= List of massacres in Mexico =

The following is a list of massacres that have taken place in the North American country of Mexico.

== Massacres ==
Name	Date	Location	Deaths	Notes
Massacre in the Great Temple of Tenochtitlan	22 May 1520	Tenochtitlan	Hundreds or Thousands	Spaniards killed Mexica nobles while they were performing a religious ceremony.
First Magdalena massacre	3 November 1757	Magdalena de Kino, Sonora	31	Seri people attack a village of Spanish inhabitants
Second Magdalena massacre	November 1776	Magdalena de Kino, Sonora	Unknown	All of Magdalena de Kino's residents died in an attack from the Seri people
Wells of Baján massacre	21 March 1811	Wells of Baján, Coahuila	40	
Goliad massacre	27 March 1836	Goliad County, Texas	342	465 prisoners. 28 escaped, 20 spared as workers, 75 spared as unarmed captives.
Dawson massacre	17 September 1842	near San Antonio de Bexar, Texas	36	15 captured and 36 killed out of a total of 54 Texan men.
Black bean episode	25 March 1843	Saltillo, Coahuila	17	Mexicans tell Texan and American diplomats that 1/10 of the prisoners they captured would die. They force Texans to choose out of a random bowl of beans, and those who chose a black bean were shot.
1846 Monterrey massacre	23 September 1846	Monterrey, Nuevo León	~60	Ampudia ordered the white flag of surrender to be flown. Many American troops, especially the Texas Rangers ran about looting and burning houses, raping women, and killing entire families of Monterrey.
1847 Monterrey massacre	4 January 1847	Monterrey, Nuevo León	~50	Texas volunteers blamed the Mexicans for the death of several of their companions in the occupied Monterrey. Consequently, American troops began shooting all civilians they encountered. The Houston Telegraph and Register, citing military sources reported over 50 killed.
Saint Patrick's Battalion massacre	10-13 September 1847	Chapultepec, Mexico City	50	50 surrendered Irish volunteers who fought as part of the Mexican Army against the United States in the Mexican–American War, collectively known as Saint Patrick's battalion, were killed by the U.S. Army.
Massacre at Janos	5 March 1851	Janos, Chihuahua	Unknown	
Crabb massacre	1-8 April 1857	Caborca, Sonora	84	84 killed out of a total of 85 American men.
Bacum Massacre	18 February 1868	Town of Bacum, Sonora	120	Mexican troops gathered over 400 Yaqui men, women, and children into a church at Bacum and then began firing upon it, leaving up to 120 civilians dead
Mazocoba massacre	18 January 1900	Guaymas, Sonora	~400	Also known as the Battle of Mazocoba
Mazatán massacre	8 June 1902	Quizuani Ranch, Sonora	127	Reprisal massacre during the Yaqui Wars. 78 men, 26 women, and 20 children died. Some of the wounded were taken to Hermosillo Municipal Hospital afterwards.
Cananea strike	1 June 1906	Cananea, Sonora	23	22 wounded
Río Blanco strike	7-8 January 1907	Río Blanco, Veracruz	50-70	Federal troops put down rioting textile workers
Torreón massacre	15 May 1911	Torreón, Coahuila	300	Chinese Mexicans were targeted
San Pedro de la Cueva massacre	2 December 1915	San Pedro de la Cueva, San Pedro de la Cueva Municipality, Sonora	91	During the Mexican Revolution, on the morning of December 2, 1915, after the disastrous campaign of his army in the state of Sonora, Pancho Villa angrily arrived in San Pedro de la Cueva and ordered the mass execution of all the residents of the town. He blamed them for the deaths of five of his men. An outpost under the command of one of her colonels, Margarito Orozco, had apprehended 300 men, women and children, training them in front of the church. When Villa ordered his officers to initiate the executions, Colonel Macario Bracamontes, who was active in his ranks, convinced him to spare the lives of a hundred women and children. Immediately, the rest of the prisoners, who numbered 112 men, were lined up against one of the walls of the Catholic church to be put under arms; at the beginning of the executions, the village priest, Andrés A. Flores Quesney, pleaded three times for the lives of the condemned, including his father, but Villa ended up killing him with a shot. The killing continued.
Santa Isabel massacre	10 January 1916	near Santa Isabel, Chihuahua	18	Villistas stopped a train near Santa Isabel, Chihuahua and killed around 17 American passengers from the ASARCO company of Tucson, Arizona.
Villa Milpa Alta massacre	15 October 1916	Milpa Alta, Mexico City	150-200	Massacre of 150 to 200 civilians, including children, perpetrated by Constitutional Army during the Mexican Revolution
1935 Revolution Day Zócalo Battle	20 November 1935	Zócalo, Mexico City	3	50 wounded, a violent conflict that broke out during the Revolution Day festival of 1935 at the Zócalo between members of the Revolutionary Mexicanist Action and multiple organizations associated with the Mexican Communist Party.
León massacre	2 January 1946	León, Guanajuato	30-100	Federal Troops called in by the Governor of the State of Guanajuato, fired into a crowd of demonstrators, killing at least 40 and up to 100 people
La Alameda massacre	7 July 1952	Mexico City	200-500	Massacre of Henriquis protesters who were protesting against fraud and irregularities in the 1952 presidential elections by the Mexican army.
San Luis Potosí massacre	15 September 1961	San Luis Potosí, San Luis Potosí	Unknown	
Chavinda massacre	August 1966	Chavinda, Michoacán	69	A 22-year-old baker named Alfonso Medina, poisoned people with arsenic in Chavinda, causing at least 69 deaths.
Atoyac massacre	18 May 1967	Atoyac de Álvarez, Guerrero	5-11	Police shot against protesters in the town of Atoyac de Álvarez. The protests were against the imposition of school uniforms and tuition fees. The massacre resulted in Lucio Cabañas creating a guerilla group that operated in the mountains of Guerrero the following years.
Cosalá massacre	December 1967	Cosalá, Sinaloa	7	A drunken Mexican soldier killed six people in Cosalá, Mexico. The soldier shot dead three other soldiers, the wife of a soldier, and two other people, before being killed himself.
San Miguel Canoa Massacre	14 September 1968	village of San Miguel Canoa, Puebla	4	A right-wing priest incited a mob of villagers to attack five mountain climbers who he believed were communists, 3 wounded
Tlatelolco massacre	2 October 1968	Mexico City	44-400	Government troops massacred between 44 (officially) and 400 (according to human rights activists, CIA documents and independent investigations) students 10 days before the 1968 Summer Olympics taking place in Mexico City, and then tried to wash the blood away, along with evidence of the massacre.
Huehuetlán el Chico massacre	15 February 1969	Huehuetlán el Chico, Puebla	18	Murder of peasants from Huehuetlán el Chico who were protesting against a mayor
Monte de Chila massacre	28 January 1970	Monte Chila, Jopala, Puebla	80 - 324	Massacre of indigenous Totonac, perpetrated by the Mexican army, it is estimated that around 324 people died in the massacre, including children, women, elderly people and men; however, there are no official figures
Corpus Christi massacre	10 June 1971	Mexico City	120	Also known as "El Halconazo", a student march was brutally attacked by a shock group called Los Halcones
Huitzotlaco Massacre	14 May 1977	Huitzotlaco, Atlapexco, Hidalgo	3	Murder of 3 peasants by gunmen hired by caciques, 12 wounded
Masacre del Penal de Oblatos	10 October 1977	Guadalajara, Jalisco	14	14 inmates murdered and seven injured.
Tzacuala massacre	21 January 1980	Tzacuala, Huautla, Hidalgo	4	4 peasants killed in Ambush in a village in Tzacauala.
Golonchán Viejo massacre	15 June 1980	Golonchán Viejo, Sitalá, Chiapas	12	Armed civilians and soldiers murdered at least 12 Tzeltal peasants. 40 wounded
Tula massacre	14 January 1982	Atotonilco de Tula, Hidalgo	13	13 tortured bodies were found at Tula, Hidalgo, Mexico at the time of Arturo Durazo Moreno Administration
Pantepec massacre	2 June 1982	Pantepec, Puebla	27	Massacre of 27 Totonac and Tepehuán indigenous peasants by municipal police, white guards and hired killers.
Centro Penitenciario Michoacán riot	20 July 1988	Michoacán	10	13 wounded
Querétaro filicide	24 April 1989	Jardines de la Hacienda colonia, Querétaro City, Querétaro	3	Claudia Mijangos, 33, stabbed her three children to death in a fit of madness, saying she heard voices ordering her to do it.
Christine nightclub shootout	8 November 1992	Puerto Vallarta, Jalisco	6-20	Members of the Sinaloa Cartel (according to some sources accompanied by elements of the state's judicial police) attacked the Disco Christine in Puerto Vallarta, leaving a balance of 6 people dead and 3 injured
Aguas Blancas massacre	28 June 1995	Aguas Blancas, Guerrero	17	Peasant protestors demanding drinking water, schools, hospitals, and roads were shot by motorized police
San Pedro Nixtalucum Massacre	14 March 1997	San Pedro Nixtalucum, El Bosque, Chiapas	4	The State Police assault civilians sympathetic to the EZLN, resulting in 4 deaths, 29 wounded, 27 detained and 300 displaced
Max Fim restaurant shooting	3 August 1997	Ciudad Juárez, Chihuahua	6	3 wounded
Acteal massacre	22 December 1997	Chenalhó, Chiapas	45	Massacre carried out by paramilitary forces of 45 people attending a prayer meeting of indigenous townspeople, who were members of the pacifist group Las Abejas ("The Bees"), in the village of Acteal, municipality of Chenalhó, in the Mexican state of Chiapas.
El Charco massacre	7 June 1998	Town of El Charco, Ayutla de los Libres, Guerrero	11	11 people were killed while sleeping in the local school, Caritino Maldonado by soldiers
El Sauzal massacre	17 September 1998	El Sauzal, Baja California	19	A command of armed men arrives at the El Rodeo farm in Ensenada, and executes three entire families. 19 people were killed and 2 were seriously wounded
El Limoncito de Alayá Massacre	14 February 2001	El Limoncito de Alayá, Cosalá, Sinaloa	12	Tijuana Cartel gunmen try to kill drug lord Javier Torres Félix and his brother Manuel at El Limoncito de Alayá, a farm in the municipality of Cosalá, Sinaloa After failing to find the two, the gunmen sought revenge by killing twelve residents of the area. 3 wounded
San Cristóbal Attack	6 May 2002	San Cristóbal, Ecatepec	2	A desperate mechanic Jose Luis Nieto Avila runs over several children and teachers at the Gabriela Mistral Daycare Center, where five-year-old Adriana Martínez and three-year-old Rodrigo Reyes lost their lives. 22 wounded
2003 shootout Nuevo Laredo	17 April - 4 May 2012	Nuevo Laredo, Tamaulipas	3	6 wounded
San Jerónimo de Juárez Massacre	31 July 2005	San Jerónimo de Juárez, Guerrero	12	2 wounded. At least 11 people were murdered in the coastal municipality of San Jerónimo de Juárez by a former military man who was apparently drugged, who was then shot and wounded. He was lynched by the villagers
2006 civil unrest in San Salvador Atenco	3-4 May 2006	San Salvador Atenco, State of Mexico	2	200-300 wounded
Río Bravo Ambush	29 November 2007	Río Bravo, Tamaulipas	6	Mexican politician Juan Antonio Guajardo and five companions were murdered in an ambush in Río Bravo
La Marquesa massacre	12 September 2008	Ocoyoacac, State of Mexico	24	24 bodies are found at a national park called La Marquesa; all bodies were shot and showed signs of torture
La Mesa prison riots	13-18 September 2008	Tijuana, Baja California	22	12 wounded
Morelia grenade attacks	15 September 2008	Morelia, Michoacán	8	132 wounded. A series of grenades are detonated in crowds gathered to celebrate Independence Day.
2009 Ciudad Juárez prison riot	4 March 2009	Cerezo state prison, Ciudad Juárez, Chihuahua	20	15 wounded
Ciudad Juárez rehab center attack	2 September 2009	El Aliviane centre, Ciudad Juárez, Chihuahua	18	3 wounded
Balderas metro station shooting	18 September 2009	Cuauhtémoc, Mexico City	2	A religious fanatic, Luiz Felipe Hernández, kills a civilian and a police officer at the Balderas station of the Metro Collective Transport System, 5 Wounded
Villas de Salvárcar massacre	31 January 2010	Ciudad Juárez, Chihuahua	15	Cartel members massacre 16 teenagers, outraging Ciudad Juarez residents.
Guerrero mass graves	June 2010	Taxco, Guerrero	55	Cartels massacre civilians
2010 Chihuahua shootings	10 June 2010	Second floor, Templo Cristiano Fe y Vida (Christian Faith and Life Temple), Chihuahua	19	4 wounded
Nuevo León mass graves	25 June 2010	Nuevo León	~70	Bodies found in mass graves across Nuevo León
Ciudad Victoria ambush	28 June 2010	Ciudad Victoria, Tamaulipas	7	The candidate of PRI Rodolfo Torre Cantú was murdered along with six of those in his entourage by agents of a drug cartel
2010 Saric shootout	1 July 2010	Sáric, Sonora	21	6 wounded
2010 Torreón Massacre	18 July 2010	Torreón, Coahuila	17-18	18 injured
1st San Fernando massacre	24 August 2010	San Fernando, Tamaulipas	72	72 undocumented migrants trying to reach the United States were killed by Los Zetas. The victims were interrogated and shot at a nearby warehouse. Initial reports suggested they were killed because of refusing to join Los Zetas as hitmen or because they were mistaken for Gulf Cartel members, but the motives are still unclear.
Tepic Massacre	27 October 2010	Tepic, Nayarit	15	An armed group that descended from trucks shot down 15 young people who worked at a car wash in the Lázaro Cárdenas neighborhood in the south of the city.
2010 Puebla oil pipeline explosion	19 December 2010	San Martín Texmelucan de Labastida, Puebla	29	52 wounded
Allende massacre	18-20 March 2011	Allende, Coahuila	42-300+	
Monterrey triple murder of journalists	25 March 2011	Monterrey, Nuevo León	3	By Los Zetas
2nd San Fernando massacre	6 April 2011	San Fernando, Tamaulipas	193	Gruesome massacre of 193 bus passengers by Los Zetas using barbaric, gladiator style tactics. A similar attack happened in the same municipality in 2010 (2010 San Fernando massacre).
Ruiz massacre	25 May 2011	Ruiz, Nayarit	29	3 wounded. One of the most violent clashes between criminal organizations in Mexico between Sinaloa Cartel and Los Zetas.
Coahuila mass graves	3 June 2011	Piedras Negras, Coahuila	38	Mass grave covered up by drug cartels
Durango massacres	April 2011	Durango, Durango	340	Various mass graves discovered between April 2011 and February 2012.
Monterrey casino attack	25 August 2011	Monterrey, Nuevo León	52	Drug cartel set a casino on fire
Altamira prison brawl	4 January 2012	Altamira, Tamaulipas	31	
Apodaca prison riot	19 February 2012	Apodaca, Nuevo León	44	
Nuevo Laredo massacres	17 April 2012	Nuevo Laredo, Tamaulipas	37	Various massacres between the Gulf Cartel and Los Zetas having a turf war
2012 Boca del Río murder of journalists	6 May 2012	Boca Del Río, Veracruz	4	
Cadereyta Jiménez massacre	13 May 2012	Cadereyta Jiménez, Nuevo León	49	Los Zetas murder Mexican civilians, either Gulf Cartel members or US-bound immigrants.
San Luis Potosí massacre	9 August 2012	San Luis Potosí, San Luis Potosí (state)	14	The Mexican police found 14 dead bodies stuffed inside a SUV on 9 August 2012 along a highway in the city of San Luis Potosí
La Pila Prison riot	27 April 2013	La Pila, San Luis Potosí	13	65 wounded
Lagos de Moreno massacre	7 July 2013	Lagos de Moreno, Jalisco	6	Kidnapping and assassination of 6 students by CJNG
Loma Blanca Massacre	22 September 2013	Loma Blanca, Ciudad Juárez, Chihuahua	10	Murder of 10 people celebrating the victory of a baseball team by gunmen
Tlatlaya massacre	30 June 2014	San Pedro Limón, Tlatlaya, Michoacán	22	22 civilians executed by government troops.
Iguala massacre	26 September 2014	Iguala, Guerrero	43	Mass kidnapping and murder of male students from Ayotzinapa Rural Teachers' College
Apatzingán massacre	5 January 2015	Apatzingán, Michoacán	16	16 unarmed civilians killed by federal police outside Apatzingán city hall.
2015 Ocotlán ambush	19 March 2015	Ocotlán, Jalisco	11	5 wounded
2015 San Sebastián del Oeste ambush	6 April 2015	San Sebastián del Oeste, Jalisco	15	A convoy of the Jalisco State Police was ambushed by suspected members of the Jalisco New Generation Cartel (CJNG) in a mountain road in San Sebastián del Oeste, Jalisco. Fifteen policemen were killed and five were wounded
1 May 2015 Jalisco attacks	1 May 2015	Jalisco	18	
Tanhuato–Ecuandureo shootout	22 May 2015	Tanhuato, Michoacán	22-42	
Colonia Narvarte murders	31 July 2015	Colonia Narvarte, Mexico City	5	Murder of photographer and journalist Rubén Espinosa along with four other women
Topo Chico prison riot	10 February 2016	Monterrey, Nuevo León	49 to 52+	Most deadly riot in Mexican penal history
2016 conflict in Nochixtlán	19 June 2016	Asunción Nochixtlán, Oaxaca	8	108 wounded
Colonia El Triunfo massacre	29 April 2018	El Triunfo, Iztapalapa, Mexico City	5	5 men are shot dead on El Triunfo street in Iztapalapa
Salamanca nightclub shooting	9 March 2019	Salamanca, Guanajuato	15	
Minatitlán shooting	19 April 2019	Minatitlán, Veracruz	14	
Uruapan massacre	8 August 2019	Uruapan, Michoacán	19	19 bodies found in three parts of the city
Coatzacoalcos nightclub fire	27 August 2019	Coatzacoalcos, Veracruz	31-32	31-32 people die in an arson attack on a bar in Coatzacoalcos, by Jalisco New Generation Cartel
2019 Western Michoacán clashes	30 August 2019	Tepalcatepec, Michoacán	9	11 wounded
2019 Auililla police massacre	14 October 2019	Aguililla, Michoacán	13	A convoy of five police trucks carrying a combined total of 42 police officers were dispatched to serve a warrant at a home in El Aguaje when over 30 drug cartel gunmen who lied in wait ambushed them with various types of firearms, killing 13 and injuring 9 of them.
LeBarón and Langford families massacre	4 November 2019	Near Bavispe, Sonora	9	Gunmen suspected of being drug cartel members ambushed three vehicles occupied by Mormon U.S.-Mexican dual citizens on a highway in Sonora, killing nine, including six children. The cars and the burned bodies of the victims were found by the police.
2019 Villa Unión shootout	30 November 2019	Villa Unión, Coahuila	28	8 wounded
Cieneguillas prison riots	31 December 2019	Near Cieneguillas, Zacatecas	17	Using weapons smuggled into the prison, the inmates rioted with 16 being killed in the first riot on 31 December and an additional inmate being killed in the second riot on January 2.
Chilapa massacre	17 January 2020	Chilapa, Guerrero	10	After passing an illegal checkpoint, a group of musicians were ambushed by Los Ardillos hitmen, killing the 10 members of the caravan. The musicians were returning from a performance in the town of Tlayelpan
Madera ambush	3 April 2020	near Chuhuichupa, Ciudad Madera, Chihuahua	19	19 people are killed in a shootout between rival cartels in Madera, Chihuahua. Local media reports the violence was part of a conflict over turf by the Juarez Cartel and the rival Sinaloa Cartel
Colima police massacre	May 2020	Colima	7	Kidnapping and murder of police
Irapuato massacres	6 June 2020 - 1 July 2020	Irapuato, Guanajuato	38	5 wounded
Camargo massacre	23 January 2021	Camargo, Tamaulipas	19	On January 23, 2021, 19 bodies were discovered near the Mexico–United States border, the victims are said to be migrants and were shot and set on fire.
Tonalá Massacre	27 February 2021	Tonala, Jalisco	11	Eleven people were killed and at least two wounded when unidentified armed assailants attacked a party.
Battle of Doctor Coss	13 March 2021	Doctor Coss, Nuevo León	10	
Coatepec Harinas attack	18 March 2021	Coatepec Harinas, State of Mexico	13	Gunmen ambushed a police convoy, killing 13 police officers.
Capture of Aguililla	6-28 April 2021	Aguililla, Michoacan	27	8 wounded
Reynosa Attacks	19 June 2021	Reynosa, Tamaulipas	19	19 people are killed, including 15 civilians.
Guerrero executions	September 2021	Guerrero	15-20	Execution of approximately 15-20 suspected members of the Guerreros Unidos, including two while being filmed, by the armed group Los Tlacos
Tarecuato massacre	11 November 2021	Tarecuato, Tangamandapio, Michoacán	11	11 gunmen killed 11 indigenous people.
Las Tinajas massacre	27 March 2022	Las Tinajas, Zinapécuaro, Michoacán	20	17 men and 3 women killed at a cockfight by members of a rival faction of Jalisco New Generation Cartel.
Celaya massacre	23 May 2022	Celaya, Guanajuato	11	A group of about 15 men shot staff and guests at a hotel.
Rayón massacre	5 August 2022	Rayón, San Luis Potosí	13	A confrontation between elements of the Civil Guard and armed men left 13 criminals dead and two arrested in Rayón, San Luis Potosí
Tuzantla shootout	24 August 2022	Tuzantla, Michoacán	8	Eight people were killed in the city of Tuzantla, Michoacán, in a firefight between rival factions of La Familia Michoacana
Yecapixtla shooting	1 September 2022	Yecapixtla, Morelos	5	Five people including a former mayor, are killed and several others are injured after a mass shooting at a soccer field in Yecapixtla, Morelos.
San Miguel Totolapan massacre	5 October 2022	San Miguel Totolapan, Guerrero	20	2 wounded
2023 Ciudad Juárez prison attack	1 January 2023	Ciudad Juárez, Chihuahua	19	Ten guards, seven inmates, and two gunmen were killed while 13 other people were wounded in an armed attack on a prison, At least 30 inmates escaped.
2023 Sinaloa unrest	5 January 2023	Sinaloa	30	The army arrests Ovidio Guzmán López, the son of incarcerated drug lord Joaquín "El Chapo" Guzmán, in Culiacán, Sinaloa. Unrest ensues in the state, with schools and airports closed. Ten soldiers, a police officer and 19 cartel members are killed. 52 Wounded
Nuevo Laredo military shooting	26 February 2023	Nuevo Laredo, Tamaulipas	5	Soldiers open fire on a pickup truck carrying unarmed civilians in Nuevo Laredo, Tamaulipas, killing five people and injuring 1, sparking protests and riots by local people
El Capire ambush	17 March 2023	El Capire, Guerrero	7	Ambush led by criminal group La Familia Michoacana
Ciudad Juárez migrant center fire	27 March 2023	Ciudad Juárez, Chihuahua	40	Central and South American detainees at a migrant center in Ciudad Juárez deliberately set fire to their mattresses, killing 40 people and injuring 27 others
Ensenada shootout	20 May 2023	Ensenada, Baja California	10	Ten people were killed and another ten wounded in an off-road vehicle rally in the San Vicente area of the city by members of the Jalisco New Generation Cartel and the Sinaloa Cartel
Beer House Cantina arson	22 July 2023	San Luis Río Colorado, Sonora	13	Customer expelled José Luis N from bar sets fire to the place and kills 13 people
Coyuca de Benítez shooting	23 October 2023	Coyuca de Benítez, Guerrero	13	13 police officers killed in ambush in Coyuca de Benitez
Salvatierra massacre	17 December 2023	Salvatierra, Guanajuato	11	11 people are killed during a mass shooting at a Christmas season party in Salvatierra, Guanajuato. Three others are killed and four injured at a bar in Tulum, Quintana Roo, while four are killed in Salamanca, Guanajuato.
2023 Ciudad Obregón shooting	29 December 2023	Ciudad Obregón, Sonora	8	Eight people are killed and 26 others are injured in a mass shooting at a party in Ciudad Obregón, Sonora. The shooting's target, a cartel member, is among those killed.
San Juan del Río massacre	9 January 2024	San Juan del Río, Querétaro	9	Nine bodies were found on a road in San Juan del Río, Querétaro
Acultzingo massacre	23 February 2024	Acultzingo, Veracruz	7	
Technological University of Guadalajara attack	6 March 2024	Guadalajara, Jalisco	3	Gabriel Alejandro Galaviz, armed with a knife and an axe, entered the Universidad Tecnológica de Guadalajara campus and attacked three employees, two women and one man. The women did not survive. Previously, he murdered another woman at a nearby motel. The aggressor was not a student at the university, his motivations were unclear, and the police believe his attack was a copycat of other school attacks such as the Colegio Cervantes shooting and Suzano massacre. Galaviz committed suicide in prison.
Chicomuselo massacre	12-13 May 2024	Chicomuselo, Chiapas.	11	Armed groups execute 11 civilians in Chicomuselo
La Concordia massacre	28 June 2024	La Concordia, Chiapas	20	Sinaloa Cartel gunmen kill 20 members of the Jalisco New Generation Cartel in Chiapas. The dead were alleged to be members of a cell operating between Chiapas and Guatemala.
2024 Querétaro massacre	9 November 2024	Santiago de Querétaro , Querétaro	10	Ten people are killed while 13 others are injured in a shooting by unidentified gunmen at a bar in Querétaro

== See also ==
- Human rights in Mexico
- List of Mexican cartels
- Missing persons in Mexico
- Timeline of the Mexican drug war
