= 2011 Monterrey casino attack =

Attack by Mexican criminal organization Los Zetas

- Part of the Mexican drug war
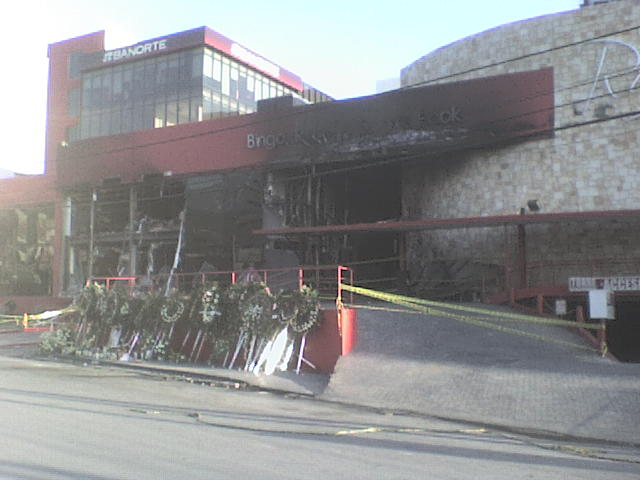
- Casino Royale after the attack
- Location: 25°40′27″N 100°21′18″W; Avenida San Jerónimo, Monterrey, Nuevo León, Mexico
- Date: August 25, 2011; 15:30 – (UTC-5)
- Target: Casino Royale owner
- Attack type: Fire attack using fuel and grenades
- Deaths: 52
- Injuries: 10
- Perpetrator: Los Zetas

On August 25, 2011, members of the drug cartel Los Zetas set a casino on fire in Monterrey, Nuevo León, Mexico, killing 52 people.

The arson attack left over a dozen injured, and over 35 trapped for several hours. Mexican forces, which arrived minutes after the incident, eventually used backhoes to break down the walls and free the trapped victims. Media reports state the majority of those killed were women, including one who was pregnant. Although the government crackdown on the drug cartels dates back to 2006, Monterrey became an increasingly violent city in 2010, due to the rupture between the Gulf Cartel and Los Zetas.

Surveillance footage shows vehicles with gunmen arriving at the entrance of Casino Royale. After the gunmen descended from their vehicles, they stormed the casino's main entrance, opened fire on guests, and doused the casino entrances with gasoline, starting a fire that trapped people inside. The attack was classified as the most violent and bloodiest in the history of Monterrey and one of the worst in the state of Nuevo León.

== Background ==
Grupo Royale is a chain of casinos and entertainment venues with branches in Monterrey, Mazatlán and Los Cabos, as well as a branch in Escobedo named "Fantastic Escobedo".

The casino Royale San Jerónimo is at the junction of Calle Jesús María González and Avenida San Jerónimo, and is owned by the same owners of Conexiones y Mangueras S.A. (Cymsa) and Entertainment Enterprises of México S.A. de C.V. It was opened in November 2007 to more than 500 people, to whom the casino gave a total of two million pesos (approx. 183,000 USD in 2007) as a welcoming gift.

The casino had been attacked on several previous occasions. On January 17, 2011, it was announced in the news media that the business had been the victim of organized crime, and that an armed squad had entered the premises to subdue those inside, although this was denied by their then legal representative, Enrique Hernández Navarro. In the early hours of May 25 of the same year, it was attacked by a group of delinquents who detonated firearms, taking money from customers and from the establishment, which was one of several casinos attacked that day.

On May 4, 2011, the casino had been shut down by the municipality for failure to obtain permits for expanding the premises. It reopened its doors on May 31 after an appeal by its owners to the State Tribunal for Administrative Litigation, claiming that the works were for remodeling. This appeal was granted by magistrate José Alfonso Solís Navarro.

Before the attack, another betting center owned by Grupo Royale had been attacked twice during the year by organized crime, but with no casualties.

== Attack ==
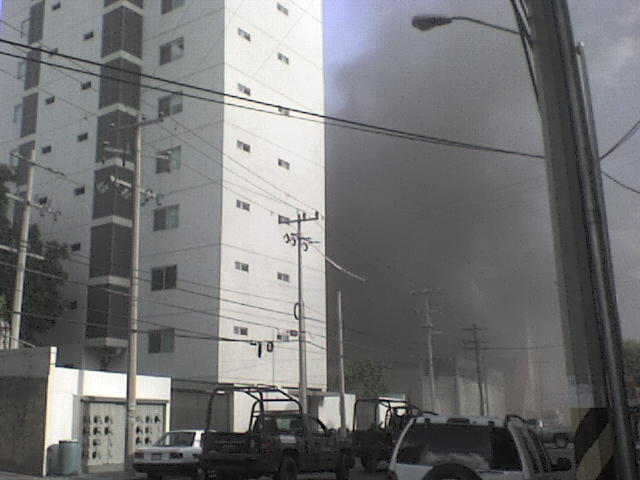
Smoke rises during the fire

Minutes before 2 pm on August 25, 2011, in Monterrey, Nuevo León, 12 members of the criminal group Los Zetas, along with one of its leaders, met at El Gran Pastor restaurant located on Gonzalitos Avenue, just a few blocks away from the casino. The cartel members ate cabrito in a "special meeting", where they were given orders to carry out the attack at the Casino Royale.

According to the perpetrators, the attack was intended to send a message to the owner of the casino for failing to pay extortion money. By 3 pm the Zetas left the restaurant and headed to a Pemex station in the Valle Verde neighborhood to fill barrels of gasoline. Two separate surveillance videos supplied by the governor confirmed this and showed the two pickups driving away down Gonzalitos Avenue. While driving down the avenue, the second video captured the moment when the convoy turned toward the casino.

The perpetrators arrived there at approximately 3:50 pm in a convoy of four vehicles: a Mini Cooper, a Chevrolet Equinox, a blue GMC and a grey VW Beetle. In the first minute and a half, several armed men, about eight or nine, stormed the casino while some people inside managed to escape. The criminals then ordered the people inside to hurry out, but many of them were scared and decided to hide. Witnesses claim that one of the gunmen struck the receptionist with his assault rifle before the other triggermen spread the gasoline inside the premises.

The crowd of 150 croupiers and customers, mostly women, stampeded inside the casino from the game area to the bathrooms, stairways, and blocked emergency exits. Some of them reportedly heard gunfire and explosions that they thought were grenade detonations. While some people managed to leave through the main entrance, after a few minutes this became impossible due to the spreading fire; several people were hurt in the stampede as panic descended on the scene. All 52 victims died of suffocation from carbon monoxide poisoning after hiding in bathrooms and offices. It was later confirmed that the emergency exits in the casino were locked.

In only three minutes, the perpetrators had started the fire and fled the scene, only to be captured on surveillance video. When the emergency crews tore down the walls of the smoldering casino, they found corpses littered in huge piles inside the bathrooms, the stairwells, and under game tables. By the next morning, the Mexican authorities confirmed that 52 people had died, while dozens more had been admitted to the hospital.

== Reactions ==
The company Atracciones y Emociones Vallarta S.A. de C.V., whose Administration Council consists of Rodrigo Madero Covarrubias, José Francisco Madero Dávila, and Ramón Agustín Madero Dávila, denied any relationship with the Casino Royale, as they had previously divested from it.

City mayor Fernando Larrazábal Bretón and Juana María Treviño Torres, president of the Tribunal for Administrative Litigation, blamed each other for the tragedy: Larrazábal blamed the tribunal for permitting the casino to reopen, while Treviño Torres blamed Monterrey Civil Protection for not ensuring that it had accessible emergency exits. On August 27, magistrate José Alfonso Solís Navarro (who authorized the reopening) resigned his position.

A contingent of 3,000 soldiers and federal police was sent to the city, and the rest of the state was patrolled by armored units and Black Hawk helicopters to maintain security. Furthermore, the ex-mayor of Monterrey, Adalberto Madero, was detained by the Attorney General and federal forces for a supposed link to the administrative council of the company believed to manage the Casino Royale.

President Felipe Calderón declared three days of national mourning. Twenty-six relatives of the victims demanded compensation for their loss and for the hospital and funeral expenses, although the company (through its lawyer Juan Gómez Jaime) denied any responsibility due to the tragedy being out of the company's control. However, the government offered to pay funeral and legal expenses as well as educational grants, medical and psychological bills.

On November 7, two casinos belonging to the company were closed: the Montecarlo in Mazatlán, Sinaloa and the Play Win Casino in Los Cabos, Baja California Sur; however, the company Entretenimiento de México has confirmed that it is no longer a member.

A few days after the attack, the narrative song "El Muerto 53" appeared anonymously in order to "reach the voice of the people".

== Suspects ==
The attack was attributed to organized crime, with the two initially suspected groups being the Gulf Cartel and Los Zetas, who both claimed control of the area. It was later confirmed to be the latter group. With the help of witness statements, portraits of the attackers were drawn. On August 26, three stolen cars were discovered and found to be those that had been caught on camera during the attack. The Attorney General offered 30 million pesos for information leading to the capture of the suspects.

On August 29, the governor of Nuevo León, Rodrigo Medina de la Cruz, reported that the first five individuals suspected of starting the casino fire had been arrested. The five of them confessed to having participated in the crime which led to 52 deaths, but stated that they had not intended to kill anyone, but had rather wanted to scare the owners of the building because they had refused to pay a weekly fee of 130,000 pesos (roughly US$10,000 to $11,000, Aug 2011) to be allowed to operate. Though they had decided to attack, the situation grew out of their control. More gang members were later arrested.

=== Fugitives ===
On September 14, the Sub-Prosecutor for Regional Control of the Attorney General of Mexico, José Cuitláhuac Salinas Martínez, published a list of 18 people involved in the attack, including the identity and photographs of four Los Zetas leaders. Three of them were later captured, and the last one was shot dead on April 4, 2012.

The remainder have only been identified by nicknames and sketch portraits:

- El Monterrey
- La Kitty or La Pelirroja ("The Redhead")
- La Beba
- El Chimpas and/or Chimpa and/or Chilpa
- El Huevo ("The Egg")
- El Tony

=== Captured ===
Name	Alias	Age	Date of capture	Notes
Luis Carlos Carrazco Espinoza	Chihuas	25	August 29	Moved to Topo Chico prison
Javier Alonso Martínez Morales	Javo	37	August 29	Moved to Topo Chico prison
Jonathan Jahir Reyna Gutiérrez		18	August 29	Moved to Topo Chico prison
Juan Ángel Leal Flores	El Casillas or Cash	20	August 29	Moved to Topo Chico prison
Julio Tadeo Berrones Ramírez	Julio Rayas	28	August 29	Moved to Topo Chico prison
Luis Adán Gómez Vázquez	El Gordo	33	September 18	
Jonathan Estrada Pérez	La Tita	20	September 18	Moved to Topo Chico prison
Tomás Barbosa Sánchez	Tommy	21	September 18	Moved to Topo Chico prison
José Alfredo Grimaldo Rodríguez	El Tejón	19	September 18	Lookout; Moved to Topo Chico prison
Alan Enrique	El Pikachú	15 or 16	September 18	Lookout; Released on September 27; Arrested again October 26
Roberto Carlos López Castro	El Toruño		September 29	
José Alberto Loera Rodríguez	El Voltaje	28	October 5	
Carlos Oliva Castillo	La Rana	37	October 14	Planned the attack Presumably the third-in-command of Los Zetas, just behind Heriberto Lazcano alias "el Lazca," and Miguel Treviño Morales, alias "Z-40."
Antonio Camacho Jaco	El Bogar	24	October 21	Head of Los Zetas in northern Monterrey; Moved to Topo Chico prison
Gerardo Alejandro de León Jiménez	El Papas		October 21	Moved to Topo Chico prison
Américo Orlando Soto Reyes	El Bam Bam or El Junior	23	October 26	Lookout
Saúl Becerra Reyes	El Pelón or El Chueco	21	October 26	Lookout
Jesús Rafael Torres Bautista	El Colitas	18	November 4	Participated directly, using firearms. Committed suicide in his cell in July 2022.
José Mejía Garza	El Flaco or El Negro	24	November 4	From Monclova, Coahuila
Jesús	Chuy Pestañas	16	November 4	
Itzama	Chama	16	November 4	
Yesenia		17	November 4	
Yaresi	Ale	15	November 4	
Hugo Iván Santos Doria	El Monky or Manitas		November 9	Informant
Baltazar Saucedo Estrada	El Mataperros ("The Dog Killer")		January 5	Planned and took part in the attack Second in command of the organisation

=== Sentenced ===
Victims
1. María Hilda González González
2. Miriam González González
3. María Inés González González
4. Rómulo Baldomero Tamez Salazar
5. María de los Ángeles Pérez Patlán
6. Flor María González Gómez
7. María del Carmen Martínez Grimaldo
8. Laura Adriana Gregoria Navarrete Berlanga
9. Martín Jesús Saide Azar
10. Idalia Elizabeth Walls Polendo
11. María Martha Navarro Moreno
12. María Esperanza Alanís Chapa
13. Isabel Ladrón de Guevara Barrada
14. Lilia Elma Vela Vázquez
15. Lorena Villarreal Elizondo
16. Rosa Mariana Ramírez Díaz
17. Aída Cavazos de la Peña
18. María Guadalupe Monsiváis Estrada
19. Yolanda Rocha Delgado
20. Adelina Hernández Huerta
21. Mayra Liliana González Zamarripa
22. Joaquín Martínez Ríos
23. Nora Elia Ortegón de Lomelí
24. Edith Castillo Ramírez
25. Rubén Noé Morales Castillo
26. Christian Alejandro Solís Huerta
27. Sara Aurora Ramírez Rodríguez
28. Juan Manuel Juárez Alonso
29. Carmen Adriana Flores Navarro
30. Julia Yuridia Cardona Morales
31. María Elena Moreno Luna
32. María Dolores Campos Rodríguez
33. Martha Elena Gutiérrez Salinas
34. Juana Saldaña García
35. Petra Bustos Velásquez
36. Lucía del Carmen Anguiano Lugo
37. Benito Garza Garza
38. Eduardo Enrique Martínez Cavazos
39. Karla María Espinosa Vega
40. Irma Sofía Vélez Álvarez
41. Azucena Rocío Dávila de la Garza
42. Brad Xavier Muraira Pérez
43. Priscila Barbosa Zapata
44. Miguel Ángel Loera Castro
45. Amalia Terrazas Moreno
46. Elsa Martínez Pérez
47. Jeny Adriana García Toledano
48. Jeny Adriana Toledano Flores
49. Sonia de la Peña Guerrero
50. Flora Montes Padilla
51. Josefina Contreras Orozco
52. Laura Elena Rodríguez de la Garza

All of the arrested were detained until their sentencing. On September 27, the minor Alan Enrique was released from the Juvenile Centre as no evidence was found that he was responsible for any part of the attack, despite having been named as a participant by some of the other arrested individuals, although he was later re-arrested.

On October 27, restriction orders were closed on ten of the fourteen who had then been arrested. The Attorney General of Nuevo León ordered their arrests for homicide and organised criminal activity, having them moved to Topo Chico prison accompanied by a strong security team.

== Victims ==
The majority of the victims were adults, people over the age of fifty and casino employees. Of the 52 people who died during the attack, 10 were men and 42 women, including two pregnant women, one of whom was in her seventh month. 45 of the dead were identified (35 women and 10 men) and the rest had to be tested in order to determine their identity as they had suffered severe burns. All of them died from toxic fumes, although only 7 of the corpses were burned. Most of them were from Monterrey, but two were from Tamaulipas. Of the 10 injured people, 3 were hospitalized in stable condition.

The victims included Joaquín Martínez, uncle of Silvia Landeros, a well-known television presenter at Multimedios Television, as well as the sister-in-law of ex-footballer Alfredo «Alacrán» Jiménez, whose condition has not been reported.

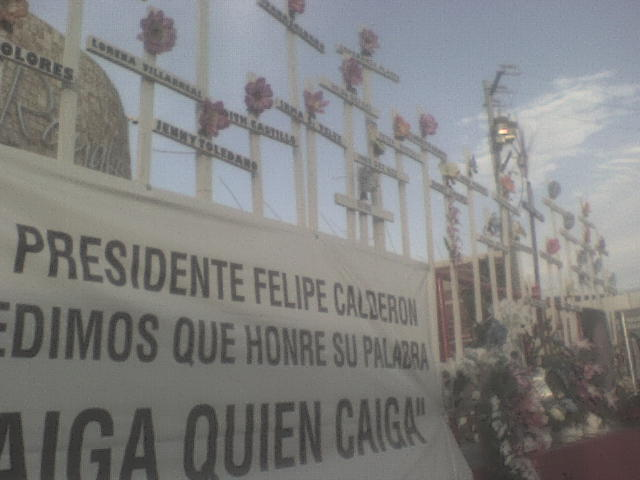
Memorial two months after the attack

=== Altar ===
Two months after the attack, family members of the 52 victims came to the scene of the accident to create a memorial with 53 white wooden crosses with the names of the victims, plus one with the word "baby" for the unborn child, as well as leaving a banner asking the president not to forget about the case, referring to the specialist reports allowing the federation to take charge:

"Sr. Presidente Felipe Calderón
le pedimos que honre su palabra
"CAIGA QUIEN CAIGA"
confiamos en usted"

"Mr. President Felipe Calderón
we ask you to keep your word
"whoever falls"
we trust in you"

Around 50 of the victims' family members joined hands, prayed for the victims, and asked for justice. Members of the public also left arrangements of flowers on the pavement outside the casino. And as of 2012, the families have asked the authorities to preserve the casino and keep it intact.

== Discrepancies ==
Academics and intellectuals disagree strongly about whether or not the Monterrey casino attack was a "terrorist act", a term used by the President of the Republic during a press conference denouncing the killings. Academics define it as a "reprehensible criminal act" and not as an act of terrorism; terrorism has different characteristics, involving ideology and doctrine, such as in the case of ETA or the 2011 attacks in Norway. The criminal acts of drug trafficking and organized crime are not strictly defined in Mexican law, and are usually a form of score-settling between criminal groups, unlike in Colombia, where acts of narcoterrorism against the public have a legal definition.

== Reactions ==
=== National ===
- The president of Mexico, Felipe Calderón, called the attacks an act of terrorism and organized crime, and declared three days of national mourning.

==== Cancelled events ====
- Juan Manuel González, president of the seventh International Festival of Cinema in Monterrey, cancelled the red carpet showing of the film Viento en contra, produced by and starring Bárbara Mori.
- The running of the bulls in the plaza Monumental Monterrey Lorenzo Garza which was celebrating its 74th year, as well as the tribute to ex-bullfighter Eloy Cavazos.

=== International ===
- United States' president Barack Obama called the attack "brutal" and "reprehensible".
- German chancellor Angela Merkel sent her condolences via press conference.
- France condemned the acts as "barbarism which has brutally shaken Mexican society", through its spokesman Bernard Valero.
- President of Costa Rica Laura Chinchilla called it a "cowardly terrorist act".
- President of Panama Ricardo Martinelli invited Latin America to build a "united front" to combat organized crime.

==== Organizations ====
- Secretary-general of the United Nations Ban Ki-moon called it a "deplorable act of violence".
- Amnesty International demanded a detailed investigation of the facts, and declared their solidarity with the victims' families and the inhabitants of the region.

== See also ==
- 2011–12 in the Mexican drug war
- 2010 San Fernando massacre
- 2011 San Fernando massacre
- 2011 Durango massacres
- Apodaca prison riot
- Altamira prison brawl
- Coahuila mass graves
- Nuevo León mass graves
- Resorts World Manila attack, a similar fire attack in a casino in Manila, Philippines
