= Tamaulipas massacre =

Tamaulipas massacre may refer to

- 2010 Tamaulipas massacre, the mass murder of 72 illegal immigrants, on August 24, 2010
- 2011 Tamaulipas massacre, the mass murder of at least 177 people discovered in mass graves on April 6, 2011
