= Marcela Turati =

Mexican journalist, author

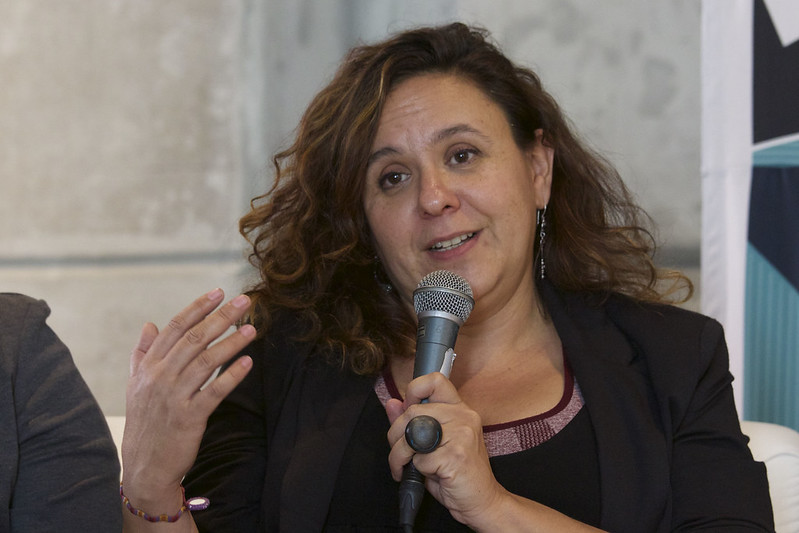
- Marcela Turati speaking at a journalism conference in 2017
- Born: Marcela Turati; March 26, 1974 (age 52); Mexico City, Mexico.
- Education: Universidad Iberoamericana
- Occupations: Journalist; author

Marcela Turati (born March 26, 1974) is a Mexican journalist, author, and activist. Her work covers drug violence, forced disappearances, and human rights.

== Journalism career ==
Turati holds a degree in journalism from Universidad Iberoamericana. She started her career with a focus on poverty. Turati is known as one of the leading Mexican journalists to cover forced disappearances. She currently writes for Proceso and has written for various news media outside of Mexico including The New York Times and The Washington Post.

== Published works ==
=== Fuego Cruzado (2011) ===
Published in 2011, Fuego Cruzado tells the stories of victims of Mexico's war on drugs.

=== San Fernando: Última Parada (2023) ===
In San Fernando: Última Parada, Turati writes about her 12-year-long investigation of cartel violence and state corruption in San Fernando, Tamaulipas. The city was the site of two infamous massacres: 72 migrants killed in 2010 and 193 people killed in 2011. In the book, Turati presents a communal narrative through the perspectives of survivors, family members of victims, community members, government workers, nonprofit leaders, and other people affected by the violence. The structure of the book consists of eleven chapters spread over two parts. The chapters are further subdivided into sections that focus on different perspectives, events, and themes. The book has an experimental form, with the text predominantly composed of quotes from people Turati interviewed. It also contains transcripts of official reports, government documents, and forensic files, supplemented by Turati's analysis.

In the prologue, Turati introduces the context of drug violence and corruption in Mexico and describes the investigative process she undertook to write the book. She also reflects on the emotional impact of investigating such devastating violence and impunity, beginning the book with the statement "My soul abandoned me in Matamoros."

Part I traces the San Fernando massacres from the disappearances of bus passengers (mostly migrants traveling north) to the discovery of mass graves throughout San Fernando and its outskirts. Through interview excerpts from survivors and their families, as well as bus drivers, government officials, and alleged perpetrators, Turati presents a chilling and complex narrative of cartel violence and its effects on San Fernando and beyond.

Part II begins by detailing the Mexican government's failure to identify victims and return their bodies to their families. It then describes the efforts of several women-led organizations in Central America and Mexico to help victims' families find disappeared loved ones and fight for justice, an effort that is ongoing.

In the epilogue, Turati recounts how she was investigated and surveilled by the Mexican government for her work reporting on the massacres and the government's response to the violence.

=== Other works ===
Turati is a coauthor of Migraciones vemos… infancias no sabemos (2008), La Guerra por Juárez (2009), and Entre las cenizas: Historias de vida en tiempos de muerte (2013).

== Activism ==
Turati is a cofounder of Periodistas de a Pie, an organization of women journalists that aims to protect freedom of the press and equip journalists to cover human rights and related issues. She is also a cofounder of Quinto Elemento Lab, a collaboration of journalists that seeks to elevate stories that serve the public interest.

In 2018, Turati, along with Alejandra Guillén and Mago Torres, published an investigation titled "The Country of Two Thousand Graves." The project brought together over 90 journalists to investigate forced disappearances in Mexico from 2006 to 2016. The investigation found over 2,000 graves.

Due to her investigative reporting and activism, Turati was the subject of surveillance from the Mexican government.

== Awards and recognition ==
In 2007, Turati won the "Latin America and the Millennium Development Goals" prize from the United Nations Development Program and the Inter Press Service for her coverage of child labor. Turati was awarded the 2011 Walter Reuter German Journalism prize for an article about families of disappeared people in Mexico. In 2013, she won the Louis M. Lyons Award for Conscience and Integrity in Journalism and the WOLA Human Rights Award for her coverage of the Mexican drug war. Turati is a two-time finalist for the Gabriel Garcia Marquez International Award. Turati won the 2014 Recognition for Excellence award from the Gabriel Garcia Marquez Foundation for a New Ibero-American Journalism. In 2017, Turati was a Knight Latin American Nieman Fellow at the Nieman Foundation for Journalism. In 2018, she won the Fleischaker/Greene Award for Courageous International Reporting. Turati was awarded the Maria Moors Cabot Prize in 2019.
