= San Fernando massacre =

The San Fernando massacre may refer to:

- The 1868 San Fernando massacre, in Paraguay on 21 December 1868, on the eve of the Battle of Lomas Valentinas
- The 2010 San Fernando massacre, at the village of El Huizachal, San Fernando, Tamaulipas, Mexico, where 72 murdered people were found on 24 August 2010
- The 2011 San Fernando massacre, at the ranch of La Joya, San Fernando, Tamaulipas, Mexico, where 193 people were murdered between 24 and 29 March 2011
