= Antimonumento +72 =

Anti-monument in Mexico City

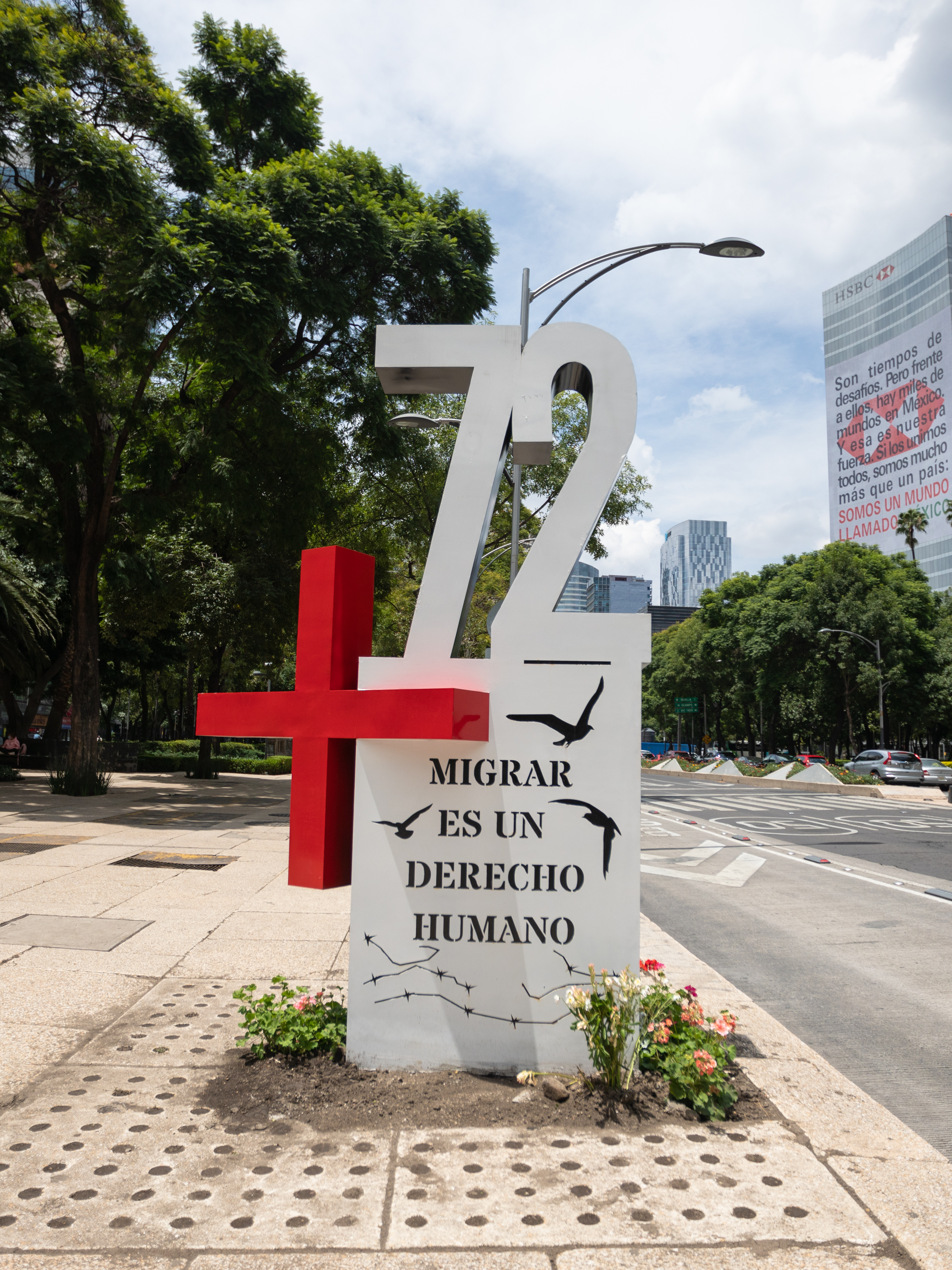
- The anti-monument in 2020
- Location
- Location: Paseo de la Reforma, Mexico City, Mexico
- Coordinates: 19°25′39.0″N 99°9′58.5″W
- Designer: Anonymous demonstrators
- Type: Anti-monument
- Material: Steel
- Height: 3 m (9.8 ft)
- Weight: Almost 500 kg (1,100 lb)
- Opening date: 22 August 2020
- Dedicated to: The victims of the 2010 San Fernando massacre, and disappeared and murdered migrants

Antimonumento +72 (Mexican Spanish pronunciation: [ˌan.ti.mo.nuˈmen.to ˈmas seˌtenta i ˈdos]) is an anti-monument located on the sidewalk opposite the (then) Embassy of the United States in Mexico City, on Paseo de la Reforma in the borough of Cuauhtémoc. The steel work comprises a white number 72 and a red plus symbol, placed on a white pedestal with images of doves and the phrases "Migration is a human right" and "No one is illegal in the world" in Spanish. The sculpture was dedicated to the seventy-two migrants murdered in 2010 in the village of El Huizachal, in the municipality of San Fernando, Tamaulipas, after being detained by the drug cartel Los Zetas. The artwork was never given an official name; its installers referred to it simply as Antimonumento. The plus symbol also carries the meaning of honoring migrants who disappeared or were murdered during their crossing.

The anti-monument was installed by protesters at noon on 22 August 2020 – the tenth anniversary of the San Fernando massacre – as a plea for justice for the massacre and other crimes involving migrants, and to prevent the case from being forgotten by the authorities and society. The installers spoke out against the harsh laws related to the Mexico–United States border crisis preventing free transit across the international border, even before the first presidency of Donald Trump (2017–2021) and his proposed expansion of the wall. At the same time, they criticized the difficulties of crossing Mexico in relation to the crimes and harassment that migrants receive, including by co-nationals.

== Background ==
On 22 August 2010, an armed commando from the Los Zetas criminal organization stopped a busload of migrants headed to the United States in Tamaulipas. The Los Zetas questioned their motives and extended an invitation to join the group. When the migrants refused, they were transported to an empty ranch in the village of El Huizachal, in the San Fernando Municipality. Los Zetas shot the migrants in the head after commanding them to kneel against a wall. Seventy-two migrants (fifty-eight men and fourteen women) were killed, while three of them survived. An Ecuadorian migrant pretended to be fatally injured, and when he heard the drug cartel leave, he stepped outside to ask for assistance. He found members of the navy, whom he then led to the execution site.

== History ==
=== Installation and description ===
Part of the statement by the installers
"For the 72 migrants massacred in San Fernando, Tamaulipas, in August 2010. For 58 men and 14 women who were executed and their remains abandoned in the open. But not only for them; the sculpture carries a + sign because there are thousands, perhaps hundreds of thousands of disappeared and murdered on their way through Mexico [...] Paradoxical but real: in Mexico, a country with generations of migrants, a place where we all have a relative on the other side, we are not able to understand and embrace those who also migrate. Even when they are also Mexicans".

On 22 August 2020, at 10:00 in the morning, various groups of activists, relatives of disappeared people, migrants, and non-governmental organizations gathered in front of the (then) Embassy of the United States in Mexico City building to commemorate the tenth anniversary of the massacre. An hour later, a truck with a steel sculpture parked next to the sidewalk on the opposite side of the embassy. At the site, they removed a tree and replanted it 5 meters (16 ft) away. Then, they cemented the sculpture. Following its installation, a mass was held where the families were supported to continue fighting for justice.

The site was selected because the installers claimed that because of American economic and geographic domination over other countries, those countries' residents have been compelled to emigrate, resulting in systemic violence against migrants. The inspiration to place the anti-monument came a year prior when relatives of the victims traveled from their respective countries to Mexico City to protest in front of the National Palace, the official residence of the president of Mexico.

The steel sculpture consists of a white number 72 made of metal along with a red plus symbol, placed on a white pedestal with images of doves and the phrases "Migration is a human right" and "No one is illegal in the world" in Spanish. It is 3 meters (9.8 ft) high and weighs nearly 500 kilograms (1,100 lb).

=== Events after its installation ===
Protesters gather at the anti-monument during International Migrants Day, on 18 December. After the Ciudad Juárez migrant center fire, where 40 migrants died in a fire on 27 March 2023, migrants and members of pro-migrant organizations placed a memorial at the anti-monument. They also criticized that the director of the National Institute of Migration, Francisco Garduño Yáñez, remained in charge of the institute despite a formal indictment from the Attorney General of Mexico.
