= Guerrero mass graves =

Mass grave found in Mexico in 2010

The Guerrero mass graves was a multihomicide of more than 55 people found in June 2010 in Taxco, Guerrero, Mexico. Officials of the state of Guerrero speculate that the mass graves where the bodies were found may hold up to 100 corpses.

The mass murder was reportedly carried out by members of the Mexican drug cartels that operate in the state.

== See also ==
- List of massacres in Mexico
- Mexican drug war
- 2011 San Fernando massacre
- 2011 Durango massacres
- Coahuila mass graves
