= Camargo massacre =

2021 drug-related massacre in Mexico

- Location: Santa Anita, Camargo Municipality, Tamaulipas, Mexico
- Date: 22 January 2021
- Attack type: Mass Murder
- Deaths: 19
- Victims: Civilians and smugglers
- Perpetrators: Grupo de Operaciones Especiales (GOPES), Tamaulipas State Guard

The Camargo massacre occurred on 22 January 2021, in the Santa Anita locality of Camargo Municipality, Tamaulipas, Mexico. Nineteen people—including 16 Guatemalan migrants, 2 Mexican nationals, and 1 Salvadoran national acting as smugglers—were shot and their remains incinerated inside a vehicle. In September 2023, 11 members of the elite Special Operations Group (GOPES) were sentenced to 50 years in prison for the killings, while a 12th officer received a 19-year sentence for his cooperation with the prosecution.

== Background ==
Camargo is situated in the “Little Border” or “Frontera Chica” region, a strategic corridor used for the illicit transit of narcotics and migrants into Texas. The territory is a site of long-standing conflict between the Gulf Cartel and the Cártel del Noreste, a splinter group of the former Los Zetas organization. Historically, this rivalry has made the region a center for extreme violence.

The Special Operations Group (GOPES) was a 150-member elite tactical unit of the Tamaulipas State Guard. Formerly known as CAIET, the unit had a long-standing reputation for human rights abuses, including forced disappearances. Following the Camargo investigation and trial, the unit was officially disbanded.

== Massacre ==
On 12 January 2021, a group of approximately 30 migrants departed from Comitancillo and San Marcos, Guatemala. By 22 January, the group was traveling through Tamaulipas in three vehicles. Following an anonymous tip, authorities discovered two charred vehicles on a dirt road in Santa Anita. Inside a Chevrolet Silverado, investigators found 19 bodies. A Toyota Sequoia was also found abandoned at the scene.

Forensic analysis revealed that the Silverado had sustained 113 bullet impacts. Although the gunfire was extensive, no shell casings were found at the site; investigators later determined that the officers had collected the brass casings to conceal their presence.

== Victims ==
The victims were mostly indigenous Mam migrants from rural villages in Guatemala.

Victims
Name	Nationality	Origin	Role
Élfegio Roliberto Miranda Díaz	Guatemalan	San Francisco, Comitancillo	Migrant
Marvin Alberto Tomás López	Guatemalan	Las Flores, Comitancillo	Migrant
Adán Coronado Marroquín	Guatemalan	Comitancillo	Migrant
Edgar López y López	Guatemalan	Chicajalaj, Comitancillo	Migrant
Osmar Neftalí Miranda Baltazar	Guatemalan	Chicajalaj, Comitancillo	Migrant
Rivaldo Danilo Jiménez Ramírez	Guatemalan	Tuilelén, Comitancillo	Migrant
Anderson Marco Antulio Pablo	Guatemalan	Nueva Esperanza, Comitancillo	Migrant
Iván Gudiel Pablo Tomás	Guatemalan	Peña Flor, Comitancillo	Migrant
Santa Cristina García Pérez	Guatemalan	Peña Flor, Comitancillo	Migrant
Uber Feliciano Vásquez	Guatemalan	El Porvenir, Comitancillo	Migrant
Rubelsy Elías Tomás Isidro	Guatemalan	El Duraznal, Comitancillo	Migrant
Dora Amelia López Rafael	Guatemalan	La Estancia, Sipacapa	Migrant
Brandon David García Ramírez	Guatemalan	Granados, Baja Verapaz	Migrant
Leyda Siomara Gonzáles Vásquez	Guatemalan	Concepción Tutuapa, San Marcos	Migrant
Madelyn Estéfanie García Ramírez	Guatemalan	Granados, Baja Verapaz	Migrant
Paola Damaris Zacarías Gabriel	Guatemalan	Catarina, San Marcos	Migrant
Jesús Martínez Guerrero	Mexican		Smuggler
Daniel Pérez Quirós	Mexican		Smuggler
Unidentified	Salvadoran		Smuggler

== Legal proceeding ==
=== Evidence and trial ===
The prosecution’s case was built on a massive synthesis of evidence, involving the testimony of 80 witnesses, including forensic experts, local residents, and other migrants who had been part of the larger convoy but were not present in the two vehicles targeted. These accounts refuting the official police narrative, which falsely asserted that officers had merely discovered the vehicles already incinerated following a shootout between rival cartels.

The survivors testified that GOPES units intercepted the convoy and opened fire without provocation. This evidence, corroborated by the testimony of cooperating officer Ismael Vázquez, allowed the court to determine that the defendants had not only executed the victims but had also systematically altered the crime scene. This tampering included the purposeful collection of shell casings and the incineration of the remains to conceal the officers' involvement in the massacre.

=== Sentencing ===
In September 2023, a judge found 11 officers guilty sentencing each to 50 years in prison. Vázquez was sentenced to 19 years for his cooperation. The court also mandated reparations of approximately 3.8 million pesos to be paid to each victim's family.

== Reaction ==
In Guatemala, President Alejandro Giammattei declared three days of national mourning for the victims.

The United States government confirmed that three of the convicted officers had received tactical training through U.S. State Department programs in 2016 and 2017. While the U.S. Embassy stated the training was compliant with the Leahy Law at the time.

== See also ==
- 2010 San Fernando Massacre
- 2011 San Fernando Massacre
- Cadereyta Jiménez massacre
