= Villa Unión (disambiguation) =

Villa Unión may refer to:

- Villa Unión (Argentina)
- Villa Unión, Coahuila (Mexico)
- Villa Unión, Sinaloa (Mexico)
