= Anzaldua =

Anzaldua or Anzaldúa is a surname. Notable people with the surname include:

- Gloria E. Anzaldúa (1942–2004), American scholar of feminism
- Juan Antonio Guajardo Anzaldúa (1958–2007), Mexican politician
- Leraldo Anzaldua (born 1975), American voice actor
