= Claudia Mijangos =

Mexican murder ex-convict (born 1956)

Claudia Mijangos Arzac
- Born: May 26, 1956 (age 70); Mazatlán, Mexico
- Other name: "La hiena de Querétaro" (The Hyena of Querétaro)
- Occupations: Catechism teacher and ex-beauty queen
- Known for: Committing filicide against her three children
- Spouse: Alfredo Castaños Gutiérrez (?-) (divorced)
- Children: Claudia María Castaños Mijangos; Ana Belén Castaños Mijangos; Alfredo Antonio Castaños Mijangos
- Parent(s): Antonio Mijangos (father); María del Carmen Arzac (mother)
- Status: Released to mental facility, 2019
- Motive: Serious mental disorders
- Criminal charges: 3 counts of murder
- Penalty: 30-years in prison
- Capture status: Free

Details
- Victims: Her 3 children
- Date: 24 April 1989
- Country: Mexico
- State: Querétaro
- Date apprehended: 1989

Claudia Mijangos Arzac (born 25 May 1956) is a Mexican woman who was convicted of filicide. In April 1989, Mijangos stabbed her three children to death declaring she was obliged by a diabolical entity that possessed her. She was diagnosed with schizoaffective disorder and temporal lobe epilepsy. Therefore, she was sentenced to 30 years in prison, the maximum sentence for such a crime in Mexico. Mijangos was released from prison in 2019 and admitted to a psychiatric clinic.

According to local legends, the house where she committed the crime (in the Jardines de la Hacienda colonia of Querétaro) is haunted. The site was explored by the Mexican paranormal television program, Extranormal and by the Mexican parapsychologist Carlos Trejo.

== Background ==
Claudia Mijangos was born on 25 May 1956 in Sinaloa, Mexico, where she was raised in an upper-middle-class family. In her youth, she was named beauty queen of her hometown of Mazatlán. After graduating in commerce, she married Alfredo Castaños Gutiérrez. They had three children. After the death of her parents, the family inherited a sizable amount of money and moved to Querétaro City, Querétaro. There, the three children were enrolled in the Catholic school Colegio Fray Luis de León, where Claudia Mijangos worked as a catechism teacher. Claudia later opened a clothing store downtown.

In the late 1980s, Claudia and her husband Alfredo began to develop marital problems. She began to display signs of emotional instability, according to relatives and friends. The couple attended marriage counseling with Dr. Jaime Flores. Claudia and Alfredo separated in 1989.

== Murders ==
When Claudia was 33 years old, she began to experience severe psychotic attacks in the months preceding the murders. These attacks reportedly involved hallucinations of demons and angels which left Claudia psychologically tormented.

On 23 April 1989, Claudia's husband picked up their children from a school fair and brought them to Claudia's house. There, Castaños and Claudia engaged in an intense argument. He probed her about Father Ramon and articulated his desire to get back together. Furious, Claudia defended Father Ramon and rejected Castaños's desire to rekindle their relationship. Before he left, Claudia threatened Castaños saying he would be sorry. After locking the door behind him, Claudia went upstairs to tuck her children in bed and went to sleep.

A few hours later on 24 April 1989, at around four in the morning, Claudia awoke to loud voices in her head. She stated that the voices told her Mazatlan had disappeared and that "all of Queretaro was a spirit". Desperate, Claudia called her friend Veronica Vazquez who asked Claudia to calm down. Veronica promised to come in the morning to help her. Following the call, Claudia got out of bed, dressed, went to the kitchen and took three knives while her children were still sleeping.

At about five in the morning Claudia woke up her 6-year-old son Alfredo and attacked him with a knife. Leaning on his bed, she grabbed his left hand and completely amputated it. Alfredo screamed out which awoke his eldest sister, 11-year-old Claudia Maria, came to the room and begged her mother to stop. Switching knives, Claudia rushed over her eldest daughter and stabbed her six times. Wounded, Claudia María managed to leave the room and loudly pleaded her mother for mercy. The screams woke the neighbors. Claudia took the third knife and stabbed her nine-year-old daughter Ana Belén in the heart. Claudia ran downstairs, searching for Claudia Maria who had fainted on the dining room floor and stabbed her again. She then dragged her upstairs and placed her lifeless body in the master bedroom.

=== Crime scene and evidence ===
Pictures taken in the crime site

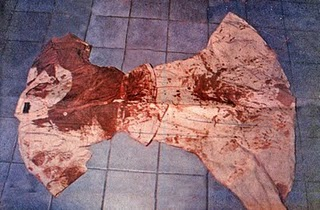
The dress that Mijangos used during the murders.

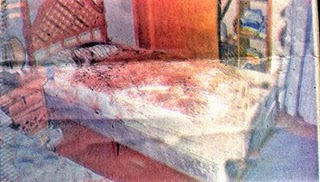
Bed in the principal room, there she placed the bodies.

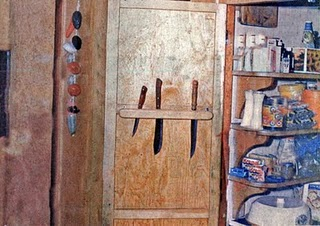
Knives set in the kitchen, the weapons that she used are not shown.
