= Ciudad Juárez rehab center attack =

2009 mass shooting in Mexico

- Chihuahua state in Mexico
- Location: El Aliviane centre, Ciudad Juárez, Chihuahua, Mexico
- Date: 2 September 2009; 17 years ago 7:15 p.m. MDT (1:15 a.m.UTC)
- Attack type: Mass shooting
- Deaths: 18
- Injuries: 3
- Perpetrator: Exact number unknown (at least several gunmen)

The Ciudad Juárez rehab center attack was a shooting that occurred at 7:15 pm on September 2, 2009, at the El Aliviane drug treatment clinic in the city of Ciudad Juárez, Mexico. Seventeen men were killed in the attack, and another died the following day from injuries, bringing the total killed to eighteen.

Authorities believe the attack was part of a turf battle, one of the deadliest such shootings in Ciudad Juárez since President Felipe Calderón initiated a 2006 crackdown on gangs dealing drugs.

On the same day as the attack, Michoacán's deputy director of public safety, José Manuel Revuelta was killed alongside two bodyguards after two weeks in that post, the highest profile person to be killed in Mexico's drug violence. This rehab center shooting was described as a "copycat incident" to one where eight people were killed in a similar shooting in 2008.

== Background ==
El Aliviane is one of 62 rehabilitation centers that operate in Ciudad Juárez, a city of 1.5 million people. It is privately run and located in a neighborhood next to the United States border. The facilities are housed in a converted home.

State security minister Víctor Valencia de los Santos told El Universal prior to the shooting that Mexico's rehab centers were "the breeding ground for criminal gangs". He said: "In this type of place, the drug cartels are recruiting youngsters from 17 to 23 years of age". President Calderón was delivering his annual state of the union address around the time of the shootings and defended his efforts to beat the drug gangs.

== Shooting ==
The gunners tore through the door of the centre, breaking it down in the process. Eighteen patients were forced into a central corridor, lined up against a wall, and shot dead by hooded gunmen.

Details about the identities of victims are scarce. Women have demanded answers by gathering outside the offices of prosecutors to cry. One woman, Elisabeth Quintero, said three of her relatives were among the dead; her 16-year-old son, her 28-year-old brother and her 21-year-old cousin. She described her son as a "delinquent" but did not specify the addiction problems of her three family members. 17-year-old Jaime Saúl Pérez was beginning to "turn his life around" by asking for assistance with his urges for marijuana. His father, Jaime Valle, claimed he had never been in any other sort of trouble and would have returned to his home by now if he were alive. Valle commented: "I want justice! Kill those ungrateful dogs that are going around killing innocent people. Justice! I want justice!"

No suspects were named in the immediate aftermath. The El Diario newspaper reported that a number of victims belonged to the Barrio Azteca gang, which is believed to be aligned with the Juarez Cartel.

On September 3, it was reported that neighbors mopped blood from the sidewalk outside the crime scene.

== See also ==
- 2010 Chihuahua shootings
