= Coatzacoalcos nightclub fire =

2019 Event in the Mexican Drug War

- Date: August 27, 2019
- Location: Coatzacoalcos, Veracruz, Mexico
- Type: Arson
- Deaths: 31
- Injuries: 11

On the evening of August 27, 2019, a fire started in a nightclub in Coatzacoalcos, Veracruz, Mexico. The fire killed 31 people. It was started by what are believed to be members of the Jalisco New Generation Cartel, who blocked its exits.

== Attack ==
It is believed that unidentified members of the Jalisco drug cartel were angered at the bar owner's refusal to pay extortion demands, and burst into the bar at gunpoint. The unknown assailants then locked the doors and other emergency exits of the club and then doused the building with gasoline and set it on fire. Prior to the attack the owner was kidnapped by the same group of individuals.

Early reports of the attacks claimed that the fire had been started by homemade bombs, although this statement was later recanted.

== Victims ==
Thirty-one people were killed in the attack. Around 24 people died during the initial fire attack and seven more died later in the hospital. Of those dead, there were ten women and sixteen men. Most of those that were killed were Mexican nationals; two of the deceased victims were, however, Filipino sailors on shore leave.

== Response ==
President Andrés Manuel López Obrador stated that the attack "degrades us as a society, as a government, as a nation". The Governor of Veracruz, Cuitláhuac García Jiménez, used Twitter to condemn the attack.

Many were quick to point to the resemblance of a fire started by Los Zetas drug cartel at a casino eight years prior, which killed 52 people in Monterrey, Nuevo León.
