= 2010 San Fernando massacre =

2010 mass murder in San Fernando, Mexico

- Part of the Mexican drug war
- Victims of the massacre

- 2010 San Fernando massacre (Tamaulipas) 2010 San Fernando massacre (Mexico)
- Location: 24°55′46″N 97°56′44″W; San Fernando, Tamaulipas, Mexico
- Date: 24 August 2010; 16 years ago
- Target: Civilians and Gulf Cartel hitmen
- Attack type: Mass murder, kidnapping
- Deaths: 72
- Injuries: 3
- Perpetrator: Los Zetas

The 2010 San Fernando massacre, also known as the first massacre of San Fernando, was the mass murder of 72 undocumented immigrants by the Los Zetas drug cartel in the village of El Huizachal in the municipality of San Fernando, Tamaulipas, Mexico. The 72 killed—58 men and 14 women—were mainly from Central and South America, and they were shot in the back of the head and then piled up together. The bodies were found inside a ranch on 24 August 2010 by the Mexican military after they engaged in an armed confrontation with members of a drug cartel. They received information of the place after the sole survivor survived a shot to the neck and face, faked his death, and then fled to a military checkpoint to seek help. Investigators later mentioned that the massacre was a result of the immigrants' refusal to work for Los Zetas, or to provide money for their release.

On 17 June 2011 the Federal Police captured Édgar Huerta Montiel, alias El Wache, the major perpetrator of the mass murder. His contention was that the immigrants were killed because Los Zetas believed that they were going to be recruited by the Gulf Cartel, a rival gang. He also confessed that other bodies were put in mass graves. The immigrants were abducted from several buses, the same way others were abducted for the 2011 San Fernando massacre. The police chief that was in charge of leading the investigation of the massacre was killed by suspected members of a drug cartel.

The massacre was reported as "the biggest single discovery of its kind" in the Mexican drug war, and as "the worst known atrocity committed by Mexico's drug trafficking organization to date". The National Alliance of Latin American and Caribbean Communities asked for those responsible "to be brought to justice for such atrocity", and Amnesty International said that this "human rights crisis" is a result of "one of the most dangerous trajectories" undocumented immigrants have to cross before reaching the United States. The Mexican drug trafficking organizations often use vacant lots, ranches, and mine shafts to keep their victims and execute their rivals. Nonetheless, in 2010, this was the largest body dumping ground found since the start of Mexico's drug war.

The massacre was condemned by a number of countries and international organizations. Felipe Calderón, the president of Mexico at the time, condemned the massacre and sent his condolences to the families of those affected.

== Background ==
=== Illegal immigration in Mexico ===
The routes of illegal immigration in Mexico are stalked with "kidnappers, murderers, rapists and corrupt officials", and are regarded as "one of the most perilous migration routes in the world." Every year, tens of thousands of poor immigrants from Central and South America start their journey up to the north. Nonetheless, in the past few years, their journey "has become a horror show." According to Amnesty International, armed and violent robberies used to be the biggest threat to those traveling up north; nowadays, kidnappings by organized crime groups are the norm (in this case, Los Zetas). Typically, the kidnappers keep the victims in safe houses for days until relatives of the victims in the United States or back home raise money to free the captives. Torture is a common method used in incidents like this, and several victims have claimed after their liberation that they have seen people killed before their eyes for failing to pay their ransom. Rape is also common in the migrants' journey, and even smugglers have advised women to carry contraceptive injections before starting their journeys. The migrants are also exploited, beaten, extorted, and abused by "authorities and criminals alike".

The National Human Rights Commission reported that "nearly 10,000 migrants were kidnapped in Mexico during a six-month period [in 2009]." The Mexican government, as a result, has been criticized for not providing "adequate security" for the migrants in its country. This massacre was the third time since the start of the Mexican drug war that the Mexican authorities had "discovered large masses of corpses." The first one was in Taxco, Guerrero, where several mass graves held up to 55 bodies. The second incident happened in Nuevo León, where more than 70 bodies were found. In addition, the killings of the migrants highlighted an under-reported but highly profitable business: the kidnapping of migrants for money and work by the drug cartels in Mexico.

Migrants in Mexico are facing a major human rights crisis leaving them with virtually no access to justice, fearing reprisals and deportation if they complain of abuses. Persistent failure by the authorities to tackle abuses carried out against irregular migrants has made their journey through Mexico one of the most dangerous in the world.

— Amnesty International, a non-governmental organisation focused on human rights.

=== Before the violence ===
Local residents claim that arms trafficking, car thefts, and drug trade have "always existed" in San Fernando, but in 2004 Los Zetas arrived in the area. They began to establish themselves little by little, and local residents remember seeing convoys of "luxurious trucks entering and leaving the city, going into stores and buying goods". They claimed that before the Mexican drug war (which began in 2006) and the rupture between the Gulf Cartel and Los Zetas (which happened in early 2010), the cartels "would not kidnap or steal. In fact, they would always pay for the goods they bought in stores." They would live outside the city limits in ranches. But then they began to live in city neighborhoods, and the "people started to get involved with them." A local resident claimed that many families had "at least one member involved in the drug trade", and that is why he claims many in San Fernando were scared when the violence erupted. His mother gave instructions on what to do if he is kidnapped by the cartels:

If they come for you, do not let them take you alive. We will at least know where you are and we will have your body with us to mourn.

=== Gulf-Zeta cartels split ===
Before the violence erupted in Tamaulipas, San Fernando was known for its bass fishing and dove hunting, and the area had long been popular with outdoor enthusiasts from Texas and other US states. One day, a group of dove hunters from Houston, Texas, reported being assaulted by a group of heavily armed gunmen in San Fernando. On 26 June 2010, just outside San Fernando, 15 bodies were found on Federal Highway 101. The violence between the Gulf Cartel and Los Zetas, their former armed wing, continued.

In 2010, Los Zetas broke apart from the Gulf Cartel and both organizations began to turn their weapons against each other. The clash between these two groups first happened in Reynosa, Tamaulipas, and then expanded to Nuevo Laredo and Matamoros. The war then spread out through 11 municipalities of Tamaulipas, 9 of them bordering the state of Texas. Soon, the violence generated between these two groups had spread to Tamaulipas' neighboring states of Nuevo León and Veracruz. In the midsts of violence and panic, local authorities and the media tried to minimize the situation and claim that "nothing was occurring", but the facts were impossible to cover up. Confrontations between these two groups paralyzed entire cities in broad daylight. Several witnesses claimed that many of the municipalities throughout Tamaulipas were "war zones", and that many businesses and houses were burned down, leaving areas in "total destruction". The bloodbath in Tamaulipas has caused thousands of deaths, but many of the shootings and killings often go unreported.

In the city of San Fernando, Tamaulipas, the Gulf Cartel forces of Antonio Cárdenas Guillén, alias Tony Tormenta, "strung the bodies of fallen Zetas and their associates from light poles". The Gulf Cartel lashed out to attack Los Zetas at their stronghold in San Fernando. According to The Monitor, the municipality of San Fernando is a "virtual spiderweb" of dirt roads that connect with Monterrey, Nuevo Laredo, Reynosa, and Matamoros—making it a prized territory for drug traffickers. In January 2011, Nancy Davis, a US missionary, was traveling with her husband Sam through the municipality of San Fernando. According to Pharr, Texas police, the Davises encountered a group of heavily armed men, who tried to force their blue 2008 Chevrolet 2500 pickup off the highway. When they tried to flee, the gunmen shot at them, striking Nancy in the head. Sam drove back to McAllen, Texas, where his wife was pronounced dead.

The first shootout that occurred in San Fernando in 2010 happened near a hospital. According to local residents, heavily armed gunmen began to fight in certain avenues throughout the city, and even shot the police station. None of the shootings made it on the news. A man who was interviewed mentioned that even before the two massacres were discovered, people were being kidnapped at an alarming rate, but "they were scared" of the reprisals by the cartels. He went on to say that the cartels had San Fernando "under control", and that they "were the authority". Witnesses stated that the cartels would enter the city "in convoys with more than 200 SUVs", and that the policemen were no challenge for them. The cartel gunmen wore military uniform, were heavily armed, and would constantly attack policemen and other civilians alike.

== Massacre ==
The 72 immigrants were traveling through Tamaulipas to the United States when a convoy of Los Zetas surrounded their vehicles and cut them off the road. Then, they were forced to get out of their vehicles, and the gunmen warned them that they were members of Los Zetas. They were taken to a warehouse inside a ranch, where one by one, the immigrants were put on their knees and placed against a wall. They were told to remain with their knees on the ground, and then they were shot, one by one, in the back of the head. There was one survivor—an Ecuadorian—who was shot in the neck and faked his death until the perpetrators left the area. He then traveled more than 22 kilometers until he reached a military checkpoint where he notified the Mexican marines of the area where the massacre had occurred. The man was placed under the protection of federal authorities.

When he was asked what had happened, he mentioned that they did not have money to pay for the ransom, and that the killers had forced them to work as hitmen for Los Zetas, and that they would receive over US$1000 every fifteen days. All of the immigrants resisted, and were consequently killed. He said that more than 70 corpses were in the ranch, and that some of the women were pregnant. At first, the authorities did not believe the survivor (since there had been similar occasions that have resulted in ambushes), but a commander of the military led an operative to the ranch where the bodies were allegedly located. When they arrived to the area by helicopter and by ground, the members of Los Zetas that were guarding the area received the Mexican authorities with bullets. The shootings lasted all day, and the Mexican military had to retreat at nighttime to the municipality of Matamoros in order to avoid a possible ambush. The next day, the Mexican military, with more personnel and ammunition, arrived at the ranch and discovered the 72 bodies. All of them were handcuffed and blindfolded.

The reports of the massacre were not officially known till later that night, since the ranch was deep inside the countryside and because the area was insecure. In the confrontations between the Mexican military and Los Zetas, 1 marine and 3 criminals were killed. The other drug cartel members managed to escape the scene. Twenty-one rifles, 101 ammunition clips, four bullet-proof vests, camouflage uniforms and four vehicles were seized by officials. The authorities also found a "replica" truck of the Mexican Naval Infantry.

=== Survivor's testimony ===
An 18-year-old Ecuadorian, identified as "Luis", was one of the survivors of the massacre of the 72 migrants in San Fernando, Tamaulipas. According to his narrative, he went from his homeland to the country of Honduras, then traveled to Guatemala, where he stayed for 15 days. He later traveled by speedboat to Mexico, and later made it to the coastal state of Veracruz, where he was transported to Tamaulipas. On Saturday 22 August 2010 at around 10 p.m., three trucks surrounded the vehicle in which he was traveling, and about eight heavily armed men got off their vehicles and took the migrants in two trucks. The migrants and Luis were then taken to a house where they remained there for a day, and then they were taken to the warehouse where the massacre occurred.

Luis explained how the migrants entered the warehouse where they were killed in a row, and once they were inside, they bandaged their eyes. They were forced to stand up for around 20 minutes, while Luis said that he thought "they were waiting for nightfall", and then they were placed with their backs on the wall. The gunmen told them to lie face down, be quiet, and not scream, because they were going to kill them if they did. "Then they started shooting", Luis said, and one of the migrants yelled that he was not scared of them. He was shot too. Everyone was shot one by one, "until it was my turn", Luis said. Then, they shot him, and Luis pretended to be dead.

After everyone was shot, the killers left the warehouse, and Luis waited around two minutes and then took off out of the warehouse. He "walked all night", and then saw a "small light far away", and made it to a house where he asked for help. Luis got to the place with a lot of pain, asking for help, but the people were scared and refused to help him. Consequently, Luis walked until sunrise, and at around 6 a.m. he saw the Mexican marines, and asked them for help.

=== Government's response ===
The turf war between Los Zetas and the Gulf Cartel, two powerful drug trafficking organizations who operate in northeastern Mexico and in Tamaulipas, were blamed by the Mexican authorities for the massacre of the 72 migrants. Alejandro Poiré Romero, the security spokesman of Mexico, mentioned that the massacre occurred in an area in Mexico increasingly under the influence of drug violence between Los Zetas and the Gulf Cartel, who fight for the control of the drug corridors into the United States. In order to finance their organizations and enlarge their recruitment, the drug trafficking organizations kidnapped migrants and tortured them for ransom and recruitment at gunpoint. Investigators indicated that all of the migrants either bravely resisted Los Zetas, or simply were foolhardy enough to say no.

== Aftermath ==
=== Investigation ===
On 27 August 2010, the Mexican authorities had already identified 31 of the 72 immigrants killed. All of the bodies were transferred to the city of Reynosa for further investigation. The top investigator of the massacre, Roberto Jaime Suárez, went missing along with another police officer in San Fernando, Tamaulipas, on 25 August 2010. The president of Mexico, Felipe Calderón, said that Suárez was the top investigator of the massacre, but now the Attorney General of Mexico leads the investigation. Soon after the attacks in Tamaulipas, the flow of migrants from Central and South America had decreased, but eight months later, the flow went back to its previous figures.

The Mexican authorities concluded that those captured by Los Zetas in this incident were 77 people—72 of them who were killed, 3 that survived, and 2 that remain missing. The two that went missing were Mexicans: the bus driver and his copilot. It has not been proven whether the missing persons had ties with Los Zetas or whether they were simply guiding the migrants.

=== Social movement ===
In November 2010, the families of the victims gathered in San Fernando, Tamaulipas, for a ceremony in honor of those killed. The families urged the state government of Tamaulipas to clarify the investigation. This movement was part of the caravan known as Madres Buscando a sus Hijos ("Mothers Looking for their Children"), a group of protestors demanding action from the authorities for the disappearances in Mexico. A group of 40 women activists traveled from Honduras to San Fernando, Tamaulipas, Mexico, in March 2012 through the same routes undocumented immigrants go through on their way to the United States. The movement's goal was to "bring a face" to the 72 immigrants killed, and to protest against the continuing "kidnappings, disappearances, murders, abuses, and extortions" the immigrants face when traveling.

=== Website and book ===
After the massacre of the 72 migrants in Tamaulipas, several "authors, journalists, analysts, activists, political scientists, and artists" brought homage to those killed with a book, a webpage, and several mentions in the official radio station of National Autonomous University of Mexico. The project and website, known as 72migrantes.com, hopes to bring back the "faces" of those killed, those that the media has "categorized as corpses", but who in reality were living people at one point, "people with dreams and aspirations that were taken away." Roses can be sent to a "virtual altar" online where the 72 migrants are remembered.

=== Arrests ===
The Federal Police captured Édgar Huerta Montiel, alias El Wache, a high-ranking lieutenant of Los Zetas and the main person responsible of the killings of the 72 immigrants, on 17 June 2011 in Fresnillo, Zacatecas. Huerta Montiel was an army deserter before joining Los Zetas. Huerta Montiel was the boss of Martín Estrada Luna, alias El Kilo, one of the main perpetrators of the second massacre in San Fernando, where 193 corpses were exhumed from clandestine mass graves. After his apprehension, he confessed to having ordered the abduction of the buses in which the immigrants were traveling. The captured lieutenant confessed to have personally killed 10 immigrants, and mentioned that he had kidnapped other buses with immigrants near San Fernando, Tamaulipas, to steal their money, torture them for information and see if "they were not working for the Gulf Cartel." He mentioned that those killed were going to be recruited by Samuel Flores Borrego, a high-ranking lieutenant of the Gulf Cartel, and that those who were not were released.

Some of the bodies were buried in various mass graves. Huerta Montiel then went on to say that "more than 600 bodies" are buried in clandestine mass graves near San Fernando, but the Mexican authorities never confirmed it. 21 other suspects responsible for the massacre were apprehended too. By 21 August 2011, the Mexican authorities had detained 81 members of Los Zetas implicated in the massacre of the 72 immigrants. None of them, however, had been sentenced, and the authorities refused to comment on the issue. In addition, those detained said that they killed the immigrants because Heriberto Lazcano, the supreme leader of the whole Los Zetas organization, had ordered their executions.

=== Second massacre ===
Between 6 April and 7 June 2011, the Mexican authorities found 193 people buried in clandestine mass graves in San Fernando, Tamaulipas. Authorities investigating the massacre reported numerous hijackings of passenger buses on Mexican Federal Highway 101 in San Fernando, and the kidnapped victims were later killed and buried in 47 clandestine mass graves. The investigations began immediately after several suitcases and baggage were unclaimed in Reynosa and Matamoros, Tamaulipas. According to the testimony of a killer, kidnapped victims were forced to fight to death with the other victims.

== Reactions ==
=== Mexico ===
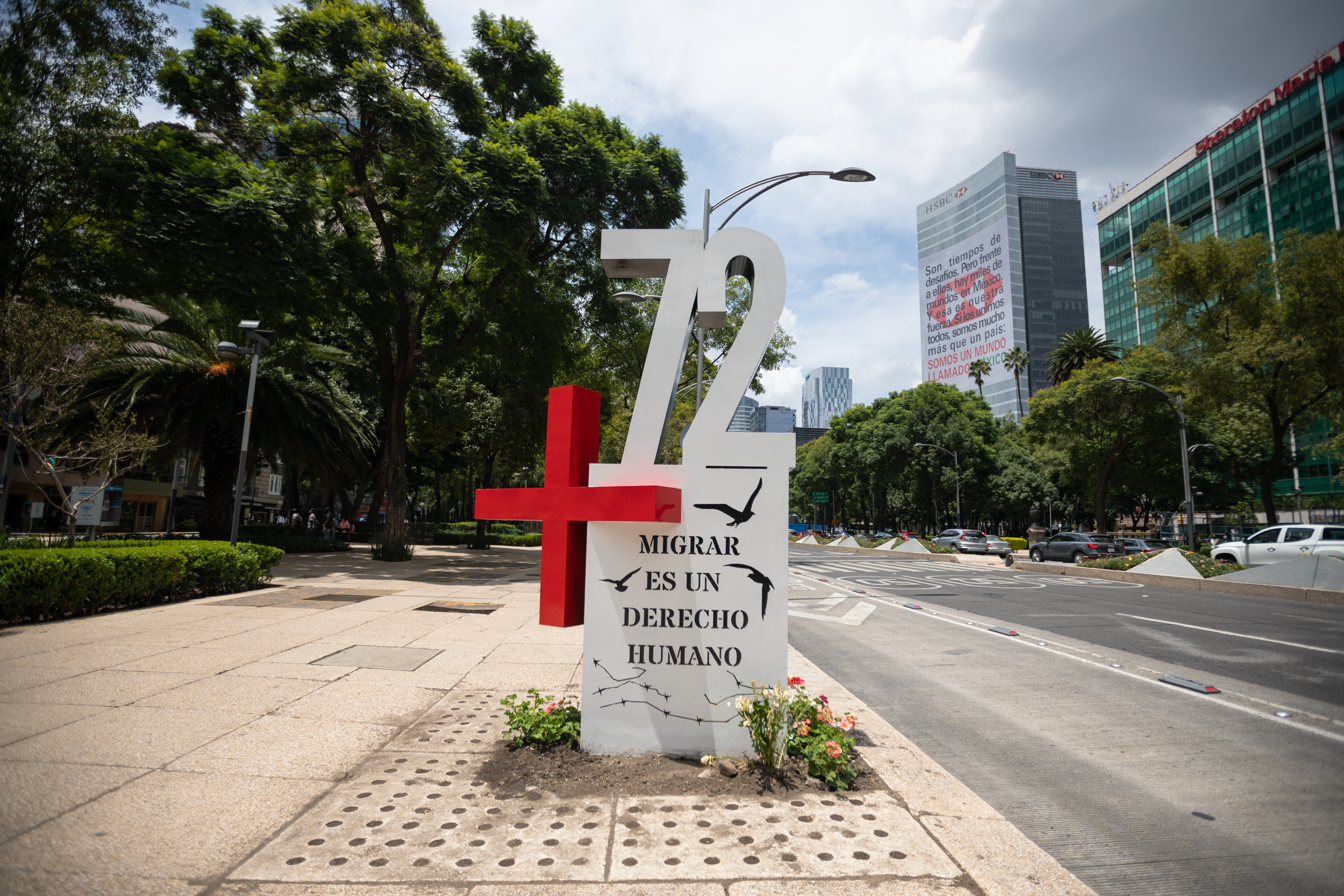
Antimonumento +72 in Mexico City

The president of Mexico, Felipe Calderón Hinojosa, said immediately through Twitter after the incident that he sends his most profound condolences and repudiates what happened in Tamaulipas. That same night, the President issued a communiqué saying that "these incidents are a result of the war between Los Zetas and the Gulf Cartel", two rivaling drug groups in Tamaulipas. And, Calderón mentioned that the drug cartels have been relying on extortion and kidnappings as a way of financing their institutions and improving their recruitments. Alejandro Poiré Romero, the former security spokesman for Mexico, claimed that Los Zetas has been kidnapping immigrants and other civilians and recruiting them by force due to the hard hits it has received from the Mexican government. The former Secretary of Interior, Francisco Blake Mora, affirmed that the Mexican government will work with "greater intelligence agencies and with more federal agents were it is needed" to combat the criminal organizations where it is required to do so. He also mentioned that the Mexican government will not hesitate to restore order and protect the migrants.

An "anti-monument" in the form of +72 was erected on 22 August 2020 on Paseo de la Reforma in Mexico City in front of the US Embassy to commemorate the massacre.

=== International reactions ===
- Brazil: The Federal government of Brazil urged for clarity in the investigations, and asked the authorities to bring those responsible to justice. Brazil also sent three policemen to help the Mexican authorities identify the bodies of the four Brazilians killed in the massacre.
- Ecuador: The government of Ecuador asked for a "rigorous investigation" for the six Ecuadorians killed in the massacre. They also condemned the attacks and promised to provide "maximum protection" to migrants, urging to castigate the criminal groups who abuse and control human smuggling rings. In addition, they criticized the media for publishing the images of the survivor of the massacre, an Ecuadorian. Rafael Correa, the president of Ecuador, said that the massacre is indescribable.
- El Salvador: The president of El Salvador, Mauricio Funes, condemned the massacre in Tamaulipas and the death of the 13 Salvadorans. He asked the Mexican government to work together with El Salvador to fight organized crime, and also sent his condolences to the Mexican people and to those in El Salvador. Funes believes that this massacre in Tamaulipas should "bring all of the world leaders" together to fight organized crime, because every country has to fight "the drug trafficking organizations, crime, arms trafficking, money laundering, and human smuggling" in unison.
- Guatemala: The government of Guatemala urged the Mexican government to find those responsible of the massacre of the 13 Guatemalans, who had not been identified. Soon after the killings, the Guatemalan authorities began an investigation on the expedients of 51 possible migrants who might be the ones killed. The president of that time, Álvaro Colom, said that this massacre "sets a new challenge and threat for immigration; drug trafficking had never been involved in human smuggling as they do now." The "heroism of the migrants", he said, "now have to overcome the threats and aggressions of the organized crime groups." Colom asked for a profound investigation by the Mexican authorities.
- Honduras: The government of Honduras condemned the "abomination" in Tamaulipas, and urged the Mexican government uncover the incidents in the massacre and carry out the investigation "in the clearest way possible". The president, Porfirio Lobo, asked the Mexican authorities to "stop the abuses, extorsions, and rapes that the migrants are subject to on their way to the United States." Lobo promised to help the families get the bodies of their loved ones after the proper investigations have concluded.
- Venezuela: The Chancellor of Venezuela, Nicolás Maduro, along with Hugo Chávez, expressed their repudiation for the massacre in Tamaulipas and sent his condolences to the families of those affected. The chancellor declared that the Venezuelan government would work with the Mexican authorities to find those responsible. Maduro asked for the governments of Latin America and the world to join powers to stop the criminal organizations that are trying to subjugate society, and mentioned that the massacre in Tamaulipas was "one of the most horrifying incidents" in contemporary time.

== See also ==
- 2011 Durango massacres
- 2011 San Fernando massacre
- 2011–12 in the Mexican drug war
- Coahuila mass graves
- List of massacres in Mexico
- Nuevo León mass graves
