= 2019 Villa Unión shootout =

2019 shootout in Villa Unión, Coahuila, Mexico

Coordinates: 28°13′13″N 100°43′28″W

- Part of Mexican drug war
Date	30 November 2019
Location	Villa Unión, Coahuila, Mexico
Status	The Army and the National Guard install a temporary base in the town after the attacks

Belligerents
Villa Unión Police reinforcement: Mexico: SEDENA Mexican Army SEMAR National Guard Coahuila Civil Force	Cartel del Noreste

Strength
	~150 gunmen +25 vehicles

Casualties and losses
4 killed, 6 wounded	19 killed, 31 arrested (after pursuit)
- 2 abducted and slain, 4 abducted and wounded

On 30 November 2019, a shootout broke out in Villa Unión, Coahuila, between a drug cartel, suspected to be the Cartel del Noreste, and police. Cartel forces attacked with a convoy of armed pickup trucks around noon. Villa Unión's town hall, the intended recipient of the attack, was targeted because it is the headquarters of the town's police force, leaving it badly damaged. Unverified videos showed smoke rising from the city. Vehicles were stolen and several civilians were kidnapped by the cartel during their retreat. In the following days, state forces pursued the cartels responsible for the attack, with 7 gang members killed on 1 December.
