= San Miguel Totolapan massacre =

2022 civilian attack

- Part of Mexican drug war
- Location: San Miguel Totolapan, Guerrero, Mexico
- Date: October 5, 2022; 2pm - ~2:15 pm
- Deaths: 20 killed
- Perpetrator: Los Tequileros cartel

On October 5, 2022, gunmen allegedly associated with the Los Tequileros cartel killed over 20 people, including the town mayor Conrado Mendoza Almeda, in San Miguel Totolapan, Guerrero, Mexico.

== Prelude ==
The Los Tequileros cartel was founded in the town of San Antonio La Gavia, in the municipality of San Miguel Totolapan, by Raybel Jacobo de Almonte after a falling out with leadership of the La Familia Michoacana cartel in 2016. The group originally conducted kidnappings and torture of municipal leaders and mayors of the towns, with Juan Mendoza Acosta, the then-mayor of San Miguel Totolapan, expressing support for the group after being threatened. While local law enforcement and leaders were pressured into allying with Los Tequileros, most civilians of San Miguel Totolapan were against the cartel. In 2016, a small uprising began in the town after disgruntled civilians abducted seventeen alleged Tequileros supporters, including the mother of Almonte (El Tequilero). The uprising ended peacefully, although the city council was vacant afterward.

In 2018, El Tequilero was shot dead in a battle with police along with twelve other cartel members, and Mexican authorities believed with his death came the dissolution of Los Tequileros.

Shortly before the attack in San Miguel Totolapan, several members of Los Tequileros released a video on social media claiming to reform and continue fighting against LFM. They also claimed responsibility for the death of the municipality's director of Rural Development, who was presumed to have died in a car accident on October 3.

== Massacre ==
At around 2pm on October 5, several groups of armed people appeared in the streets of San Miguel Totolapan. Access to the town was blocked by trucks. The armed men were wearing ski masks, and both attacks were conducted using two SUVs. The first attack occurred at a private home a block away from the town hall, where mayor Conrado Mendoza Almeda was hosting a meeting with municipal leaders. Everyone present was assassinated, including Mendoza Almeda, his father and former mayor Juan Mendoza Acosta; Fredi Martinez Suazo, the director of Public Security; Roberto Mata Marcial, advisor to the mayor; Genesis Araujo Marcos, administrator of Sanitation; Samuel Garcia and Jose Antolin Calvo Caballero, both escorts to the mayor, and three other residents of the house, including a US citizen.

The second attack, carried out in tandem to the first, occurred at the town hall. Seven police officers and one passerby were killed, and shots were reported in other houses and parts of the town afterward. A survivor of the attack claimed it lasted only 10 to 15 minutes total.

== Aftermath ==
The governor of Guerrero, where San Miguel Totolapan is located, stated on Twitter that "There will be no impunity for the malicious aggression against the municipal president and local government officials." Survivors of the massacre claimed it was the deadliest event in the town in twenty years. Twenty people were killed in total, and there were so many victims a backhoe was rented to bury all of them.
