= Alianza Americas =

Pan-American non-profit organization

- Founded: 2004
- Type: 501(c)(3)
- Location: Chicago, Illinois
- Members: 50 organizations, approx.
- Key people: Oscar A. Chacón (Co-Founder and Executive Director)
- Website: www.alianzaamericas.org
- Formerly called: National Alliance of Latin American and Caribbean Communities (NALACC)

The Alianza Americas, formerly the National Alliance of Latin American and Caribbean Communities (NALACC) until 2015, is a pan-American non-profit organization based in Hispanic and Latino American and Caribbean immigrant communities in the United States.

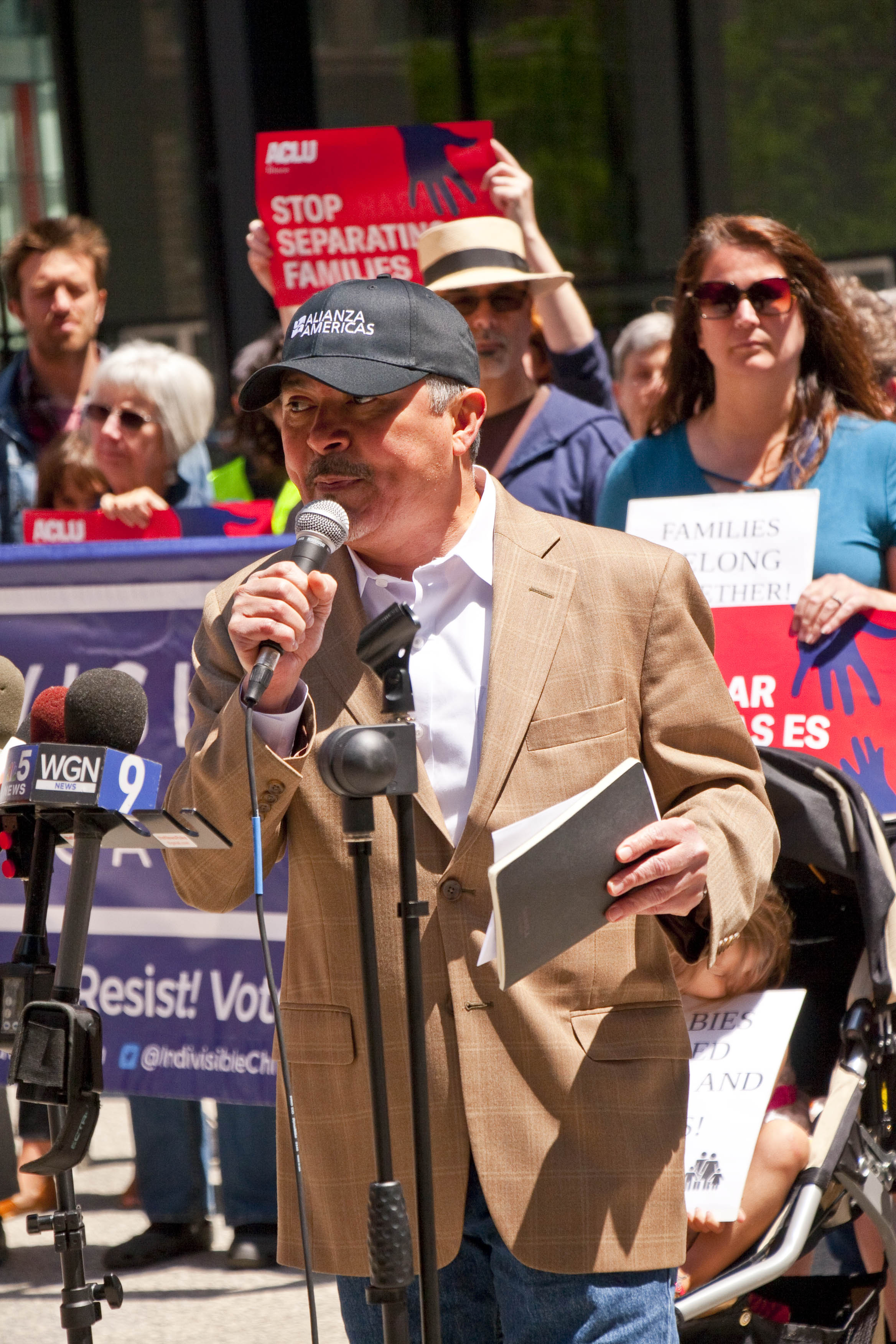
Oscar Chacón speaks at Stop Separating Immigrant Families event in Chicago, 2018.

It organizes a network of over 50 immigrant-led community organizations that work to improve the quality of life in their communities, both in the United States and in their countries of origin. Alianza Americas also seeks to build transnational leadership capacity and increase immigrant civic participation, reform public policy, and address everyday challenges faced by immigrants in the United States.
