= San Fernando, Tamaulipas =

San Fernando Municipio de San Fernando
- City and municipality
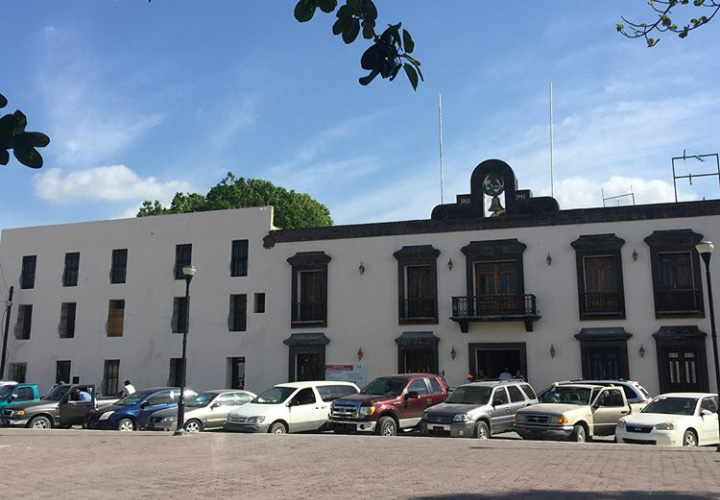
- Municipal Presidency of San Fernando, Tamaulipas

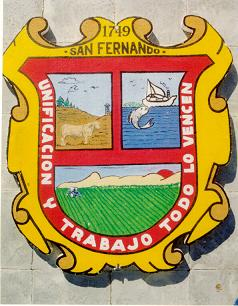
- Coat of arms

- Location within Tamaulipas Location within Mexico
- Coordinates: 24°50′53″N 98°9′34″W
- Country: Mexico
- State: Tamaulipas
- Municipality: San Fernando
- Founded: March 19, 1749

Government
  - Presidente Municipal: José Rios Silva

Area
  - Total: 6,091.36 km^{2} (2,351.89 sq mi)
- Elevation: 40 m (130 ft)

Population (2020)
  - Total: 28,215
  - Municipality: 51,405
- Time zone: UTC-6 (CST)
- Codigo Postal: 87600
- Area code: 841
- Website: http://www.sanfernando.gob.mx/

San Fernando is a city located in the Mexican state of Tamaulipas; it serves as the seat of the surrounding municipality of the same name. It is about 85 miles (137 km) away from Brownsville, Texas, United States. The municipality has a population of 57,220, while the city itself has a population of 29,665.

== History ==
=== Massacres ===
San Fernando, Tamaulipas, is notorious for experiencing two of the largest recorded massacres of the Mexican drug war. The first massacre, known as the 2010 San Fernando massacre, occurred following a gunfight in Tamaulipas between drug cartel gunmen and Mexican authorities, in which three gunmen and a marine were killed. After the authorities patrolled the nearby area, they discovered 72 bodies in a remote ranch in Tamaulipas. The bodies were found in a room, some of which were piled up on top of each other. It was "the biggest single discovery of its kind" in the ongoing drug war. The 58 men and 14 women were believed to be undocumented migrants from South and Central America trying to cross the border to the United States. A surviving migrant claims that the migrants were kidnapped by the Los Zetas cartel and killed for refusing to do work for them. Twenty one rifles, 101 ammunition clips, four bullet-proof vests, camouflage uniforms and four vehicles were seized by officials.

The second massacre, the 2011 San Fernando massacre, was discovered after Mexican authorities exhumed more than 40 mass graves, with a final body count of 193 corpses.

The massacres and the Mexican government's response are the subject of San Fernando: Última Parada, a book written by journalist Marcela Turati.

== Climate ==
San Fernando has a humid subtropical climate (Köppen: Cfa) bordering closely with a hot semi-arid climate (Köppen: BSh).

Climate data for San Fernando (1991–2020)
Month	Jan	Feb	Mar	Apr	May	Jun	Jul	Aug	Sep	Oct	Nov	Dec	Year
Record high °C (°F)	37.6 (99.7)	39.0 (102.2)	41.5 (106.7)	43.5 (110.3)	46.0 (114.8)	46.0 (114.8)	42.0 (107.6)	42.0 (107.6)	45.5 (113.9)	42.2 (108.0)	42.6 (108.7)	38.0 (100.4)	46.0 (114.8)
Mean daily maximum °C (°F)	22.4 (72.3)	24.9 (76.8)	27.8 (82.0)	30.6 (87.1)	33.4 (92.1)	35.1 (95.2)	35.4 (95.7)	36.1 (97.0)	33.5 (92.3)	30.7 (87.3)	26.2 (79.2)	23.2 (73.8)	29.9 (85.8)
Daily mean °C (°F)	16.4 (61.5)	18.6 (65.5)	21.7 (71.1)	24.7 (76.5)	27.7 (81.9)	29.5 (85.1)	29.8 (85.6)	30.2 (86.4)	28.1 (82.6)	24.8 (76.6)	20.3 (68.5)	17.2 (63.0)	24.1 (75.4)
Mean daily minimum °C (°F)	10.4 (50.7)	12.4 (54.3)	15.6 (60.1)	18.7 (65.7)	22.0 (71.6)	23.9 (75.0)	24.2 (75.6)	24.3 (75.7)	22.6 (72.7)	18.9 (66.0)	14.4 (57.9)	11.2 (52.2)	18.2 (64.8)
Record low °C (°F)	−7.5 (18.5)	−9.5 (14.9)	−2.0 (28.4)	1.8 (35.2)	7.5 (45.5)	13.4 (56.1)	17.4 (63.3)	17.5 (63.5)	10.2 (50.4)	1.5 (34.7)	−2.5 (27.5)	−8.4 (16.9)	−9.5 (14.9)
Average precipitation mm (inches)	28.6 (1.13)	18.8 (0.74)	32.3 (1.27)	35.3 (1.39)	49.5 (1.95)	74.7 (2.94)	60.0 (2.36)	67.4 (2.65)	164.3 (6.47)	84.3 (3.32)	40.6 (1.60)	24.8 (0.98)	680.6 (26.80)
Average precipitation days (≥ 0.1 mm)	5.6	4.2	5.1	4.6	5.6	6.2	4.7	6.4	10.8	7.3	6.1	4.9	71.5
Source: Servicio Meteorologico Nacional
