= Extranormal =

Mexican paranormal television program

- Also known as: ΞX+RΛNORMΛL El Origen
- Genre: Paranormal Investigation; Supernatural; Esotericism
- Directed by: Felipe Cendejas
- Creative director: Jorge Omar Sánchez
- Presented by: List of presenters
- Narrated by: Luisa Cárdenas; Octavio Elizondo; Miriam Verdencia; Joe Herrera; Víctor Díaz
- Country of origin: Mexico
- Original language: Spanish
- No. of seasons: 11

Production
- Production company: TV Azteca: Azteca América (in America)

Original release
- Network: Azteca Trece Jalisco (21 March 2007–16 September 2007); Azteca Trece [Uno] (Mexico) (2007–2017); A Más+ (26 March 2017–31 December 2023)
- Release: March 21, 2007

Related
- Paranormal Witness; Ghost Mine; Ghost Hunters

Extranormal (stylized ΞX+RΛNORMΛL El Origen [The Beginnings]) was a Mexican paranormal television program premiered on March 21, 2007, Samantha Arteaga presents the investigations carried out by Joe Herrera (and Alberto del Arco in past seasons), guided by paranormal specialists Octavio Elizondo (harmonizer and expert in metaphysics), Miriam Verdecía (harmonizer) and Luisa Cárdenas (medium and seer), and in previous seasons Laura Rivas (paranormal investigator and spiritualist), These investigations are carried out in Mexico and around the world.

== History ==
The original idea, the format design, the character roles and the conformation of the different seasons of the program is in charge of Jorge Omar Sánchez (current executive producer), the realization is in charge of Felipe Cendejas (General Producer).

Extranormal airs for the first time in the city of Guadalajara, Jalisco on March 21, 2007, weeks later it began broadcasting in several states of the Mexican Republic, Extranormal airs on the national network for all of Mexico on September 16, 2007.

On TV Azteca, Extranormal is the first program made in the interior of the Mexican Republic, by TV Azteca Jalisco and is broadcast nationally and internationally by Azteca América and Azteca Internacional.

== From Azteca Trece to A Más ==
A new season of EXN was planned to air in May 2014 and continue on Azteca 13 (today Azteca Uno), as it would bring a renewal to the program with investigations outside of Mexico, however it was not broadcast on Azteca Trece.

The program and the new seasons were broadcast in Azteca América but only in the United States.

On June 2, 2014, the broadcast of the seventh season, the "Extranormal Septium" which was broadcast every Monday on the official page of TV Azteca, some time later it also stopped broadcasting on the official page, it was only broadcast in Azteca America in the United States.

As the program is broadcast nationally in Mexico by A Más, which promotes programming produced by TV Azteca in Mexico, the program has enjoyed some popularity. At the end of 2020 and at the beginning of 2021, it was broadcast on Azteca 7 on Fridays at 11:00 p.m.

== Cast ==
- Ivette Orozco: (2007–2010)
- Silvia Enciso: (2010–2012)
- Rosa María Martell "Rosy": (July 2012 – March 5, 2013)
- Alberto del Arco Ortiz: (2012–2014)
- Priscila Trejo: (2013–2014)
- Minerva Aponte: (2017)
- Victoria Torres: (2017-2018)
- Vania Manzano: (March 3, 2019 – October 18, 2020).
- Samantha Arteaga: (January 24, 2021–present)
