= Beer House Cantina arson =

Arson in Mexico

- Location: Beer House Cantina, San Luis Rio Colorado, Sonora, Mexico
- Date: 22 July 2023 around 1:30am
- Attack type: Arson
- Deaths: 13
- Injuries: 4
- Motive: Expelled from bar

On 22 July 2023, a 28 year old man set fire to a bar called Beer House Cantina near the US–Mexico border in San Luis Rio Colorado, Sonora, Mexico.

== Incident ==
The arsonist arrived at the bar after midnight and stayed until 1:20am when he was removed for his disrespectful behaviour towards women. After being kicked out, he went to his truck to get some gasoline which he threw and ignited at the front of the bar.

== Victims ==
12 people died at the scene, 7 men and 4 women and one woman later died on 10 August 2023 of her injuries at a hospital in Mexicali. Four others were injured. All the victims were adults except one 17-year-old.

== Investigation ==
The perpetrator was arrested hours later while trying to escape through Sonoyta towards Arizona, United States.

A police investigation concluded that the attack was not related to organized crime. The investigation also concluded that the bar had several fire safety hazards such as a lack of emergency exits, fire extinguishers and operated outside of the law. On 7 February 2024, the mayor of San Luis Rio Colorado Santos González Yescas stated that the municipality is not responsible for the fire safety of the bar.

== Reactions ==
The governor of Sonora, Alfonso Durazo condemned the attack saying "I reiterate to the people of Sonora that nothing and no one will be above the law in this state and that the person responsible will pay for their criminal act,"
