= Nuevo León mass graves =

Mass Murder in Nuevo León, New Mexico

The Nuevo León mass graves was the mass murder of over 70 people in the Nuevo León, Mexico on 25 June 2010 in several mass graves. The municipality of Juárez, Nuevo León counts with 51 of the 70 bodies found; most of the bodies were shot dead, while others were burned and mutilated.

== See also ==
- List of massacres in Mexico
- Mexican drug war
- 2011 San Fernando massacre
- 2011 Durango massacres
- Coahuila mass graves
