= Embassy of the United States, Mexico City =

Diplomatic mission of United States of America to the United Mexican States

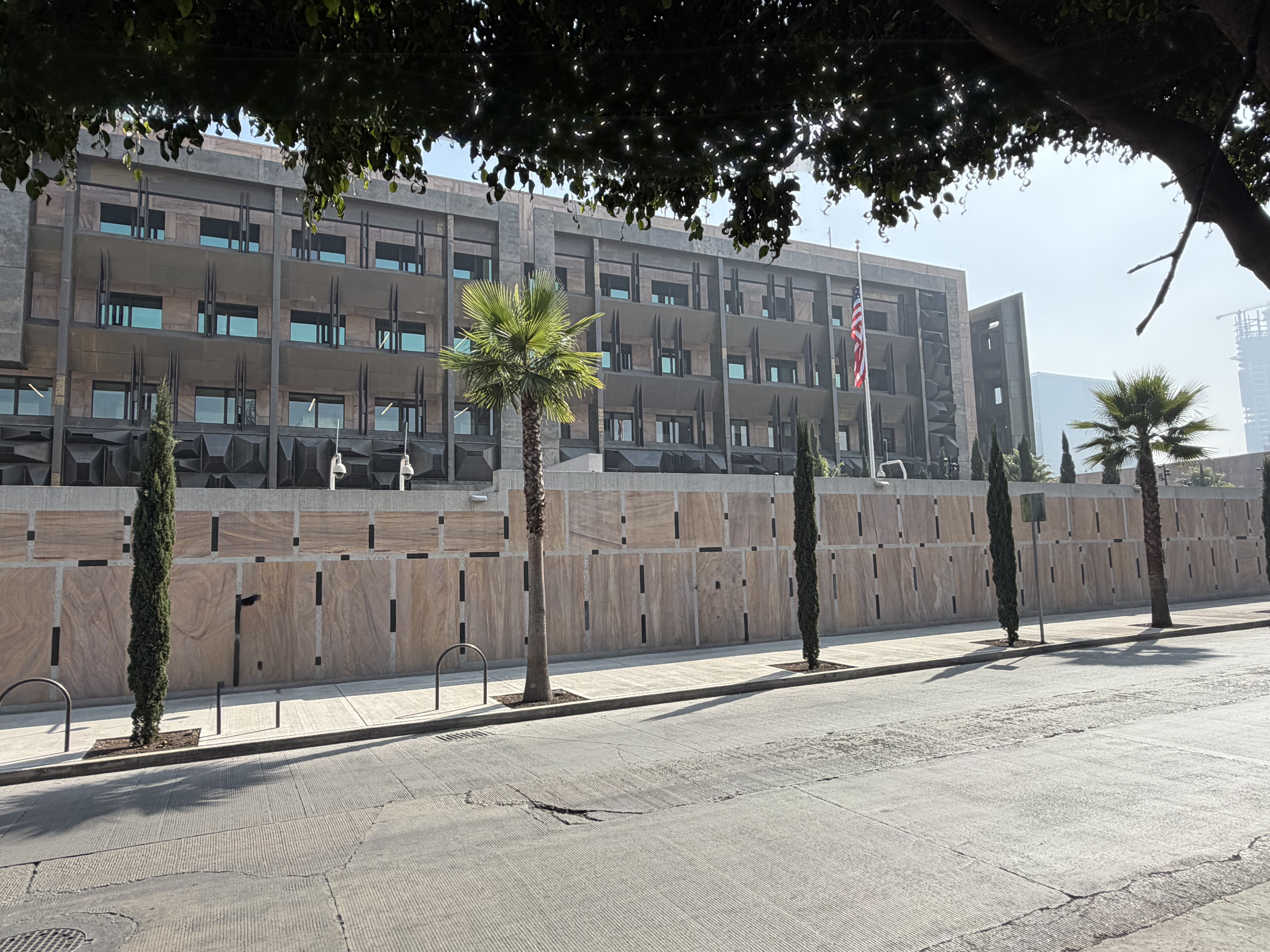
- U.S. Embassy in December 2025
- Location: Presa Angostura 225; Mexico City, Mexico
- Coordinates: 19.445889°N 99.206776°W
- Opened: 1899; 127 years ago
- Ambassador: Ronald D. Johnson (since May 2025)
- Website: https://mx.usembassy.gov

The Embassy of the United States of America in Mexico City (Spanish: Embajada de los Estados Unidos, Ciudad de México) is the diplomatic mission of United States of America to the United Mexican States. The embassy's chancery is situated on the Presa Angostura, Colonia Irrigación, Mexico City. Ronald D. Johnson is the current United States Ambassador to Mexico.

== Building ==
The first U.S. Embassy to open in Mexico City was in January 1899 after the elevation of the American Legation.

The former chancery building began in 1960 and was completed in 1964 at a cost of US$5 million. At the time, it was the second largest United States embassy building in the world.

In 2011, the United States Department of State announced plans to build a new United States embassy in the Nuevo Polanco neighborhood of Mexico City with an initial price of US$763 million. The complex was designed by Tod Williams Billie Tsien Architects and Davis Brody Bond. Construction of the new embassy complex began on February 13, 2018 and was expected to be completed in 2022. After construction delays, the new Chancery was completed in November 2025 at a cost of approximately US$943 million. It is currently the largest U.S. embassy in the world at 530,000 square feet of space.

== Embassy sections ==
The Embassy exercises a number of functions in its representation to the Government of Mexico, including political, administrative, economic, public diplomacy and consular affairs, that are managed under the Ambassador by counselors from the U.S. Department of State.

- Consular Section
  - American Citizen Services
  - Visa Services
- Economic Section
- Defense Attaché
- Public Affairs
- Political Section
- Management Section
- Other U.S. Government Agencies
  - American Battle Monuments Commission
  - Animal and Plant Health Inspection Service
  - Drug Enforcement Administration
  - Food and Drug Administration
  - Foreign Agricultural Service
  - Internal Revenue Service
  - Office of Foreign Assets Control
  - United States Commercial Service
  - United States Department of Defense
  - United States Department of Justice
  - U.S. Customs and Border Protection
  - U.S. Immigration and Customs Enforcement
  - United States Marshals Service
  - United States Peace Corps

== Consulates ==
The United States maintains consulates general in Ciudad Juárez, Guadalajara, Hermosillo, Matamoros, Mérida, Monterrey, Nogales, Nuevo Laredo and Tijuana and consular agencies in Acapulco, Los Cabos, Cancún, Mazatlán, Oaxaca City, Piedras Negras, Playa del Carmen, Puerto Vallarta and San Miguel de Allende.

== Gallery ==
Former U.S. Embassy in 1913

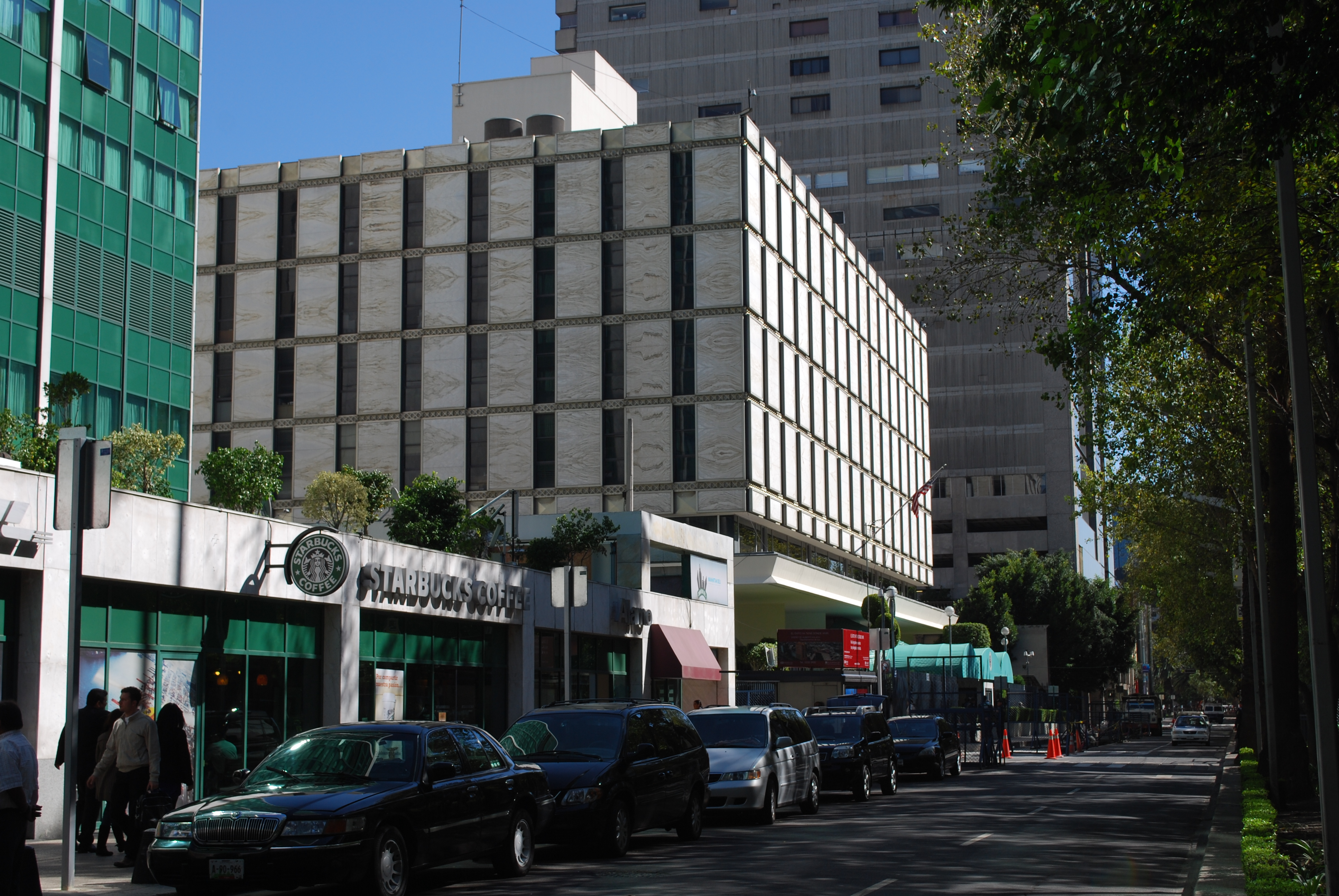
Former U.S. Embassy building on Reforma Avenue in 2010

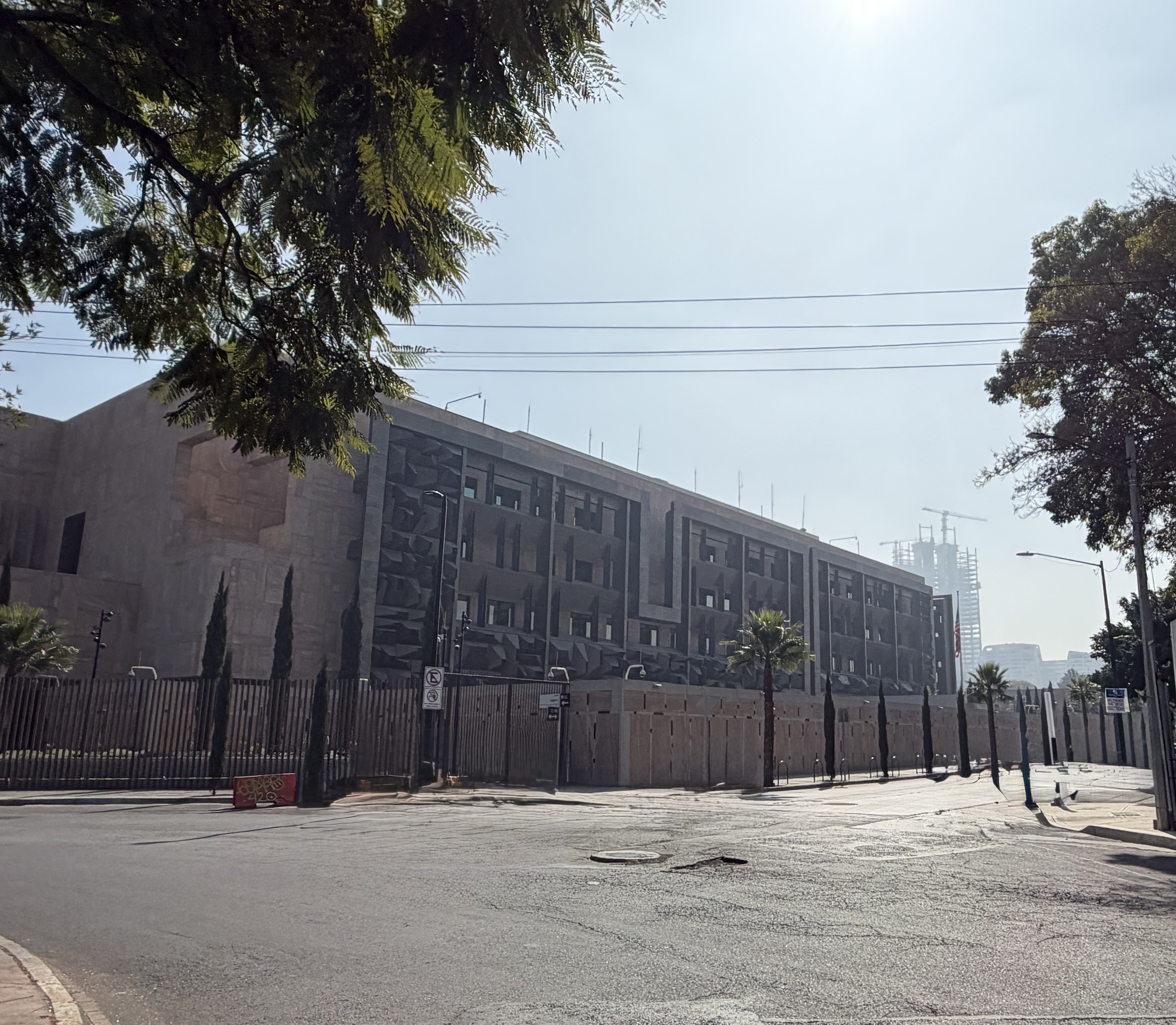
New U.S. Embassy building in 2025

== See also ==
- American immigration to Mexico
- Embassy of Mexico, Washington, D.C.
- Mexico–United States relations
