= 2011 Durango massacres =

Coordinates: 24°01′00″N 104°40′00″W

The massacres occurred near Durango, Mexico.

The 2011 Durango massacres were a series of mass murders that occurred in 2011. According to El Universal and Yahoo! News, at least 340 bodies have been found in mass graves around the city of Durango as of February 2012; These mass graves are the first of their kind in the state of Durango and third of their kind in Mexico. These mass graves had more bodies than the 2011 Tamaulipas massacre of 189 bus passengers. Since April 2011, there have been seven mass graves found around Durango. One of these mass graves was found in a vacant auto repair lot in Durango with 89 bodies. One of the bodies identified was Alfonso Peña, the former mayor of Tepehuanes, Durango.

== See also ==
- List of massacres in Mexico
- Nuevo León mass graves
- Coahuila mass graves
- 2010 San Fernando massacre
- 2011 San Fernando massacre
