= Juan Antonio Guajardo Anzaldúa =

Mexican politician (1958–2007)

Juan Antonio Guajardo
- Born: 30 November 1958; Reynosa, Tamaulipas, Mexico
- Died: 29 November 2007 (aged 48); Río Bravo, Tamaulipas, Mexico
- Occupation: Politician
- Political party: PT

Juan Antonio Guajardo Anzaldúa (30 November 1958 – 29 November 2007) was a Mexican politician. Through his life, he represented various political parties, although he was never affiliated with one. He served as Deputy of the 57th and 59th Legislatures of the Mexican Congress as a plurinominal representative and briefly served as Senator in 1994. He was also Mayor of Río Bravo, Tamaulipas from 1993 to 1995 and from 2002 to 2003.

On 29 November 2007, Guajardo and five companions were murdered in an ambush in Río Bravo.
