= Templo Cristiano Fe y Vida shooting =

Mass shooting in Mexico

- Chihuahua state in Mexico
- Location: Second floor, Templo Cristiano Fe y Vida (Christian Faith and Life Temple), Chihuahua, Mexico
- Date: 10 June 2010; 16 years ago
- Attack type: Mass shooting
- Deaths: 19
- Injuries: 4
- Perpetrator: At least 30 gunmen

On June 10, 2010, at least 19 people were killed in the Mexican state of Chihuahua in shooting attacks due to an ongoing drug war. The attack was on a drug rehabilitation clinic in the state capital Chihuahua. Four other people were wounded.

== Shootings ==
At least 30 gunmen pulled up in six trucks and entered the second floor of the Templo Cristiano Fe y Vida (Christian Faith and Life Temple). They told anyone who asked that they were from the police before proceeding to fire at people they encountered, including staff and patients. The victims were lined up and then executed by the gunmen. The killed patients were between the ages of 18 and 25.

== Perpetrators and motive ==
The perpetrators fled on foot. They are unknown, but are thought to be members of a cartel in search of revenge.

According to a Chihuahuan police spokesman, the attackers described those whom they attacked as "criminals" and left messages for them expressing this.

== Response ==
President of Mexico Felipe Calderón issued his condemnation from South Africa, where he was attending the Mexico national football team's opening game of the 2010 FIFA World Cup. He described such attacks as "outrageous acts that reinforce the need to fight with the full force of the law criminal groups carrying out such barbarism".
