= Villa Unión, Coahuila =

City in the Mexican state of Coahuila

Villa Unión
- Municipal seat and city
- Location in Mexico
- Coordinates: 28°13′N 100°43′W
- Country: Mexico
- State: Coahuila
- Municipality: Villa Unión

Villa Unión is a city and seat of the municipality of Villa Unión, in the north-eastern Mexican state of Coahuila.
