= Coahuila mass graves =

Gravesite in Mexico

The Coahuila mass graves was the mass murder of 38 people near the city of Piedras Negras, Coahuila, Mexico, on 3 June 2011. The three clandestine mass graves where the bodies were exhumed were found by the Mexican military and authorized personnel after an anonymous call notified them of the location where the decaying bodies were. The investigators found buttons, shirts, coins, and watches. The mass graves were purposely covered with soil and grass to simulate a pasture. All of the bodies were burned to death.

== See also ==
- List of massacres in Mexico
- Mexican drug war
- 2011 San Fernando massacre
- 2011 Durango massacres
- Nuevo León mass graves
