= 2011 San Fernando massacre =

Mass murder in San Fernando

- Part of the Mexican drug war
- 2011 San Fernando massacre (Tamaulipas) 2011 San Fernando massacre (Mexico)
- Location: 24°50′N 98°09′W; San Fernando, Tamaulipas, Mexico
- Date: 24–29 March 2011
- Target: Civilians and Gulf Cartel hitmen
- Attack type: Mass murder, kidnapping
- Deaths: 193
- Perpetrator: Los Zetas

The 2011 San Fernando massacre, also known as the second massacre of San Fernando, was the mass murder of 193 people by Los Zetas drug cartel at La Joya ranch in the municipality of San Fernando, Tamaulipas, Mexico, in March 2011. Authorities investigating the massacre reported numerous hijackings of passenger buses on Mexican Federal Highway 101 in San Fernando, and the kidnapped victims were later killed and buried in 47 clandestine mass graves. The investigations began immediately after several suitcases and other baggage went unclaimed in Reynosa and Matamoros, Tamaulipas. On 6 April 2011, Mexican authorities exhumed 59 corpses from eight mass graves. By 7 June 2011, after a series of multiple excavations, a total of 193 bodies were exhumed from mass graves in San Fernando.

Reports mentioned that female kidnapping victims were raped and able-bodied male kidnapping victims were forced to fight to the death with other hostages, where they were given knives, hammers, machetes and clubs to find recruits who were willing to kill for their lives. In the blood sport, the survivor was recruited as a hitman for Los Zetas; those who did not survive were buried in a clandestine gravesite. After the massacre, thousands of citizens from San Fernando fled to other parts of Mexico and to the US. The Mexican government responded by sending 650 soldiers to San Fernando and establishing a military base in the municipality. The troops took over the duties of the police force in the city and worked on social programs. In addition, a total of 82 Zeta members were arrested by 23 August 2011. In 2012 tranquility slowly returned to the city, along with the inhabitants who fled because of the violence.

Mexican authorities are not certain why Los Zetas decided to abduct people from buses, and then torture, murder and bury them. They speculate that the Zetas may have forcibly recruited the passengers as foot soldiers for the organization, intending to hold them for ransom or extort them before they crossed into the US. Some killers, however, confessed that they abducted and killed the passengers because they feared their rivals, the Gulf Cartel, were getting reinforcements from other states. One of the leaders confessed that Heriberto Lazcano, the supreme leader of Los Zetas, had ordered the investigation of all buses coming in through San Fernando; those "who had nothing to do with it were freed. But those that did, they were killed." In addition, the killers claimed to have investigated passengers' cellphones and text messages to determine if they were involved with the Gulf Cartel or not, and that they were particularly worried about buses coming in from the states of Durango and Michoacán, two strongholds of the rival La Familia and the Sinaloa Cartels.

== Background ==
In early 2010, Los Zetas broke apart from the Gulf Cartel and both organizations turned their weapons against each other. The first clash between the groups happened in Reynosa, then expanded to Nuevo Laredo and Matamoros. The war spread throughout 11 of Tamaulipas' municipalities, 9 of which border Texas, and soon thereafter spread to Tamaulipas' neighboring states: Nuevo León and Veracruz. In the midst of violence and panic, authorities and media initially attempted to downplay the situation.

In San Fernando, Gulf Cartel forces led by Antonio Cárdenas Guillén "strung the bodies of fallen Zetas and their associates from light poles." The Gulf Cartel lashed out to attack Los Zetas at their stronghold in San Fernando. According to The Monitor, the municipality of San Fernando is a "virtual spiderweb" of dirt roads that connect with Monterrey, Nuevo Laredo, Reynosa, and Matamoros—making it a prized territory for drug traffickers.

In August 2010, Mexican Naval Infantry found 72 dead immigrants—58 men and 14 women—in San Fernando, killed by Los Zetas for their failure to pay their ransom and their refusal to work for the cartel. An Ecuadorian survivor faked his death and made it up to a military checkpoint, and subsequently led authorities to the 72 dead inside a warehouse on a ranch. The massacre was internationally condemned.

== Massacre ==
Between 24 and 29 March 2011, several public transportation buses that were heading to Reynosa, Tamaulipas, were hijacked in San Fernando.

On 6 April 2011 Mexican authorities found 59 bodies in eight clandestine mass graves in San Fernando, Tamaulipas. This discovery led officials to acknowledge that the Mexican drug cartels had begun to inflict fear through a new modus operandi: "stopping buses and removing passengers, some never to be seen again." Two weeks before the bodies were found, there were reports of buses being hijacked by the cartels near San Fernando, where cartel members would "stop the bus, select passengers, take them hostage." Fourteen cartel members were arrested too. By 8 April 2011, the secretary general of Tamaulipas, Morelos Jaime Canseco, confirmed the finding of 13 more bodies, increasing the body count to 72. When the death toll reached 72, bus lines in Tamaulipas refused to take people to San Fernando until the situation was resolved. Investigators began to mention that those killed were not migrants (like the previous massacre of the 72 migrants in 2010), but "fellow Mexican citizens".

On 10 April 2011, in four other mass graves, 16 more bodies were exhumed, increasing the death toll to 88. Witnesses then reported that cartel members had stopped the bus at a fake military checkpoint, and that they had ordered the passengers to "pay up to $300 US dollars" for them to continue on their route. The investigation continued, and on 12 April 2011 the Mexican military confirmed the finding of 28 more bodies, upping the death toll to 116 and the mass graves up to 15. It was then proven by the PGR that the massacre was carried out by Los Zetas, a drug trafficking organization formed originally by former military soldiers in Mexico. By 13 April the authorities found six more bodies, making the death toll 122. The next day, on 14 April, 12 more mass graves were found with 23 bodies, and the body count reached 145. Investigators mentioned that the bodies had been deceased for between "one and two months". Also, 16 police officers from San Fernando were arrested for allegedly serving as accomplices to members of Los Zetas in the slayings.

On 21 April 2011 authorities found 32 more bodies in eight other mass graves; the death toll went up to 177. Five days later, on 26 April, the body count reached 183, and the mass graves found now numbered over 40. Seventy-four suspected killers had been captured too. By this date only two of the 183 bodies found had been "fully identified" by authorities, and around 120 bodies were sent to Mexico City for identification. Finally, on 7 June 2011, the bodies found in clandestine mass graves in the municipality of San Fernando, Tamaulipas, stopped at 193 corpses. One US citizen was killed in the massacre.

=== Gladiator-like killings ===
Houston Chronicle journalist Dane Schiller interviewed an alleged cartel member, who explained Los Zetas had been using an "ancient Roman gladiator blood sport" to groom new assassins and to find recruits for their organization.

The kidnapped victims were forced to fight to the death with other victims. Men were given knives, hammers and machetes, and were ordered at gunpoint to fight for their lives like a "gladiator-style contest". The winners were ordered to go on suicide missions and shoot at rival drug cartel members elsewhere. The dead were buried in mass graves. Almost all the corpses found in the mass graves had evidence of "blunt force trauma".

A cartel member on trial in Laredo, Texas, testified that the fighting contests between the kidnapped victims were ordered by Miguel Treviño Morales, a high-ranking Zeta lieutenant, and that they were used to make the killers "lose their fear." In addition, he mentioned that 100 Zeta recruits were being trained in Ciudad Victoria, and 300 more in San Fernando in January 2012.

=== Federal Highway 101 ===
Mexican Federal Highway 101, which extends from the border city of Matamoros, to the capital of the state, Ciudad Victoria, is known by local residents as the "Highway of Death". Those who traveled through this highway in 2010 and 2011 used to see "burned vehicles, bullet-shot trucks on the side of the road, and dead bodies, often decapitated, that the cartels would leave behind."

Others who have traveled through this highway and have survived car hijackings and checkpoints the organized crime groups have installed from Padilla to San Fernando have reported what happens on the highway. A survivor saw "four SUVs, all grey and with tinted windows," adding that "everyone was armed."

The violence and constant car hijackings were so bad that bus lines avoided Highway 101 by driving out of their way. Another survivor stated that heavily armed men would stop buses at roadblocks, and then force women and young girls at gunpoint, "strip them naked, rape them," and then drive away in trucks, leaving the passengers traumatized. One bus driver, "who said he had avoided being stopped thus far," claimed that another bus driver at the station had said that 12 people were pulled off the bus just 30 minutes before him. Other witnesses claim that once the buses were stopped, gunmen would storm the bus and point at certain passengers and say "you, you're coming down," and take them at gunpoint. The buses were then ordered to leave.

Highway 101 is the biggest and most important transportation system in the state of Tamaulipas, and it connects the state with Matamoros and Texas with the rest of Tamaulipas. Local residents mention that there is only traffic on this highway during daylight. As of 2012, they mention that the cartels "still kill people in San Fernando." The US has issued travel warnings south of the border.

=== Unconfirmed higher death toll ===
On 17 June 2011, federal police captured Édgar Huerta Montiel, a high-ranking boss in Los Zetas and the man responsible for the killing of 72 migrants in 2010. He confessed during interrogation that "more than 600 bodies" were buried in clandestine mass graves near San Fernando, unconfirmed by Mexican authorities. Isabel Miranda de Wallace of "Stop the Kidnappings" suspects that the mass graves in San Fernando contain more than 500 dead, but that the government of Tamaulipas has not released such information because of the political troubles it may instigate.

== Aftermath ==
=== Arrests ===
On 17 April 2011, in the capital city of Ciudad Victoria, Mexican authorities captured Martín Omar Estrada Luna, alias El Kilo, lieutenant boss of Los Zetas in San Fernando, Tamaulipas, and responsible for at least 217 killings in that locality. Along with El Kilo, 11 additional Zeta gunmen were apprehended. They were linked to the killing of a policeman and an investigator who were covering the massacres. In addition, Estrada Luna was one of the masterminds of the massacre of the 72 migrants and of the mass graves found. He was regarded by the DEA as "one of the most aggressive leaders in Los Zetas organization." On 17 June 2011 in Fresnillo, Zacatecas, the Federal Police captured Édgar Huerta Montiel, alias El Wache, a high-ranking lieutenant of Los Zetas and the man responsible for the killings of the 72 immigrants. Huerta Montiel was an army deserter before joining Los Zetas. Other Zeta lieutenants, like Abraham Barrios Caporal, alias El Erasmo, were captured on 30 June 2011.

The PGR offered up to 15 million pesos for information leading to the capture of those responsible. In addition, the PGR led the investigation and as of August 2011, 82 people had been arrested. Some of those arrested were minors under the age of 18. Top-Zeta leaders responsible for the attacks have also been arrested: Salvador Alfonso Martínez Escobedo, alias La Ardilla, was captured in late 2012 and Miguel Treviño Morales, Commander 40, was arrested on 15 July 2013. One Zeta leader accused of involvement was still on the run as of July 2013: Román Ricardo Palomo Rincones, alias El Coyote.

On 21 August 2024, 11 gunmen working for Los Zetas were convicted and sentenced to up to 50 years' imprisonment for their role in the massacre.

=== Police implications ===
Marisela Morales, the Attorney General of Mexico, mentioned in a communiqué on 13 April 2011 that 16 of those arrested were municipal police officers in San Fernando. According to the investigations, the policemen offered Los Zetas "protection and help[ed] them cover up the killings." The president of Mexico, Felipe Calderón, criticized the governors of the Mexican states for failing to certify and regulate their police forces, who often aid criminal groups in their activities. Calderón condemned the fact that policemen kidnap civilians and then take them in their own police vehicles to the place where they are to be killed. The President then mentioned that although the government at a federal level is working to "clean up" the police forces, at state and municipal levels the improvements "have not been parallel." A judge ordered the imprisonment of all police officers implicated in the massacre on 18 April 2011.

=== Exodus in San Fernando ===
After the massacre of the 72 migrants, the discovery of the mass graves and the continuing violence between the Gulf Cartel and Los Zetas, fear so overwhelmed the citizens of San Fernando that more than 10,000 of them left the city. The city's mayor, Tomás Gloria Requena, estimates that "around 10% of the population" left to "other towns and cities in Tamaulipas, and possibly to other parts of Mexico and the United States." A priest of San Fernando, however, noted that those who left the city were directly "threaten[ed] by the organized crime groups," and that the arrival of the military has brought some of the tranquility the inhabitants of San Fernando wanted. The priest related that when he drove around the city to go to other parishes, "heavily armed men with ski-masks ordered [him] to stop and identify [himself]." They would let him go after he said he was a priest at a local church, but mentioned that "these risks happened to the whole population."

Newspapers mention that San Fernando, Tamaulipas, "stayed without policemen," and the ones who were from that municipality were either arrested or assigned different functions. The government of Tamaulipas believes that the "exodus of the citizens of San Fernando is transitory, and once order is re-established, the families will be back again." On 1 January 2012 the SEDENA thanked the soldiers in San Fernando for bringing order and for "reverting the exodus of San Fernando, an unfortunate phenomenon that occurred due to the violence and the criminal groups that operated in the region."

=== Military-led responses and new base ===
In May 2011 the federal government sent more than 500 troops to Tamaulipas to combat the drug cartels in the area and work together with the state forces. In addition, retired soldiers were also called to voluntarily join in the fight against the organized crime groups. A military base was established in the municipality of San Fernando on 18 January 2012. The headquarters were inaugurated by Egidio Torre Cantú, then governor of Tamaulipas. The base hosts more than 650 military personnel. Below is the welcoming speech Torre Cantú gave to the soldiers on their arrival at Tamaulipas:

You all come here today to collaborate with the people of Tamaulipas, to show your love for this country and your call for service, and to participate in the establishment of law to bring tranquility to the citizens of this state.

— Egidio Torre Cantú, governor of the state of Tamaulipas

On another note, the troops also worked on "social projects" throughout San Fernando; they provided medical care to the citizens, helped in the infrastructure of the city, provided free haircuts, helped repaint buildings and picked up trash. In November 2011 the military took over the responsibilities of the police in San Fernando, and now patrols the city, answers emergency calls of civilians, mans military checkpoints on highways, guards the municipal palace, investigates passenger buses and cars for drugs and other illegal goods and directs traffic.

In addition, another military base was opened in the city of Ciudad Mier, Tamaulipas.

=== San Fernando after the massacres ===
Little by little the people who left San Fernando, Tamaulipas are slowly coming back to the city. However, the citizens still find themselves "scared", and they reportedly "mistrust foreigners." With the arrival of Mexican federal troops and the creation of the military base, San Fernando's social fabric and normality have been recovering. In the city square, one can now see "a pair of lovers, bootblacks at work, people walking in the streets, and kids having fun." Candy stores, restaurants, shoe stores, and other establishments have reopened.

As of 2012 life in San Fernando appears to be calm, but once nightfall comes around, people are no longer in the streets. After 10:00 p.m. "San Fernando is a ghost town." The last bus departure from Ciudad Victoria or Matamoros to San Fernando is at 6:10 p.m.; before the violence, buses drove to San Fernando throughout the night. Taxi drivers used to wait for people arriving at San Fernando throughout all hours of the night, and now the last bus arrives at around 9:30 p.m., and everyone then closes their doors and goes home. In 2012 it had been more than three years since the city of San Fernando had a carnival dance; the Ramón Ayala pub used to be the get-together place every weekend, and now it is closed. Other bars have also closed too, as well as the cinemas. According to Alberto Torres from El Universal, the people of San Fernando are resentful toward the government, from the federal level to the state and local ones. For more than two years "they were abandoned and forgotten, left at their own luck, in the middle of a raging drug war." A resident recalls what he feels when people from other parts of Mexico hear he's from San Fernando:

You have no idea what it feels to go to a different place and say 'I am from San Fernando' and be discriminated.

In addition, although the highways and dirt roads in Tamaulipas are sometimes the scenes of armed confrontations, as of February 2012 there have been "advancements" in the security situation of highways in the state. The PGR has not identified 159 of the 193 corpses exhumed as of April 2012.

== Controversy ==
=== Tamaulipas as a failed state ===
The massacre of the 72 migrants, the mass graves with nearly 200 bodies, the assassination of the PRI candidate for state governor, Rodolfo Torre Cantú, the murder of two city mayors, the numerous prison breaks and killings, the escalating violence in Tamaulipas and the lack of media coverage, along with the political and police corruption, have brought analysts to conclude that Tamaulipas may in fact be or become a failed state.

Manuel Suárez-Mier, economist and drug war expert, believes that Mexico and Tamaulipas are "not failed states," since their economies are projected to grow starting in 2010, and the security measures stand in "a phase of reconstruction."

== See also ==
- List of massacres in Mexico
  - 2011 Durango massacres
  - 2011–2012 in the Mexican Drug War
  - Coahuila mass graves
  - Nuevo León mass graves
