= 2020 in Mexico =

- Decades: 2000s; 2010s; 2020s
- See also: History of Mexico; List of years in Mexico; Timeline of Mexican history

This article lists events occurring in Mexico during 2020.

== Incumbents ==
=== President and cabinet ===
- President: Andres Manuel López Obrador, National Regeneration Movement MORENA
- Interior: Olga Sánchez Cordero
- Foreign Affairs: Marcelo Ebrard
- Treasury: Arturo Herrera
- Economy: Graciela Márquez Colín
- Energy: Norma Rocío Nahle García
- Agriculture: Víctor Villalobos
- Labor: Luisa María Alcalde Luján
- Education: Esteban Moctezuma
- Communications:
  - Javier Jiménez Espriú, until July 23
  - Jorge Arganis Díaz Leal, starting July 23, 2020
- Environment:
  - Víctor Manuel Toledo, until September 2
  - Maria Luisa Albores, starting September 2
- Tourism: Miguel Torruco Marqués
- Civil Service: Irma Sandoval-Ballesteros
- Health: Jorge Alcocer Varela
- Development: Román Guillermo Meyer
- Welfare:
  - María Luisa Albores, until September 2
  - Javier May Rodríguez, starting September 2
- Culture: Alejandra Frausto Guerrero
- Defense: Luis Cresencio Sandoval
- Navy: José Rafael Ojeda Durán
- Security: Alfonso Durazo Montaño
- Attorney General: Alejandro Gertz Manero

=== Supreme Court ===
- President of the Supreme Court: Arturo Zaldívar Lelo de Larrea (since January 2, 2019)

=== Governors ===
- Aguascalientes: Martín Orozco Sandoval PAN
- Baja California: Jaime Bonilla MORENA (Note: The Supreme Court of Justice of the Nation held that the so-called Ley Bonilla was unconstitutional, meaning Bonilla's term would end in 2021.)
- Baja California Sur: Carlos Mendoza Davis PAN
- Campeche: Carlos Miguel Aysa González acting governor PRI
- Chiapas: Rutilio Escandón MORENA
- Chihuahua: Javier Corral Jurado PAN
- Coahuila: Miguel Ángel Riquelme Solís PRI
- Colima: José Ignacio Peralta PRI
- Durango: José Rosas Aispuro PAN
- Guanajuato: Diego Sinhué Rodríguez Vallejo PAN
- Guerrero: Héctor Astudillo Flores PRI
- Hidalgo: Omar Fayad PRI
- Jalisco: Enrique Alfaro Ramírez MC
- Mexico City: Claudia Sheinbaum MORENA
- Mexico (state): Alfredo del Mazo Maza PRI
- Michoacán: Silvano Aureoles Conejo PRD
- Morelos: Cuauhtémoc Blanco PES
- Nayarit: Antonio Echevarría García PAN
- Nuevo León: Jaime Rodríguez Calderón, Independent
- Oaxaca: Alejandro Murat Hinojosa PRI
- Puebla: Miguel Barbosa Huerta MORENA
- Querétaro: Francisco Domínguez Servién PAN
- Quintana Roo: Carlos Joaquín González PRD
- San Luis Potosí: Juan Manuel Carreras PRI
- Sinaloa: Quirino Ordaz Coppel PRI
- Sonora: Claudia Pavlovich Arellano PRI
- Tabasco: Adán Augusto López Hernández MORENA
- Tamaulipas: Francisco Javier García Cabeza de Vaca PAN
- Tlaxcala: Marco Antonio Mena Rodríguez PRI
- Veracruz: Cuitláhuac García Jiménez MORENA
- Yucatán: Mauricio Vila Dosal PAN
- Zacatecas: Alejandro Tello Cristerna PRI

=== LXIV Legislature of the Mexican Congress ===
==== President of the Senate ====
Mónica Fernández Balboa MORENA, starting September 1, 2019

==== President of the Chamber of Deputies ====
- Laura Angélica Rojas Hernández PAN, until September 1
- Dulce María Sauri Riancho PRI, starting September 1

== Monthly events ==
=== January ===
- January 1
  - Tax changes designed to increase income for the Office for the Treasury and Public Credit (SHCP) take effect.
  - The minimum wage increases 20%, from MXN $102.68 to $123.22 (US$6.53) daily. This is still lower than in Brazil and Colombia, where per capita income is similar.
- January 2
  - Reuters reports that Mexican citizens who seek asylum in the United States will be sent to Guatemala.
  - The first femicide of the year is reported in Aquismón, San Luis Potosí.
  - A second riot at the prison in Cieneguillas, Zacatecas leaves one dead in addition to the 16 inmates who were killed on December 31, 2019.
- January 3
  - Mexico names Edmundo Font new interim Chargé d'affaires for Bolivia.
  - President Andrés Manuel López Obrador (AMLO) requests the liberation of Julian Assange.
- January 4 – An earthquake with a magnitude 5.9M_{w} and an epicenter in Unión Hidalgo, Oaxaca was felt in at least states: Oaxaca, Chiapas, Tabasco, Veracruz, Puebla, Morelos, State of Mexico, and Mexico City. No damage is reported.
- January 5 – 26: Mérida Fest 2020, Mérida, Yucatán
- January 6
  - President López Obrador announces that construction of 1,350 branches of the Banco de Bienestar ("Social Assistance Bank") has begun.
  - Internet for All, part of the Federal Electricity Commission (CFE), begins operations with a proposed budget of MXN $3 billion (US$159 million) in 2020 and a planned completion date of 2022.
  - Margarita Ríos-Farjat becomes a member of the Supreme Court of Justice of the Nation (SCJN).
- January 7
  - The Office for the Treasury and Public Credit (SCHP) sells bonds worth US$2.3 billion.
  - At least seven people are killed and 35 injured when a train and a bus crash in Vícam, Guaymas, Sonora.
- January 8
  - Arias Consultores releases a poll that describes the best and worst governors. Sinaloa governor Quirino Ordaz Coppel is chosen best, while Puebla governor L. Miguel Barbosa Huerta is declared the worst.
  - Mexico becomes president pro tempore of the Community of Latin American and Caribbean States.
- January 9
  - Popocateptl volcano emits 3 km of smoke. On January 7 and 8, the volcano emitted 155 exhalations, 198 minutes of shaking, and three earthquakes.
  - AMLO promises that obesity will be combatted by a nutrition campaign, not through new taxes.
- January 10
  - A teacher is killed and four people are wounded in the Colegio Cervantes shooting in Torreón, Coahuila. The eleven-year-old shooter committed suicide.
  - A 21-year-old man is arrested and charged with terrorism for using pepper spray in several stores in Monterrey, Nuevo León.
- January 10 – February 4: Leon State Fair, León, Guanajuato
- January 11
  - The National Institute of Anthropology and History (INAH) requests the Attorney General (FGR) to sue to prohibit an auction of 28 Mexican archaeological treasures by French auctioneer "Millon de París" on January 22. The Secretariat of Foreign Affairs (SRE) also plans to ask the French government to intervene.
  - Governor Enrique Alfaro Ramírez says Jalisco will not participate in the Instituto de Salud para el Bienestar (Insabi) (Institute of Health for Welfare).
  - Activists place hundreds of red shoes in Mexico City's Zócalo to protest the murders of an average ten women and girls daily; fewer than 10% are resolved.
  - Mexico City imposes a ban on plastic bags.
- January 12 – President Lopez Obrador meets with members of the LeBaron family in Bavispe, Sonora. AMLO promises to erect a monument in La Mora, Sonora in honor of the nine family members killed. Protesters accused Julián LeBarón of stealing land and water.
- January 13
  - Secretary of Education (SEP) Esteban Moctezuma proposes a new scheme for Operativo Mochilla (Operation backpack) wherein parents will be responsible for revising the backpacks of children and staff at schools so as to prevent the entry of guns and other contraband.
  - Governor Cuauhtémoc Blanco of Morelos says that at least 180 police officers are being investigated for ties to organized crime and drug trafficking.
  - China announces that two of its banks will lend US$600 million for the construction of the Dos Bocas refinery in Paraíso, Tabasco. Energy Secretary Rocío Nahle makes it clear that the refinery will be built with public funds, but that contractors may borrow money from China or other countries.
- January 14
  - Despite confessing to abusing several minors, Fernando Martínez Suárez will remain a member of the Legion of Christ but he will not perform priestly duties.
  - The presidential airplane has been returned to Mexico after the government tried to sell it in the United States for a year at a cost of US$1.5 million in maintenance. It may be rented out or bartered for needed goods. 19 other planes and nine helicopters will be auctioned off, with the hopes of raising US$1 billion.
  - The Supreme Court rules that National Institute of Statistics and Geography (INEGI) can ignore the ban against paying its executives more than the President of Mexico.
- January 16
  - Two earthquakes of 5.3M_{w} and 4.9M_{w} respectively, hit at least five municipalities in the Isthmus of Tehuantepec in Oaxaca. Slight damages but no injuries are reported. There have been 679 earthquakes in Oaxaca this year.
  - U.S. Attorney General William Barr visits Mexico to discuss money laundering, arms trafficking, and drug trafficking.
  - A commando consisting of 150 men armed with assault rifles burn 22 homes and seven vehicles and kidnap five people in two towns in Madera Municipality, Chihuahua.
- January 17
  - AMLO offers 4,000 jobs to Central American immigrants.
  - Secretariat of the Interior (SEGOB) announces it will build a memorial for the 137 victims of the 2019 pipeline explosion in Tlahuelilpan, Hidalgo. Each family was compensated with MXN $15,000 (US$800).
- January 18
  - The office of the attorney general of Oaxaca reports that investigation into the acid-attack on saxophonist María Elena Ríos Ortiz has finished. Governor Alejandro Murat says there is an arrest warrant for former deputy Juan Vera Carrizal.
  - Mexico stops thousands of Honduran immigrants on the border with Guatemala.
- January 19
  - Between 1,500 and 2,000 undocumented immigrants from Honduras try to cross the Suchiate River in Chiapas, but are stopped by the National Guard. Groups of 20 or 30 were allowed to try to regularize their immigration status and obtain employment.
  - 1,000 supporters of "Reforestación Extrema" (Extreme reforestation) demonstrate in La Huasteca-Nuevo León.
  - The fire at the Cuemanco Plant Market in Xochimilco, Mexico City, is the fifth market fire in a month.
- January 20
  - Thousands of Honduran migrants and asylum-seekers battle with Mexican National Guard and try to force their way across the Suchiate River.
  - Isatech technology of Monterrey offers to pay US$130 million for the presidential plane to use it for commercial purposes and to make it available to the Ministry of Foreign Affairs.
  - 22,923 police officers and 2,375 vehicles participate in Mexico City's first Macrosimulacro (Macro earthquake drill).
  - New data show that homicides in Mexico in 2019 reached a record level.
- January 21
  - A popular poll by U.S. News & World Report places Mexico as the second most corrupt country in the world; Colombia is number one.
  - Eighteen states have signed up for the new health care program, Insabi.
- January 22
  - Airports in Mexico City, Monterrey, and Cancun, where flights arrive directly from China, are on alert for Coronavirus disease 2019.
  - Nineteen children between six and fifteen march as community police by the Coordinadora Regional de Autoridades Comunitarias-Pueblos Fundadores (CRAC-PF) in Chilapa de Álvarez, Guerrero. Those over 12 have been issued .22 caliber rifles while younger ones carry sticks.
- January 24
  - Tijuana International Airport joins other airports on alert against the coronavirus from China.
  - Dulce Susana Jacobo Cruz, a student at the Escuela Nacional de Antropología e Historia (ENAH), complains of racist comments and torture of children when she and a group of migrants were detained by authorities at the Estación Migratoria (Migrant Station) of Ciudad Industrial, Villahermosa, Tabasco.
  - Parents of children with cancer protest for the third day in a row because of a lack of medicine.
  - In Guerrero, officials announce that children as young as 14 have been recruited to assist local police in local law enforcement efforts. About 20 children have been recruited for an indigenous community police force in western Mexico following a deadly attack blamed on a drug cartel. Some of the children, aged between eight and 14, were handed rifles while others paraded with sticks on a road in the town of Chilapa in Guerrero state.
  - Calm returns to the Mexico-Guatemala border after 800 Honduran immigrants were arrested on January 23.
- January 26 – The Comisión Nacional de los Derechos Humanos (National Human Rights Commission) reports that 2019 saw 35% more complaints about a lack of medicine and negligence than in 2018.
- January 27
  - Twelve governors, all member of PRI, agree to support Insabi.
  - At least sixty are killed in violence over the weekend of January 24–26 in the state of Guanajuato.
  - The Supreme Court (SCJN) declares that it is unconstitutional to require a Carta de No-Antecedentes Penales (letter that certifies no criminal record) as a prerequisite for employment.
- January 28 – Judge Francisco Castillo González orders a MXN $10 million (US$534,000) lien against journalist Sergio Aguayo and his property for "moral damage" of former Coahuila governor Humberto Moreira (PRI) in an editorial Aguayo wrote for Reforma in 2016. Journalists and human rights activists unite in solidarity with Aguayo.
- January 29 – Three notorious criminals, one in the process of being extradited to the United States, escape from the Reclusorio Sur (South Penitentiary) in Mexico City.
- January 30
  - INEGI reports that the Mexican economy contracted by 0.1% in 2019 after growth of just over 2% in 2018.
  - Naela Berenice Razo López, an engineering physics graduate of the Autonomous University of Queretaro wins the John Bacall Physics Prize from Princeton University and will spend the summer semester at the Niels Bohr Institute in Denmark.
  - Seven municipal police officers, including the chief of police, are arrested for a November 2019 murder in Cuitzeo, Michoacan.

=== February ===
- February 1
  - AMLO says his administration has rescued Pemex from bankruptcy and discusses other energy issues while in Merida, Yucatan.
  - A Chinese tourist who passed through Mexico City is confirmed to be infected with Coronavirus disease 2019. Nine cases of possible infection are being monitored, but as of today, there are no confirmed cases in Mexico.
  - The Sinaloa Cartel guards the Culiacán Cathedral in Sinaloa as the daughter of Joaquín "El Chapo" Guzmán marries the nephew of Margarita Cázares, la "Emperatriz del Narco". Only members of the cartel are allowed to attend.
- February 2 – Candlemas The National Museum of Popular Cultures in Coyoacán reports that a record-breaking 126,000 attended the 27th Feria del Tamal (Tamales fair) in one week.
- February 3
  - Constitution Day (Statutory holiday)
  - At least eight people including one minor are killed in a shooting at a video-arcade in Uruapan, Michoacan. The unrest seems to be related to the arrest on January 31 of Luis Felipe Barragán (El Vocho), the presumed leader of Los Viagra.
- February 4 – The National data protection authority (Spanish: Instituto Nacional de Transparencia, Acceso a la Información y Protección de Datos Personales) (Inai) orders the Ministry of Health to publicize all information about the cost and available of cancer medicine.
- February 5
  - Farmers in Chihuahua fight with the National Guard over water payments to the United States. Earlier this week farmers in Ojinaga Municipality broke open locks on a dam.
  - AMLO says he wants to eliminate puentes (English: three-day weekends) in the academic calendar beginning July 2020 so that children will learn and appreciate the historic importance of holidays.
  - Fifteen schools and colleges of the UNAM are now on strike in protest of violence against women.
- February 5 to 9 – Contemporary Art Week at four locations in Mexico City Art critic Avelina Lésper destroyed Gabriel Rico's Nimble and sinister tricks (to be preserved without scandal and corruption), worth US$20,000, with a can of soda pop. The fair in "Zona Macro" is considered the most important contemporary art fair in Latin America.
- February 6
  - Activists from Mexico join their African counterparts to support the International Day of Zero Tolerance for Female Genital Mutilation (FGM).
  - In a visit to the Mexican Senate, the President of Guatemala, Alejandro Giammattei suggests the two countries construct Muros de Prosperidad ("Prosperity Walls") in the form of an investment bank in the Mexican states of Chiapas and Tabasco and the Guatemalan departments of San Marcos, Quiché, and Huehuetenango to stem migration.
  - Russian Foreign Minister Sergey Lavrov says that Russia is in talks to sell military helicopters to Mexico. Hugo Rodriguez of the United States Department of State says that Mexico could be subject to sanctions if the sale goes forward.
- February 9 – Strikes in five schools and colleges of the National Autonomous University of Mexico (UNAM) that were taken over to protest sexual harassment and violence have been returned to university authorities. Others continue in the hands of protesters, and an interuniversity assembly has been convoked for February 10.
- February 10 – The Attorney General of Mexico (FGR) promises that the law against femicide will not disappear, but that the laws must be reformed to protect women and children. He notes that homicides have increased by 35% in the last five years, but femicides (Spanish: feminicidios) have increased by 137% in the same period of time.
- February 11 – The diffusion on social media of graphic photographs of the dismembered cadaver of Ingrid Escamilla, victim of a brutal femicide, disturbs the nation. The Ministry of Home Affairs (SEGOB) promises an investigation. The sighting is later confirmed by the National Civil Protection Coordination, stating that no damage was reported.
- February 12
  - Former head of Pemex Emilio Lozoya Austin is arrested in Málaga, Spain.
  - At a supper for the 200 most important business leaders in the country, guests were pressured to commit to buying blocks of raffle tickets for the Presidential airplane.
- February 12–16: San Miguel Writers' Conference & Literary Festival, San Miguel de Allende, Guanajuato
  - The Banco de México (Bank of Mexico) cuts interest rates for the fifth time in a year.
- February 14 – Family members of victims of violence against women and feminists protest the President's silence on the issue by painting the walls and doors of the National Palace. AMLO responds "No soy un presidente surgido de la élite, insensible, simulador. Estamos haciendo todo lo que nos corresponde, y se va seguir informando y deseo con toda mi alma de que se reduzca la violencia y que no se agreda a las mujeres, eso es lo que deseo." ("I am not a president emerged from the elite, insensitive, simulator. We are doing everything that we must, and I will continue to inform and I wish with all my soul that violence is reduced and that women are not added; that is what I want.")
- February 15
  - Thousands protest against femicide in Mexico City and other parts of the country. The naked body of an unidentified girl between 10 and 14 is found in a plastic garbage bag wrapped in a sack in Tláhuac, Mexico City.
  - The government of Jalisco launches an investigation into the source of heavy metals and other pollutants in the Grande de Santiago River, which feeds the once-spectacular Juanacatlán Falls.
- February 16 – Ten Mexicans who were evacuated from China to Paris due to the COVID-19 pandemic return to Mexico after a 14-day quarantine in which they tested negative.
- February 18
  - Claudia Sheinbaum announces that the search for missing children will begin as soon as they are reported missing, instead of waiting for an official police complaint. The Autoridad Federal Educativa de la Ciudad de México (Federal Educational Authority of Mexico City) explains that if a child is not picked up by a parent or guardian within twenty minutes of school closing time, the child should be taken to the local police.
  - Reforms against sexual harassment go into force at the UNAM.
  - The Mexican government will resume the search for 63 bodies lost in the 2006 Pasta de Conchos mine disaster.
  - Multiple social media users in Mexico City, Morelos, State of Mexico, and Puebla report seeing a meteorite at 20:18 hours (8:18 pm)
- February 19
  - Xcaret Park is named the best theme park in the world for the fourth year in a row by the Travvy Awards.
  - Mexican scientist Héctor Carera Fuentes is arrested at Miami International Airport for spying for Russia.
- February 19 – 25: Carnaval de Veracruz
- February 20
  - Alfonso Durazo, Minister of Security, says that seven of ten weapons used by organized crime in Mexico are imported illegally from the United States.
  - Mexico bans the importation of e-cigarettes.
- February 21 – Mexico City mayor Claudia Sheinbaum promises that city employees who join the Woman's Strike on March 9 will not be penalized by the city government.
- February 23 – Lawyer Juan Collado, former husband of Leticia Calderón who has close ties to former presidents Calderón and Peña Nieto is formally accused of money laundering and association with organized crime.
- February 23 – 25 – Carnaval de Mazatlán, Sinaloa
- February 24 – A protest happens at Playa del Carmen over public access to a supposedly "private" beach.
- February 25
  - The U.S. Supreme Court rules that the parents of Sergio Hernandez Guereca cannot sue the U.S. Border Patrol for the teen's 2010 death. Mexican prosecutors had charged Agent Jesus Mesa Jr. with murder, but the U.S. government refused to extradite him.
  - 120,000 students at Meritorious Autonomous University of Puebla and Universidad Popular Autónoma del Estado de Puebla strike after three students are killed.
- February 26 – Mexican authorities refuse permission for a cruise ship registered in Malta to dock in Cozumel, Quintana Roo, because she carries a passenger presumed to be infected with Coronavirus disease 2019. The ship was previously denied access to ports in Jamaica and the Cayman Islands. On February 27, AMLO reversed the ruling, saying it would be "inhuman" to prohibit people from disembarking.
- February 28
  - The first two Mexican confirmed cases of COVID-19 have been identified by the Health Ministry. Family contacts of the patients have been placed in isolation.
  - The National Human Rights Commission announces that its president, Rosario Piedra Ibarra, will receive MXN $159,227.83 monthly, some $5,000 more than what her predecessor, Luis Raúl González Pérez, received and $51,000 more than President Andrés Manuel López Obrador, despite a law that prohibits any government employee from earning more than the president. Despite the official policy of austerity, other top officials will also be paid more than López Obrador. The third and fourth cases were confirmed on February 29.
  - The Mexican stock market closes the week with a 4% decrease in value due to fears of COVID-19. The peso also loses 2% of its value.
  - Former Nayarit governor Roberto Sandoval Castañeda and his wife and children are banned from entering the United States due to corruption.
- February 28 – March 1: Electric Daisy Carnival (electronic music), Mexico City
- February 29 – An appeals court in San Francisco rules against the U.S. government's "stay in Mexico" policy for asylum seekers, although the ruling is stayed until March 2.

=== March ===
- March 1
  - In a concession to the junk food industry, a judge from the Juzgado Séptimo de Distrito en Materia Administrativa (Seventh District Court in Administration) rules that companies do not have to label the sugar and fat content of their products.
  - Patricia Rosalinda Trujillo Mariel, Operational Coordinator of the National Guard, is fired for corruption.
- March 3 – A study by Código Magenta reveals links between the company that collected signatures for Jaime Rodríguez Calderón ("El Bronco") during his 2018 presidential campaign and money laundering.
- March 4
  - Six bank accounts controlled by La Luz del Mundo (English: Church of the Living God, Pillar, and Ground of the Truth, The Light of the World) are frozen by the Unidad de Inteligencia Financiera (UIF) (English: Financial Intelligence Unit) because of sex scandals involving child pornography and sexual relations with minors.
  - The Ministry of Health reports 1,455 cases of dengue fever, a 104.6% increase over the same period in 2019.
- March 6
  - The airline Interjet is near bankruptcy as it owes the federal government MXN $3 billion (US$150.6 million) and it is threatened by losses due to the COVID-19 pandemic. Meanwhile, AMLO proposes establishing a new airline in Mexico.
  - A shootout between police and members of an auto-theft gang leaves nine dead, including one police officer and a civilian bystander in Tlaquepaque, Jalisco.
  - Three people have died and 55 others require special medical attention after the Pemex hospital in Villahermosa, Tabasco, administers expired medicine.
- March 7
  - "Time for Women 2020" festival in Mexico City
  - Proceso says the government of the United States has evidence linking former presidents Peńa Nieto and Calderon and several generals and admirals to narcotics trafficking
- March 8 – 15,000 people participated in the Women's March in Monterrey. 80,000 march in Mexico City. Hundreds march in Tlaxcala; Ecatepec, State of Mexico; and Oaxaca.
- March 9
  - Women strike across the country, demanding an end to violence against women in Mexico. The CONCANACO estimates that the strike cost MXN $30 trillion (US$13.5 billion), 15% more than the original estimate.
  - Crude oil prices fall to US$24.43 a barrel, the lowest price since 2016. The peso loses 4.83% of its value compared to the U.S. dollar, at $21.17/dollar, as the world worries about the COVID-19 pandemic. The Mexican stock market fell 6%.
- March 10
  - The City of Mexico will publish the names, photographs, and other information about individuals convicted of sexual crimes, including femicide, human trafficking, sexual tourism, and abuses against minors.
  - It is revealed that the microphones discovered in the Senate of the Republic were paid for and installed by the National Action Party (PAN) in 2011 and 2012, not by National Regeneration Movement (Morena). Senators from PAN accused Morena of spying on them and forced the Senate to be shut down last week.
  - One person dies and 41 are injured in a crash in the Tacubaya metro station in Mexico City.
- March 11
  - The United States Department of Justice (DOJ) and the Drug Enforcement Administration (DEA) announce they have arrested more than alleged 600 members of the Jalisco New Generation Cartel (CJNJ).
  - A train crash at the Tacubaya station of the Mexico City Metro leaves one dead and 41 people injured.
- March 13
  - AMLO signs a decree that the victims of the 2009 ABC Day Care Center Fire in Hermosillo, Sonora, will be compensated.
  - Evidence of the Mayan kingdom of Sak Tz'i is proven near Lacanja Tzeltal, Chiapas.
  - The Canadian Parliament approves the T-MEC (English: United States–Mexico–Canada Agreement (USMCA)).
- March 14
  - Some universities close, sporting events are canceled, and other large group events are canceled or rescheduled for a later date as Mexico enters Phase 2 of the COVID-19 pandemic in Mexico. The Secretariat of Finance and Public Credit (SCHP) announced it was taking measures to prevent a 5% fall in gross domestic product (GDP).
  - Mexico City bans gatherings of groups of more than 1,000 people.
- March 14–15: Festival Vive Latino (rock and Latin music), Mexico City The festival goes on as scheduled, despite fears of the COVID-19 pandemic. Temperatures of the 70,000 people who attend each day are taken at the door and anti-bacterial gel is widely distributed. 26 cases of the virus are reported in Mexico, including 11 in Mexico City.
- March 16
  - 216th anniversary of Benito Juárez's birthday (Statutory holiday)
  - Deputy health minister Hugo López-Gatell denies a charge by El Salvador president Nayib Bukele that Mexico let a dozen people with COVID-19 board a plane.
  - The Health Department reports 82 confirmed and 171 suspected cases of COVID-19.
  - The Catholic Episcopal Conference of Mexico recommends suspending masses and other large group gatherings. Priests can continue with private masses.
  - A group of four Mexicans from Tamaulipas who went to Cusco, Peru, on vacation cannot return to Mexico until April 2 because all flights have been canceled and the borders of Peru are closed. Citizens of Ecuador, El Salvador, Peru, and Chile are stuck at Benito Juárez International Airport in Mexico City.
- March 17
  - The Mexican Stock Exchange closed for 15 minutes this morning after dropping 7.12% upon opening. This also happened last March 12. After reopening, the market fell by 8%.
  - Interjet announces it will reduce its seating capacity by 40% as a health measure.
- March 18
  - 82nd Anniversary of the oil expropriation (Civic holiday)
  - The first death from COVID-19 in Mexico is reported. The 41-year-old man attended a concert on March 3 and was hospitalized on March 9. He also had diabetes.
  - Twenty-five cases of measles are reported in Mexico City. The outbreak began in the Reclusario Norte (Northern penitentiary) last week.
  - Mexican crude oil prices fall to their lowest level (US$12.92 per barrel) since 2002.
- March 19 – A group of protesters block downtown Cuernavaca.
- March 20
  - U.S Secretary of State Mike Pompeo announces there will be restrictions on travel across the Mexico–United States border. Said restrictions would not apply to cargo.
  - A new report (in Spanish) by the Mexican Centre for Environmental Rights (Cemed) shows that at least 83 land rights and environmental defenders were murdered in Mexico between 2012 and 2019. 40% of the 2019 incidents of harassment and murder were the responsibility of state officials such as police officers, national guard, and local prosecutors.
  - Mexico opposes the reelection of Luis Almagro as Secretary-General of the Organization of American States (OAS).
  - Mayor Juanita Romero (PAN) of Nacozari de García Municipality, Sonora, declares a curfew, in effect until April 20. Only the President of Mexico has the legal authority to declare such a declaration.
- March 21 – A Mexican Navy helicopter crashes during an anti-kidnapping operation in Zongolica, Veracruz. One police officer is killed and ten military personnel are injured.
- March 23
  - The World Health Organization (WHO) says Mexico has entered Phase 2 of the COVID-19 pandemic with 338 confirmed cases. This includes cases where the sick individuals did not have direct contact with someone who had recently been in another country.
  - 76% of the voters in Mexicali, Baja California, voted that the partially-built brewery owned by Constellation Brands should not be completed. Only 36,781 people participated in the poll.
  - Mexico City reports 67 cases of measles, ten of whom had been vaccinated. There are 60 cases of COVID-19 in the city.
- March 24 – Mexico requests extradition of Emilio Lozoya.
- March 26 – Health officials report 5,983 cases and 102 deaths from influenza this year.
- March 27 – An investigation into the 2018 Puebla helicopter crash that killed Puebla governor Martha Érika Alonso and her husband, Rafael Moreno Valle Rosas was because of a stability problem due to poor maintenance.
- March 28
  - Seventy-three cases of measles have been confirmed in Mexico City and the State of Mexico. There are 196 confirmed cases (7 deaths) of coronavirus in Mexico City and 119 infections in the State of Mexico. Nationally, there have been more than 2,000 murders since the outbreak of the COVID-19 pandemic in February.
  - World Wide Fund for Nature calls for people to join the Earth Hour at 8:30 p.m. local time.
- March 30 – The Mexican Financial Unit (UIF), led by Santiago Nieto, blocks US$1 billion (MXN $1.5 billion) in accounts controlled by the Sinaloa Cartel and Rafael Caro Quintero.
- March 31 – A riot in a migrant detention center in Tenosique, Tabasco, leaves a Guatemalan man dead and four people injured. The detainees were worried about a possible COVID-19 outbreak.

=== April ===
- April 3
  - AMLO issues a decree to abolish 100 public trusts related to science and culture; the Finance Ministry (SHCP) will receive the money directly. The move is expected to save MXN $250 billion (US$10 billion).
  - A shoot-out between presumed drug dealers results in at least 19 deaths in Ciudad Madera, Chihuahua.
  - Mexico registers 2,585 homicides in March—the highest monthly figure since 1997—potentially breaking last year's record total for murders.
- April 5 – The traditional Passion Play of Iztapalapa begins inside the Iztapalapa Cathedral instead of parading the eight barrios of the borough. Extras who play Roman centurions, Pharisees, Jews, Nazarenes, and others are asked to stay home. In 2019, 5,000 people participated and 150 had speaking parts.
- April 7 – PAN conditions its support for less money for political parties on an abandonment of the Dos Bocas and Mayan Train infrastructure projects.
- April 8
  - President López Obrador says that fifteen large companies owe MMX $50,000,000,000 in taxes.
  - Charges of rape, child pornography, and human trafficking against Naasón Joaquín García, apostle of La Luz del Mundo church, are dropped for technical reasons.
- April 11 – Three doctors employed by IMSS are murdered in Tilzapotla, Puente de Ixtla, Morelos, during a presumed robbery.
- April 12 – The U.S. Customs and Border Protection says it has used the COVID-19 pandemic as a pretext to expel over 10,000 Mexican and Central American asylum seekers to Mexico.
- April 13 – The number of COVID-19 infections in the country passes 5,000; there are 332 deaths.
- April 15 – A report by Agence France-Presse (AFP) indicates that poppy growers in Guerrero are going out of business as cheaper fentanyl replaces poppies.
- April 16 – El Universal reports that several federal investigative units are looking into the wealth of former President Enrique Peña Nieto. AMLO says that any decision to prosecute will depend upon a referendum.
- April 20 – Drug cartels hand out aid packages of rice, pasta, cooking oil, and other household supplies. Javier Oliva Posada, defense specialist at the UNAM, commented that the packages reach a small number of people, but that they are designed to gain public and extend territory. Oliva Posada also noted that cartels are facing a shortage of supplies from China and a tightening of the border along the United States.
- April 21
  - Mexico begins Phase 3 of the COVID-19 pandemic in Mexico.
  - The Mexican Senate approves an amnesty law for minor offenders; it awaits the president's signature.
  - Some oil wells are closed as prices fall and Pemex's credit rating declines.
- April 22
  - The Global Initiative Against Transnational Organized Crime warns that Mexican cartels are branching into human trafficking and illegal logging.
  - The United States pressures Mexico to reopen factories with military contracts despite worker fears of contacting COVID-19. Lear Corporation acknowledges there have been coronavirus-related deaths among its 24,000 employees in Ciudad Juárez, but refuses to say how many.
  - COVID-19 pandemic: The number of reported cases passes 10,000.
- April 23
  - COVID-19 pandemic: Mexico surpasses the 1,000 deaths figure.
  - Grupo Alemán (Galem) acknowledges the embargo by the Tax Administration Service (SAT) in the facilities of the Miguel Alemán Valdés Foundation due to the MXN $549.3 million debt that Interjet has with the SAT. Interject is owned by Miguel Alemán Magnani, son of Miguel Alemán Velasco, former governor of Veracurz (PRI: 1998–2004) who is CEO of Galem. Interject and SAT have reached an agreement on payment.
  - Bank of Mexico (Banxico) issues a new MXN $20 commemorative coin to honor the 500th anniversary of the founding of city and port of Veracruz. It is smaller and lighter than previous coins and has twelve sides.
  - As Ricardo Ahued, administrator of the customs agency of the SAT, departs to run for the Senate, AMLO says corruption in the agency is a ″monster with 100 heads.″
- April 26 – Mexico's National Institute of Migration (INM) empties the 65 migrant detention centers it has across the country by returning 3,653 people to Guatemala, El Salvador, and Honduras in the hope of preventing outbreaks of COVID-19.
- April 28 – Marcelo Ebrard announces a new trade agreement with the European Community (EU).
- April 29 – Police in Yajalón, Chiapas, open fire on people who were protesting against a checkpoint that left their community isolated. Residents of neighboring Tumbalá complain that the checkpoint make it impossible for them to access governmental and banking services and that it seemed to be related to a belief that Tumbalá has a high rate of coronavirus infection. Checkpoints have been installed in about 20% of Mexico's municipalities, which the federal government has declared illegal.
- April 30 – Twenty-one deaths and 44 people hospitalized for drinking adulterated alcohol in Jalisco.

=== May ===
- May 1
  - COVID-19 pandemic:
    - Mexico passes 20,000 infections of COVID-19.
    - Christopher Landau, the American Ambassador to Mexico, asserts that protecting the lives of Mexican workers is less important than making sure the American military machine operates without a glitch. Many maquiladoras (assembly plants) along the border are being kept open to produce medical products for the U.S. market, even though the same products cannot be sold in Mexico. At least three people have died at European Schneider Electric, a factory in Tijuana, and 14 have died at an automobile parts factory in Ciudad Juarez. Three confirmed and five suspected COVID-19 deaths can be traced to Regal Beloit in Juarez.
    - Mexicanos contra la corrupción (Mexicans against corruption) alleges that Léon Manuel Bartlett, son of Manuel Bartlett, head of the Comisión Federal de Electricidad (CFE), fraudulently tried to sell overpriced ventilators to the Mexican Social Security Institute (IMSS) in Hidalgo. AMLO promises an investigation but also says the charges are designed to discredit his government.
  - Luis Rodríguez Bucio of the internal affairs unit of the National Guard announces that it has fired one of its officers after pictures of him celebrating with known criminals in Puebla circulated on social media.
  - AMLO cancels expensive wind and solar energy projects.
- May 2
  - COVID-19 pandemic: Mexico surpasses 2,000 deaths due to the COVID-19 pandemic on May 2.
  - The United States Department of Commerce announces that the Mexico-U.S. sugar agreement will continue for five years. Mexico faced accusations and fines for dumping, but these will be suspended. Mexico is allowed to export 421,901 metric tonnes (465,067 short tons) of sugar to the United States.
  - 61 forest fires are reported in fifteen states.
- May 3
  - Auctions of the house once owned by Amado Carrillo Fuentes ( Señor de Los Cielos), jewels, cars, and airplanes provide almost MXN $50 million for the Instituto Nacional para Devolver al Pueblo lo Robado ("National Institute to Return that Stolen to the People").
  - Roberta S. Jacobson, former U.S. ambassador to Mexico (2016–2018) insists that the Calderon government knew of the ties Genaro García Luna, Secretary of Public Security (SSP) (2006–2012) had with the Sinaloa Cartel. Calderon insists they did not.
- May 4
  - The Secretariat of Labor and Social Welfare singles out Grupo Elektra (10,000 employees), Autofin, and Hyplasa (more than 100 employees each) that refuse to close during the pandemic despite not providing essential services.
  - The arrest of Óscar Andrés Flores Ramírez, sets off a wave of homicides in Cuauhtémoc, and Venustiano Carranza, Mexico City, as extorcionists and drug dealers fight for control of La Union Tepito gang. 261 homicides have already been reported during the month of May, with Guanajuato (46), Jalisco (32). and State of Mexico (21) leading the list.
- May 5
  - The traditional parade in Puebla is canceled.
  - AMLO reports that remesas (remittances) sent by Mexicans living abroad to their relatives grew 35% in March compared to those of February 2020.
- May 6
  - Eruption of Popocateptl.
  - Eleven prisoners escape from a prison in Zacatecas.
- May 8
  - COVID-19 pandemic: More than 3,000 deaths related to the pandemic are reported. The New York Times reports that the federal government is underreporting deaths in Mexico City; the federal government reports 700 deaths in the city while local officials have detected over 2,500.
  - Two people die and twelve tractor-trailers are damaged along Mexican Federal Highway 40D when an EF-2 tornado hits Apodaca, Nuevo León. Four houses are damaged by a tornado in Metepec, Zacatlán, Puebla on May 9.
- May 9 – The Sevicio Nacional de Sanidad, Inocuidad y Calidad Agroalimentaria ("National Service of Health, Safety and Agro-Food Quality"), part of the Secretariat of Agriculture and Rural Development (SADER), issues a warning about the Asian giant hornet. The agency notes there are 43,500 beekeepers with 172,000 beehives in Mexico.
  - 267th anniversary of Miguel Hidalgo's birthday (Civic holiday)
- May 10 – Mother's Day (Public holidays in Mexico) Flower shops, bake shops, and cemeteries are closed to prevent large gatherings. July 10 is proposed as an alternative day of celebration.
- May 11 – The Supreme Court nullifies the Ley Bonilla (Bonilla Law), saying it was unconstitutional to increase the term of the Governor of Baja California from two to five years.
- May 12
  - AMLO signs an order that allows members of the Mexican Army and the Mexican Navy to participate in police activities for five years.
  - COVID-19 pandemic: More than 100 health workers are included among the 3,573 deaths from the virus.
- May 13 – COVID-19 pandemic: AMLO presents a three-stage plan to reopen the economy.
- May 15
  - Teacher's Day; schools closed
- At least 100 deaths have been reported due to adulterated alcohol in Morelos, Puebla, and Jalisco.
  - The Ministry of Energy (Sener) stops private renewable energy projects while strengthening the Federal Electricity Commission (CFE).
- May 16 – COVID-19 pandemic: Mexico reports more than 5,000 deaths.
- May 18
  - COVID-19 pandemic: Phase One of the government's plan to reopen the economy begins in 269 municipalities in 15 states. Mexico reports more than 50,000 cases.
  - A judge rules the conviction and nine-year prison sentence of former Verzcruz governor Javier Duarte de Ochoa; however, he rules in Duarte's favor regarding the illegal acquisition of property.
- May 20 – Alfonso Durazo of the Secretariat of Security and Civilian Protection (Mexico) reports a 1.66% decrease in murders from March to April this year. The highest numbers were in Guanajuato (1,534), State of Mexico (982), Chihuahua (906), Michoacán (886), and Baja California (880). Femicides dropped 10.25% to 70, and robberies fell 33.29%.
- May 22
  - Remains of sixty mammoths are found during construction of the Mexico City Santa Lucía Airport.
  - A 6.1M_{w} earthquake is reported 173 kilometres (107 mi) east-southeast of San José del Cabo, Baja California Sur. No damages and no tsunami were reported.
- May 25 – Walmart de México y Centroamérica agrees to pay MXN $8 billion (US$358 million) in back taxes after being sued by the Tax Administration Service (SAT).
- May 25 – COVID-19 pandemic: Mexico reaches a record of 3,455 new cases and 501 new deaths in one day. The daily death rate approaches that of the United States, where there are 620 deaths in one day.
- May 27 – Jaquelina Escamilla, head of the Women's Institute in Oaxaca de Juárez, Oaxaca, is fired for not broadcasting an anti-abortion video on the municipal media site. Abortion is legal in Oaxaca.
- May 28 – COVID-19 pandemic: Leaders of the LXIV Legislature of the Mexican Congress convoke their counterparts from nine other Latin American countries to discuss a response to the COVID-19 pandemic. Latin America has 706,798 confirmed cases and 38,384 deaths. Maximiliano Reyes Zuñiga, Assistant Secretary of Foreign Affairs (SRE), proposes three measures to finance the recuperation of the region, including a 3% tax on billionaires.
- May 29 – FEMSA agrees to pay MXN $8.79 billion in back taxes.
- May 30
  - Seven people including a local drug lord are killed and two are injured at a party in Tierra Blanca, Veracruz.
  - Hundreds of protesters, mostly driving luxury cars, participate in caravans in Mexico City and other cities to demand that AMLO resign.

=== June ===
- June 1
  - National Merchant Marine Day (Civic holiday)
  - President Andrés Manuel López Obrador announces a "new normal" of partial reopening with a road trip to Cancun and the inauguration of construction of the Mayan Train.
  - MORENA proposes an increase in taxes on tobacco, alcohol, and sugary soft drinks with the additional income going to support public health.
  - Foreign digital platforms such as Netflix and Spotify are required to withhold the value-added tax (IVA).
- June 2 – Working with the Drug Enforcement Administration (DEA), the Financial Intelligence Unit under Santiago Nieto freezes the bank accounts of 1,770 individuals, 167 businesses, and two trusts linked to the Jalisco New Generation Cartel (CJNG).
- June 3
  - Senator Lilly Téllez quits Morena and joins National Action Party (PAN).
  - Meteorologists predict between seven and nine major hurricanes and between 15 and 19 named storms this year. Tropical Storm Cristobal makes landfall in Astata, Campeche, 20 kilometres (12 mi) from Ciudad del Carmen and 75 kilometres (47 mi) east of Frontera, Tabasco causing flooding and driving people from their homes. In addition to Campeche and Tabasco, the states of Yucatan, Chiapas, Quintana Roo, Oaxaca, and Veracruz were affected.
  - Mexico surpasses 100,000 COVID-19 confirmed cases.
- June 4 – Violence breaks out during demonstrations in Jalisco to demand justice after the death of Giovanni López, 30, in Ixtlahuacán de los Membrillos.
- June 5 – Three police officers including the commissioner are arrested in connection with the May 5 beating death of Giovanni López.
- June 6 – Ten people are shot dead at a drug rehabilitation center in Irapuato, Guanajuato. Guanajuato reports 1,500 homicides this year.
- June 7
  - Seven police vehicles and a motorcycle are destroyed during a riot in San Pedro Cuajimalpa, Mexico City, while preventing the lynching of a driver who began shooting into a crowd following an auto accident.
  - With 117 murders, June 7 is the most violent day in Mexico this year.
- June 8
  - AMLO explains that a US$1 billion loan from the World Bank is not new debt but is a routine loan that was solicited last year.
  - The death toll from adulterated alcohol in Guerrero reaches 18.
- June 9
  - Official news agency Notimex shuts down until an agreement can be reached with striking workers.
  - Police in Acatlán de Pérez Figueroa, Papaloapan Region, Oaxaca, shoot nine teenagers, one fatally, while buying softdrinks.
- June 10 – A health clinic and city hall are burned by armed inhabitants of Las Rosas, Chiapas after the death of a peasant, apparently from COVID-19.
- June 11
  - Police in San Pablo Huitzo, Oaxaca, hand over two young men accused of theft to local citizens; one is lynched. The state human rights commission (DDHPO) has received 120 complaints of police abuse including two prisoner deaths this year.
  - The WHO reports a decrease in malaria in Latin America, including Mexico, although there are fears that many cases are going undetected as sick people stay home instead of going to hospitals.
- June 14 – Caravans of at between 50 and 900 luxury cars in 12 states demand that AMLO resign.
- June 16 – AMLO says that Mexico will sell fuel to Venezuela for humanitarian purposes if requested.
- June 17 – Mexico wins a two-year seat on the United Nations Security Council as well as a three-year term on the United Nations Economic and Social Council starting on January 1, 2021, during the 2020 U.N. Security Council Elections.
- June 23 – A magnitude 7.4 earthquake struck two kilometers northeast of Crucecita, Santa María Huatulco, Oaxaca at 10:29 a.m. with a depth of 22.6 kilometres (14.0 mi). Thirty aftershocks, including one of 5.4 M_{w} were reported. Nine deaths and more than 2,000 damaged homes were reported in the state. 46 million people in a dozen states across the country felt the earthquake. There are reports that the alarm system did not work in some parts of Mexico City.
- June 24 – A giant dust storm from the Sahara Desert hits southeast Mexico.
- June 25
  - A six-hour gunfight for control of the Sinaloa drug cartel leaves 16 dead in Tepuche, Sinaloa.
  - The Santa Rosa de Lima Cartel is accused of a bomb attempt at the Pemex refinery in Guanajuato after several of the cartel's leaders were arrested on June 20. The cartel is infamous for fuel theft and extortion.
- June 26 – Mexico City Police Chief Omar García Harfuch is wounded in the morning after he and his bodyguards were attacked by 50 heavily armed members of the Jalisco New Generation Cartel. Two police officers and a civilian woman were killed; García Harfuch is reported stable. Twelve of the attackers were arrested.

=== July ===
- July 1
  - The free-trade agreement known as T-MEC (English: United States–Mexico–Canada Agreement) is scheduled to take effect.
  - Twenty-eight people are killed in a mass shooting at a drug rehabilitation center in Irapuato, Guanajuato.
  - COVID-19: Mexico becomes the country with the seventh greatest number of deaths with 28.510, surpassing Spain. Mexico has 231,770 confirmed cases of infection, tenth in the world.
- July 3 – Quintana Roo Governor Carlos Joaquín González warns of the threat of Sargassum on the beaches of the Riviera Maya.
- July 4
  - COVID-19: Mexico surges to sixth place in the number of deaths with 30,366, surpassing France.
  - The Foreign Ministry announces that it formally adheres to the 189th International Labour Organization Convention on Domestic Workers.
- July 7 – Remains of a second student killed in the 2014 Iguala mass kidnapping are found and identified in Cocula Municipality, Guerrero. The remains were not found in the waste dump where the bodies of the students were previously said to be burned.
- July 8
  - In his first foreign visit, President López Obrador flies commercially from Mexico City to Atlanta and then to Washington, D.C. to meet with U.S. President Donald Trump to discuss trade, investment, health issues, and combatting organized crime. AMLO and Trump sign a joint declaration pledging to build "a shared future of prosperity, security, and harmony."
  - César Duarte Jáquez, former governor of Chihuahua (PRI) is arrested in Florida.
  - Paintings by Frida Kahlo and Rufino Tamayo are reported stolen from a private collection in Mexico City.
  - Two adult and three minor females are killed in an apparent reckong among gangs in El Gavillero, Nicolás Romero, State of Mexico.
- July 10 – 2014 Ayotzinapa kidnapping: Mexico seeks the arrest and extradition from Canada of Tomas Zeron, former head of the Criminal Investigation Agency that wrote the now-discredited "historical truth" about the kidnappings.
- July 11 – COVID-19 pandemic: Mexico surpasses the United Kingdom with 295,268 reported cases.
- July 12 – COVID-19 pandemic: Mexico becomes the country with the fourth greatest number of deaths in the world with 35,006, surpassing Italy.
- July 13
  - A network of eight to twelve doctors who worked with funeral homes to falsify death certificates related to both the September 19, 2017, earthquake and the COVID-19 pandemic in Mexico City is revealed.
  - The United States promises a $47 million (MXN $2 billion) aid package to fight drug traffic in Mexico.
- July 16 – WHO warns about an alarming drop in childhood vaccinations in Mexico.
- July 17
  - President López Obrador announces that the Mexican Armed Forces are in charge of customs at border crossings and seaports to combat corruption and drug smuggling.
  - Emilio Lozoya Austin, former director of PEMEX accused of corruption, is extradicted from Spain and immediately hospitalized for anemia and problems with his esophagus.
  - The Comité de Sanidad Vegetal de Quintana Roo (Plant Health Committee of Quintana Roo, Cesaveqroo) issues an alert for a plague of American grasshoppers that could also affect Campeche, Chiapas, Hidalgo, Oaxaca, San Luis Potosí, Tabasco, Tamaulipas, Veracruz, and Yucatán.
- July 18
  - A video showing 20 armoured vehicles and heavily armed paramilitary soldiers shouting pura gente del señor Mencho ("pure people of Señor Mencho"), a nickname for Nemesio Oseguera Cervantes, is attributed to the Jalisco New Generation Cartel (CJNG), circulates in social media.
  - Twenty young businessmen are kidnapped and one killed while on a "Vallartazo," or tour, from Guadalajara to Puerta Vallarta, Jalisco. The CJNG drug cartel has reportedly demanded ransom, but nothing has been heard from the men in a week.
- July 20 to 27 – Guelaguetza festival in Oaxaca City is presented online.
- July 21 – Three women are arrested for human trafficking as 23 children between 3 months and 15 years old are rescued in San Cristóbal de las Casas, Chiapas. 2 1/2-year-old Dylan, whose disappearance from a market sparked the investigation, is still missing.
- July 21–22 – Fifteen Huave people are tortured and burned alive in a political dispute in San Mateo del Mar, Oaxaca.
- July 22 – AMLO proposes major reforms in pensions. Bank stocks go up.
- July 23
  - The government announced 20 actions to repair the damage done during the Acteal massacre of 45 people including children in Chiapas in 1997. An Acuerdo de Solución Amistosa (Friendly Solution Agreement) is to be signed on September 3.
  - The volcano Popocatépetl had its most active day of 2020 with 1,348 minutes of quaking, plus emissions of gas, water vapor, and ashes.
- July 25
  - Former Secretary of the CDMX is Rosa Icela Rodríguez is named coordinator of ports and seacoasts.
  - A study of 20 states reveals an excess of 71,315 deaths for the first six months of the year, compared to 2019. Some but not all are related to the COVID-19 pandemic.
- July 26 – Hurricane Hanna hits southern Texas and parts of Mexico, causing flooding in a maternity ward in a hospital in Reynosa, Tamaulipas. A section of the border wall collapses. Flloding and fallen trees are reported in Monterrey, Nuevo León.
- July 27 – Federal Deputy Jesús de los Ángeles Pool Moo (QR-PRD) joins the PRD after leaving Morena on July 1.
- July 28
  - The government of Chihuahua announces it will place 21 properties owned by César Duarte Jáquez up for auction.
  - Child rape charges are refiled against Naasón Joaquín García, leader of the Guadalajara-based La Luz del Mundo church, and two alleged accomplices.
- July 29 – Nancy Guadalupe Sánchez Arredondo, substitute Senator for Vanessa Rubio (PRI-BC) changes her party affiliation to Morena.
- July 31
  - Santiago Nieto Castillo, head of the es:Unidad de Inteligencia Financiera (Financial Intelligence Unit, UIF) confirms an investigation against Luis Cárdenas Palomino, former Secretary of Public Security. The bank accounts of Cárdenas Palomino, Genaro García Luna, and Ramón Pequeño have been frozen.
  - COVID-19 pandemic: With 46,688 deaths, Mexico moves into third place in the number of fatalities, behind the United States and Brazil.

=== August ===
- August 1 – The National Autonomous University of Mexico (UNAM) is rated the second-best university in Latin America by the Webometrics Ranking of World Universities of the Spanish National Research Council (SCIC), surpassed by only the University of São Paulo.
- August 2 – José Antonio Yépez Ortiz, "El Marro," leader of the Santa Rosa de Lima cartel, is arrested.
- August 5 – Emilio Lozoya Austin is charged with four counts of corruption similar to the 2013–2014 Estafa Maestra ("Master Scam").
- August 6
  - The Secretaría de la Contraloría General de la Ciudad de México (Mexico City comptroller) reports that between January 2019 and February 2020, 1,680 public servants in the city were sanctioned for acts of corruption.
  - The state legislature of Oaxaca bans the sales of sugary drinks and junk food to minors. Public Health Nutrition reveals that Coca-Cola has financed pseudo-scientific studies to demonstrate that drinking sugary drinks does not contribute to obesity.
  - Víctor Manuel Toledo Manzur, Secretary of Environment and Natural Resources offers his resignation after an audio recording of his opposition to the Mayan Train is made public.
  - COVID-19 pandemic: 50,000 deaths The United States Department of State classifies travel to Mexico as "high risk."
- August 7
  - AMLO sets up a "justice commission" to solve land, water, and infrastructure problems for the Yaqui in Sonora.
  - Nobel Prize-winning scientist Mario J. Molina calls for a complete ban on fuel oil in the production of electricity.
- August 11 – Tamaulipas Governor Francisco Javier García Cabeza de Vaca is investigated for money laundering and ties to drug dealers.
- August 12
  - While reiterating the independence of the Attorney General of Mexico (Fiscalía General de la República, FGR), AMLO says that former President Enrique Peña Nieto will have to testify in regard to the accusations of Emilio Lozoya Austin. For the second time, he accuses former president Felipe Calderón of leading narcoestado (drug lord state).
  - Jesús Orta and eighteen other former top police officials are arrested in a crackdown on corruption.
  - Hugo Bello, leader of the Confederacón Libertad de Trabajadores de México, (Freedom Confederation of Mexican Workers) is arrested for kidnapping and the union's suspected involvement in embezzlement of money destined for construction of the now-defunct Mexico City Texcoco Airport (NAIM) in Texcoco.
- August 13
  - COVID-19 pandemic:
    - Mexico reports more than 500,000 confirmed cases.
    - AMLO decrees thirty day of mourning for victims of the pandemic, from August 13 to September 11. This is in addition to the minute of silence offered during the President's daily press conferences.
  - The company that built the Estela de la Luz in CDMX as a monument to President Felipe Calderón is ordered to pay back MXN $447.1 million for overcharges.
- August 14 – Over 1,000 employees of the National Migration Institute (INM) are fired for corruption.
- August 14 to 17 – Chiapas conflict: Paramilitary groups from Santa Martha, Chenalhó, carry out 26 attacks against villagers in Aldama Municipality, Chiapas.
- August 15 – The Registro Nacional de Personas Desaparecidas (Nation Registry of Missing Persons) reports an increase in the number of missing children and teenagers. There are 73,000 missing persons in Mexico, with the largest number of cases in Tamaulipas (11,000), Jalisco (10,000), and the State of Mexico (7,000).
- August 17
  - A Google Doodle honors Mexican translator, professor, and author Librado Silva Galeana on his 78th birthday.
  - Heavy rains are expected along the Pacific coast as Hurricane Genevieve is elevated to Category 2.
  - Querátero Governor Francisco Domínguez Servién fires his secretary, Guillermo Gutiérrez Badillo after the latter appears on a video receiving money from a director of Pemex.
- August 18
  - Genevieve becomes a Category 4 hurricane as it approaches Jalisco and Baja California Sur. Waves up to 6 metres (20 ft) are reported in Jalisco, Colima, and Michoacán.
  - COVID-19 pandemic: Hugo López-Gatell declares that the pandemic is clearly in descent as daily cases and deaths decline for six consecutive weeks.
  - AMLO reveals that President Carlos Salinas de Gortari ceded a 50-year concession to a private company to operate the Port of Veracruz, and that President Peña Nieto extended the concession to 2094.
  - The Financial Intelligence Unit (UIF) of the Treasury Department (SCHP) freezes the bank accounts of Aquiles Córdova Morán, Juan Manuel Celis, and other leaders of the Antorcha Campesina (Torch of the Peasantry) in the states of Mexico and Puebla.
- August 19
  - Two deaths are reported in Cabo San Lucas, Baja California Sur, due to Hurricane Genevieve.
  - Members of the Sindicato de Telefonistas de la República Mexicana (Telephone Workers' Union of Mexico, STRM) call a national strike in protest of the destruction of their pension system by Telmex.
- August 20
  - Journalist Carlos Loret de Mola of Latinas shows two videos from 2015 wherein Pio López Obrador, brother of the President and head of Morena in Chiapas, received packages of cash from David León Romero, who has been nominated to head the government agency responsible for delivering medicine to the Secretariat of Health.
  - COVID-19 pandemic: Mexico City passes 10,000 deaths, 17% of the total.
- August 21 – AMLO says the money his brother Pio received from David León involved private donations, not bribes. AMLO also expressed his willingness to testify. León Romero says he was a consultant, not a public servant, at the time of the videos, and that he will not accept the position he has been nominated for until this matter has been cleared up.
- August 22
  - COVID-19 pandemic: More than 60,000 deaths are reported.
  - An "antimonument" in the form of 72+ is erected on Paseo de la Reforma in CDMX in front of the U.S. Embassy to commemorate the 2010 San Fernando massacre in Tamaulipas.
  - The Human Rights Commission of Guanajuato (PDHG) opens an investigation of police in relation to the arrest of 29 women, including four reporters, during a protest demonstration.
  - José Antonio Rojas Nieto, Finance director of the Federal Electricity Commission (FCE) resigns. Sánchez Aguilar is appointed in his place.
- August 24 – Schools reopen across the country.
- August 25 – The confederation of Gobernadores de Acción Nacional (Governors of National Action Party, GOAN) and opposition parties protest against the 13–0 decision of the Baja California Sur legislature to remove five and sanction three of its members for missing five sessions in a row.
- August 26 – Defense Secretary Luis Cresencio opens an investigation involving two dozen soldiers involved in the killing of nine gang members and three kidnap victims in Nuevo Laredo in July.
- Grupo Modelo becomes the latest industrial giant to agree to pay its back taxes, MXN$2 billion.
- August 30 – Juan Collado, the former lawyer of ex-President Peña Nieto, is charged with tax evasion of MXN #6 million in 2015. This is in addition to earlier charges of organized crime and money laundering, in addition to possible charges for bank fraud in Andorra.
- August 31
  - AMLO criticizes the Labor Party (PT) for its maneuvers to take over the presidency of the Chamber of Deputuies. Due to party defections, PT and PRI are tied as the third-largest political party in the Chamber with 46 seats each.
  - Gerardo Sosa Castelán, chairman of the board of the Universidad Autónoma del Estado de Hidalgo (UAEH) is arrested for money laundering, embezzlement, and tax fraud. Sosa Castelán had already been implicated in the US$156 million Estafa Maestra.

=== September ===
- September 1 – President Andrés Manuel López Obrador gives his Second Informe (Report) in the Legislative Palace of San Lázaro. He says, "En el peor momento está el mejor gobierno" ("At the worst time there is the best government").
- September 2
  - Acteal massacre: The government accepts its responsibility for the December 1997 massacre and apologizes to the surviving victims.
  - Luz María de la Mora, Undersecretary for Trade, announces that trade between Mexico and the United States in the first quarter of the year amounted to US$290 billion, making Mexico the largest trading partner of the United States.
- September 2 to 7 – Hay Festival Querétaro will be online.
- September 4 – The Times Higher Education World University Rankings rates the UAM at number 601, ITESM at number 800, and UNAM at number 801.
- September 6 – Tropical Storm Julio: Waves up to 3 metres (9.8 ft) in Jalisco and Nayarit.
- September 7
  - The 2020–2021 electoral process begins. Elections will be held on June 6, 2021.
  - Governors of ten states leave the National Governors' Conference, CONAGA.
- September 8 – Opposition Senators demand accountability from Rosario Piedra Ibarra, president of the National Human Rights Commission, in relation to the occupation of the Human Rights Commission headquarters by a group of feminists. The occupation began on September 3, and demonstrators say they may occupy other facilitities if their demands are not met.
- September 9
  - Two demonstrators are killed by the National Guard while protesting against sending water from La Boquilla Dam in Chihuahua to the United States as stipulated in a 1944 treaty.
  - The SCHP presents its 2021 budget without proposed increases in taxes or debt. Infrastructure projects such as the airport of Santa Lucia and the Mayan Train plus the health sector are given priority. Tourism (mostly for the Mayan Train), SEDATU, SEDENA, National Electoral Institute (INE), and the TEPJF are the areas with the greatest increases. The Chamber of Deputies receives an increase, but the Senate and the Human Rights Commission will have budget cuts. The total budget is MXN $6.295 trillion (US 293.6 billion) with projected income of MXN $5.539 trillion (US$258.34 billion) with the largest single item for BIENESTAR (MXN $190 billion).
  - COVID-19 pandemic: Six former Health Secretaries release a report critical of the government's response to the virus, saying that increased testing and mapping of cases could lead to containing infections in six to eight weeks.
- September 11 – Members of the feminist group Manada Periferia complain that male police officers used unnecessary force to arrest eleven adults and eight minors who were occupying the offices of the state human rights commission (Codem) in Ecatapec, State of Mexico.
  - The CFE estimates damages caused by protesters to La Boquilla Dam at MXN $100 million (US$4.7 million).
- September 11–12
  - Festival Pa′l Tecate Norte (Mexican and Latin music) in Fundidora Park, Monterrey Originally scheduled for March 20–21
  - Festival Corona Capital (rock and indie music) in Guadalajara Rescheduled from April
- September 14 – Pasta de Conchos mine disaster: The government and family members of the 65 victims of the 2006 exlosion reached an agreement on rescuing the bodies and compensating the families.
- September 15
  - Grito de Dolores: AMLO gives his second Grito amidst special health restrictions.
    - Three hospitals are among the one hundred winners of the for the presidential airplane. A kindergarten in Aramberri, Nuevo León also won.
  - Pope Francis names Rutilo Felipe Pozos Lorenzini Bishop of the Roman Catholic Diocese of Ciudad Obregón.
  - UIF freezes the accounts of former governor of Chihuahua José Reyes Baeza Terrazas for embezzlement of MXN $129 million (US$6.14 million) related to the Estafa Maestra ("Master Scam") while Reyes Baeza was the director of FOVISSSTE.
- September 16 – Independence Day, national holiday
  - The traditional military parade in the Zócalo is televised but closed to the public.
  - Fifty-eight health workers from hospitals of IMSS, ISSSTE, Insabi, Semar, and Pemex receive the Condecoración Miguel Hidalgo for their work in combatting the COVID-19 pandemic.
- September 17 – The government demands an explanation as to why immigrants in Georgia were forcibly given hysterectomies.
- September 19 – The flag in the Zócalo is raised to half mast in memory of the victims of the 1985 earthquake and the 2017 earthquake.
- September 22 – Jaime Cárdenas Gracia, head of the Instituto para Devolverle al Pueblo lo Robado (Institute to Return that which was stolen to the People, Indep), resigns and Ernesto Prieto, formerly of the National Lottery, replaces him.
- September 23
  - SAT: The Tax Administration Service reveals that between 2007 and 2018 MXN $413 billion in taxes was forgiven. Of the 647 large contributors whose accounts have been reviewed, two unidentified companies still refuse to pay their debts. The SAT denounced 497 public servants for acts of corruption.
  - Two Mexicans, Gabriela Cámara, a chef at Contramar, and Arussi Unda, feminist (Las Brujas del Mar) are included in the list of one hundred most influential people in the world by Time.
- September 25 – The government reveals that two politically connected families are behind the demonstrations against the 1944 water treaty with the United States. Demonstrations at La Boquilla dam have left MXN $100 million. AMLO announces changes in the leadership of CONAGUA.

=== October ===
- October 2
  - Marches are cancelled but social events are held to commemorate the 52nd anniversary of the Tlatelolco massacre.
  - AMLO deploys 26,000 soldiers on the southern border to block an immigrant caravan originating in Honduras.
- October 3
  - Six police officers and two civilians die in an anbush in San Antonio de Padua, Durango.
  - Quintana Roo is on red-alert and flooding is expected in Tabasco and Chiapas due to Tropical Storm Gamma.
- October 18 – Elections
  - Coahuila: PRI wins 16 of 32 municipalities with 49.31% of the votes, second place for MORENA (19.3%), and third place for PAN (9.9%).
  - Hidalgo: PRI wins 32 municipalities, PAN five plus six others in alliance with PRD, and MORENA six plus another five in alliances with PVEM, PES, and PT.
- October 27 – Hurricane Zeta makes landfall in Tulum, Quintana Roo, without reports of deaths or major damages.
- October 29 – Authorities in the Mexican state of Guanajuato discover a mass grave containing 59 bodies.

=== November ===
- November 6 – Twenty-one people are killed and 80,000 are homeless because of Tropical Storm Eta.
- November 7 – AMLO cancels his tour after floods in Tabasco kill 20 and damage thousands of homes in Villahermosa, Tabasco. Opening the Peñitas Dam southwest of Villahermosa leaves 184,000 homeless in Tabasco, Chiapas, Veracruz, and Quintana Roo.
- November 9 – Cancun police shoot at demonstrating feminists, wounding a female reporter.
- November 9–20 – El Buen Fin
- November 11
  - AMLO apologizes for insulting Alonso Ancira, president of Altos Hornos de México who was recently arrested in Spain for cheating the Mexican government on the sale of a fertilizer plant. “Yes, I'm offering an apology, now just return the 200 million dollars," said López Obrador.
  - Mexico receives praise from international human rights advocates for changing responsibility for the care of migrant children from the National Migration Institution (NIM) to the National System for Integral Family Development (DIF).
- November 12 – Members of the Attorney General of Tabasco's office remove drinking water and food from a flooded convenience store to distribute among victims of the flooding in Tabasco.
- November 13 – The Senate begins debate on recreational use of marijuana.
- November 14 – The anti-AMLO coalition (Frente Nacional Anti-AMLO, FRENAA) lifts its demonstration in the Zócalo of Mexico City after one of its members is accused of sex abuse.
- November 15
  - COVID-19: More than 1,000,000 total positive cases are confirmed.
  - AMLO admits that low-lying, indigenous, "poor" areas of Tabasco were flooded to save the city of Villahermosa.
- November 16 – Thirteen people are killed and four vehicles are killed when an automobile and a truck carrying LP gas collide on the Guadalajara-Tepic tollway Km. 106.
- November 17 – Prosecutors in the United States drop the charges against General Salvador Cienfuegos Zepeda so he can be tried in Mexico.
- November 18 – The Chamber of Deputies approves a Constitutional amendment guaranteeing indigenous languages the same legal status as Spanish.
- November 21 – President López Obrador participates virtually in the 2020 G20 Riyadh summit.
- November 23 – Police in Celaya kill a tamal vendor by kneeling on his neck for ten minutes.
- November 25 – LeBarón and Langford families massacre: Three suspects are arrested in connection with the 2019 murder of three women and nine children belonging to a Mormon sect.

=== December ===
- December 3 – AMLO says that the government of the United States helped him secure an agreement from Pfizer to secure 34.4 million doses of its COVID-19 vaccine, including 250,000 doses in December.
- December 4 – Pemex cancels its contracts with Litoral Laboratorios Industriales SA de CV, which is owned by Felipa Guadalupe Obrador Olán, cousin of President López Obrador.
- December 5 – PAN, PRI, and PRD announce an electoral alliance for the 2021 Mexican legislative election.
- December 6 – AMLO calls for an end of diplomatic immunity for Drug Enforcement Administration (DEA) agents.
- December 7
  - López Obrador names Galia Borja Gómez Assistant Secretary of the Banco de Mexico, Graciela Márquez Colín to the board of directors oF INEGI, and Tatiana Clouthier as Secretary of the Treasury. Elvira Concheiro is named Secretary of the Federation and Captain Ana Laura López Bautista is named coordinator of ports.
  - The Secretary of Foreign Relations (SRA) has solicited the extradition of Genaro García Luna, former Secretary of Public Security, who is on trial in the United States for drug trafficking and money laundering.
  - A Campeche judge has indefinitely suspended construction of Section 2 of the Tren Maya (Escárcega to Calkiní).
- December 8 – COVID-19 pandemic: Distribution of the vaccine will begin late in December, after the Pfizer vaccine is approved in the United States and by Mexican authorities. First to receive the vaccine will be 125,000 health workers in CDMX and the state of Coahuila; full coverage will take until 2022.
- December 10 – Alejandro Encinas, deputy interior minister responsible for human rights, calls upon the State of Veracruz to reopen the investigation into the death of Ernestina Ascencio, a 73-year-old indigenous woman who died after being reportedly raped by members of the armed forces.
- December 10—13 – COVID-19 pandemic: For the first time in its 400-year history, the Basilica of Our Lady of Guadalupe is closed. Several metro and metrobus stations in the area are also closed.
- December 11
  - CFE and the government of France sign an agreement to develop geothermal energy in Mexico.
  - Cardinal Carlos Aguiar, archbishop of Mexico City, endorses civil unions for gay couples.
  - Archaeologists find remains of 119 more people in the "Aztec Tower of Skulls".
- December 14 – AMLO congratulates President-elect Joe Biden on his victory in the United States Electoral College.
- December 15
  - The United Kingdom and Mexico sign a continuity trade agreement; the UK retains its European Union benefits.
  - The Instituto Nacional Electoral (INE) complains that the attorney general (FGR) and (FEPADE) has blocked information about Odebrecht and Pío López Obrador.
  - Samuel García, Citizens' Movement candidate for governor of Nuevo León, whines that political opponents question how much he suffered as a child for being forced to play golf with his father or the suffering of families who earn "mini-salaries" of MXN $50,000/month (US$2507). Conservative former president Felipe Calderón joined the critics. The average salary in Mexico is US$1,358/month, and 20% of workers make the minimum wage of MXN $123.22/day (US$6.53).
- December 16
  - COVID-19 pandemic
    - According to a survey by the Instituto Nacional de Salud Pública (National Institute of Public Health—INSP), 31 million Mexicans, 25% of the population, has been exposed to the virus.
    - 150 members of SEDENA and 50 members of SEMAR begin training for application of the Pfizer-BioNTech COVID-19 vaccine. Vaccination will begin on December 22.
  - Education Secretary Esteban Moctezuma Barragán is named Ambassador of Mexico to the United States following the retirement of Martha Bárcena Coqui.
- December 18 – Former governor Aristóteles Sandoval (PRI) of Jalisco is assassinated in Puerto Vallarta.
- December 19
  - AMLO and United States President-elect Joe Biden discuss a new approach to migration issues during a phone call.
  - A photograph of Pedro Gabriel Hidalgo Cáceres, state leader of PAN in Tabasco, illegally collecting MXN $10,000 destined for flood victims, circulates on social media.
- December 20 – AMLO proposes that the armed forces control Maya Train and the airports of Chetumal, Palenque, and 'Felipe Ángeles' of Mexico City to free them of dependence on civilian oversight.
- December 21
  - Security measures are increased in Puerto Vallarta following the assassination of Aristóteles Sandoval.
  - AMLO names Delfina Gómez Álvarez the new head of SEP.
  - Two precandidates for mayor from MORENA in Guerrero, Efrén Valois Morales (Pilcaya) and Mario Figueroa (Taxco de Alarcón) are attacked by armed assailants. Valois Morales dies.
  - Aeroméxico renews flights of the Boeing 737 MAX on its Mexico City-Cancun routes.
- December 22
  - The Committee to Protect Journalists says Mexico is the most dangerous country for journalists in the world.
  - Celaya, Villagrán, and Cortazar, Guanajuato see a wave of violence after a high-ranking member of the Santa Rosa de Lima Cartel is arrested.
- December 23
  - COVID-19 pandemic: The first batch of vaccines arrive in Mexico.
  - A poll by Morning Consult lists President Lopez Obrador as the second most popular president in the word, after India's Narendra Modi.
- December 25 – 2018 Puebla helicopter crash: Four people who worked for Rotor Flight Services are arrested in connection with the crash.
- December 28 – CFE reported electrical failures in six entities. The National Center for Energy Control (Cenace) explained, ″[T]here was an imbalance in the National Interconnected System between the load and the power generation, causing a loss of approximately 7,500 MW." Later reports indicate that from 12 to 21 entities were effected by the blackout.
- December 29 – Dozens of Cuban migrants demonstrate in Ciudad Juarez to be allowed to cross the border into the United States to seek asylum.
- December 30 – INE insists that Morena Party remove a video from Twitter entitled Extirpemos el tumor de México until election camoaigns begin on April 3, 2021.
- December 31
  - A report by the Universidad Autónoma Metropolitana (UAM) shows that 20% of the nation's water is controlled by 1.1% of the population.
  - An oil pipeline in Dos Bocas was temporarily shut down due to a fire.
  - AMLO proposes a popular consultation among women on abortion.

== Predicted and scheduled events ==
- June (TBA) – Hospital de la Salud (Health hospital) is scheduled to oped open with 500 medical and 500 nursing students. The hospital will train medical professionals primarily for community service.
- October 10 to 18 – The Monterrey International Book Fair is cancelled.
- October 14 to 18 – The Festival Internacional Cervantino (FIC) will be presented online.
- December 1 – The Instituto de Salud para el Bienestar (Insabi) (English: Institute of Health for Welfare) will go fully into effect and stop charging for services.
- TBA
  - 'OUM Wellness' which will be built by the consortium Edificios Cero Energía in San Pedro Garza García, Nuevo León will be the first net-zero energy building (NZEB) in Latin America.
  - 'La Torre Reforma Colón' designed by Javier Sordo Madaleno in Cuauhtémoc, Mexico City, at 309 meters tall will be the tallest building in Latin America; projected for completion.

== 2020 in numbers ==
Crime

- Mexican drug war – The government reports a six-fold increase in fentanyl in 2020.
- Murders – 34,523 homicides (0.4% decrease); femicides 1,015 (0.3% increase).
- Huachicoleros – The FGR says that 850,000 liters (220,000 U.S. gal) of stolen fuel were decommissioned and 94 people were arrested. 2,536 clandestine faucets were found and put out of service.

Economics

- Price of crude oil (December 31) – US $47.16 per barrel, a 16% loss for the year.
- Fuel price (averages December 31) – Regular gasoline: MXN $18.177, Premium: MXN $18.734, Diesel: MXN $19.388, Vehicular natural gas: MXN $9.248
- Debt – Pemex and CFE reported a debt of MXN $2.26 trillion (US$109.7 billion), a 13.9% increase over 2019.
- Overnight interbank interest rate (December 17) – 4.25%.
- Exchange rate (December 31) – MXN / USD: 18.93.
- Annual inflation rate – Estimated <3.0%.
- Poverty – In May the United Nations Economic Commission for Latin America and the Caribbean (ECLAC) estimated a 9.1% contraction in the economy, leading 9.6 million people living in poverty (49.5% of the population) and 3.4 million people living in extreme poverty (an increase to 17.4.%).
- Transfer payments – Mexicans living abroad, mostly in the United States, sent a record US$40.6 billion to their families in Mexico. The average payment was $340.

Health

- COVID-19 pandemic in Mexico totals – 1,426,094 infections and 125,807 deaths (December 31). 9,579 people received the first dosis of the vaccine (as of December 24).
- INEGI reported (August 2020) that the principal causes of death were: heart disease (20.8%), COVID-19 (15.9%), and type 2 diabetes (14.6%). 58.7% of the dead were men and 41.1% were women. Data (January 2021) show 40% ″excessive deaths″ and 954,517 total deaths. Final results will be published in October 2021.

Population

- 2020 Census
  - 126,014,024 total (51.2% female, 48.8% male); 1.2% growth per year since 2010; eleventh most populous in the world.
  - 15 million (12%) over 60 years old, median age 29; youngest state is Chiapas (median 24) and oldest is Mexico City (median 35).
  - 62% of the population over 12 are economically active (men 75.8%, women 49.0%).

== Entertainment and culture ==
=== Bullfighting ===
- January 19 to February 16 – The second part of the 2019–20 bullfighting season at Plaza de Toros México in Mexico City.

=== Fashion ===
- July 10–18-year-old Karen Vega becomes the first model from Oaxaca to be featured on the cover of Vogue México y Latinoamérica magazine.
- July 12 – Designer Carla Fernández teams up with ten artisans from Michoacan, Colima, Oaxaca, Chiapas, and Guerrero to make ecological face masks based upon traditional wooden masks.
- December 15 – French designer Isabel Marant apologizes for stealing indigenous designs from Michoacán, State of Mexico, Tlaxcala, San Luis Potosí, and Oaxaca.

=== Film ===
- February 9: 92nd Academy Awards in Los Angeles
  - Fernando Luján was remembered as a "movie legend" at the Academy Awards ceremony.
  - Luis Manuel Villreal, 47, from Monterrey wins an Oscar for Best Animated Short Film, Hair Love.
- May 29 to June 7 – The Guadalajara International Film Festival participates in the We Are One: A Global Film Festival.
- June 23 – Laura Mariana Meraz, a Mexican national who lives in Brooklyn, New York City, wins the New York City Quarantine Film Festival with the short film 19 Times.
- August 30 – Blanco de verano, directed by Rodrigo Ruiz Patterson, is selected the best Iberoamerican feature-length movie at the Málaga Film Festival. Fabián Corres wins best supporting actor; and Ruiz Patterson and Raúl Sebastián Quintanilla win the award for best script. Arturo Ripstein wins a retrospective award for El diablo entre las piernas.
- September 9 – Vilcek Prize in Filmmaking to Rodrigo Prieto; for Creative Promise in Filmmaking, Juan Pablo González.
- September 12 – Director Michel Franco wins the Silver Lion Grand Jury Prize for Nuevo Orden (New Order) at the Venice Film Festival.
- October – Morelia International Film Festival: Sin señas particulares directed by Fernanda Valadez wins "Best Mexican Film."
- November 17 – Sin señas particulares directed by Fernanda Valadez wins first prize ("Golden Alexander") at the Thessaloniki International Film Festival in Greece.
- TBA: 62nd Ariel Awards for excellence in film-making

=== Literature ===
- January 24 – Writer Guillermo Arriaga wins the Premio Alfaguara de Novela for his novel, Salvar el fuego.
- February 13 – The El Colegio de México awards the Alfonso Reyes International Prize to American historian Herbert S. Klein.
- June 10 – The Princess of Asturias Award for Literature is awarded to the Guadalajara International Book Fair.
- September 18 – Juana Peñate Montejo wins the Premio de Literaturas Indígenas de América (Indigenous Literature of America Prize, PLIA) for the Chʼol language poem Isoñil ja’al ("Water Dance").
- December 29 – The National Prize for Arts and Sciences is awarded to four men, and in a controversial move a special award is given to Bertha Navarro y Solares.

=== Music ===
- January 14 – Manuel Antonio Casas Camarillo of Oaxaca wins second place in the Golden Classical Music Award in New York City, United States.
- January 19 – Actress Yalitza Aparicio made a surprise appearance with Chilean singer Mon Laferte while she sang Plata ta tá at the Palacio de los Deportes. Aparicio held up a hand-written sign that said, "No es mi color de piel, mi clase social, mi cultura o mi preferencia sexual lo que determina quien soy, son mis valores". ("It is not my skin color, my social class, my culture or my sexual preference that determines who I am, they are my values.")
- May 28 & 31 – Virtual pop concerts organized by Ocesa, featuring María José, Los Claxons, María León, and others.
- September 27 – German rock and metal band Rammstein performs at Foro Sol in Mexico City.
- November 20 – Natalia Lafourcade wins three awards at the Latin Grammy Awards including Latin Grammy Award for Album of the Year for Un Canto Por México, Vol. 1.

=== Television ===
- February 24
  - Como tú no hay 2 comedy-drama premiers on El Canal de las Estrellas
  - ¡Qué Chulada! (TV program) talk show debuted on Imagen Televisión.
- August 18–20: 'Expo Cine Video Television' in Mexico City
- August 19–21: 'TecnoTelevision Mexico' at the World Trade Center Mexico City is for professionals in broadcasting, production, and post-production.

=== Visual arts ===
- January 15 – The controversial nude painting of Emiliano Zapata, La Revolución by Fabián Cháirez is purchased by Spanish businessperson Tatxo Benet.
- February 5–9 – Contemporary Art Week at four locations in Mexico City The fair in "Zona Macro" is considered the most important contemporary art fair in Latin America.
- July 1–17 – An open-air art exhibit called Conexión (Connection) where works of art are displayed in windows, doors, walls, and terraces was on held in several Mexico City neighborhoods. Works by Teresita de la Torre, Cole M. James, Itzamina Reyes, Nasser Dłaz, and Alfredo Esparza Cárdenas, among others, were on display.
- September 8 – The Museo del Palacio de Bellas Artes in CDMX reopens with an exposition by 20th-century Italian painter Amedeo Modigliani.

=== Other ===
- January 8
  - XHCHM-FM radio station closes after seven years.
  - XHPAT-FM radio station closes after eight years.
- March 7 – Valentina Fluchaire is chosen "Miss International Queen" in the transgender beauty contest in Thailand.
- March 13 to 15 – La Mole Convention (comic books), Centro Citibanamex, Mexico City
- June 10 – Karime López is the first Mexican woman to win a Michelin star.

== Sports ==
=== Association football and soccer ===
- January 10 – Close of Liga MX and Liga MX Femenil soccer seasons begin.
- January 20 – The La Comisión Disciplinaria de la Federación Mexicana de Futbol (Disciplinary Commission of the Mexican Soccer League) disciplines Estadio Jalisco after fans yelled homophobic insults.
- February 22 – Rodolfo Cota, goalie for Club León, protests against femicide and may be suspended for three matches and fined MXN $300,000.
- February 22 to March 8 – Campeonato Femenino Sub-20 Concacaf 2020 (Concacaf 2020 Under-20 Women's Championship) in the Dominican Republic
- March 26 – The Mexico national soccer team plays an exhibition game against the Czech Republic national soccer team in Charlotte, North Carolina.
- March 29 – The Mexico national soccer team plays an exhibition game against the Greek national soccer team in Arlington, Texas.
- May 18 – The Liga MX officially closes without a champion.
- May 29 – Guillermo Álvarez Cuevas and two other executives of Cruz Azul soccer club are investigated for money laundering.
- June 2 – Monarcas Morelia announce they will move to Mazatlan next year.
- July 24 – Liga MX is scheduled to begin matches, but without the public.
- December 13 – Club León defeats the Pumas 3-1 for the Guardianes 2020 Liga MX championship.
- December 14 – Tigres Femenil defeat Rayadas 3-2 for the Liga MX femenil championship.

=== Auto and motorcycle racing ===
- February 15 – 2020 Mexico City ePrix won by Mitch Evans
- March 12 to 15 – 2020 Rally Mexico, León, Guanajuato to Guanajuato City; won by Toyota Gazoo Racing WRT
- July 24 – Formula One races are canceled in Mexico and other countries during 2020.
- December 6 – Sergio Pérez wins the 2020 Sakhir Grand Prix.

=== Baseball, softball, and cricket ===
- February 1–7: Baseball: Caribbean Series in San Juan, Puerto Rico
- August 17 – The Mexican Baseball Hall of Fame cancels its 2020 induction ceremony until 2021.
- September 11 to 20 – 2020 Women's Baseball World Cup in Monterrey

=== Basketball ===
- November (TBA): National Professional Basketball League (LNBP) season begins. Mexico City Capitanes join the NBA G League
- December (TBA): FIFA Club World Cup

=== Bicycling ===
- February 14 – Muevéte en Bici ("Move by bicycle") sponsors a night ride in Mexico City for Valentine's Day (Spanish: Día de Amor y Amistad).

=== Boxing, martial arts, and wrestling ===
- January 1 – Sin Piedad (2020) wrestling
- January 24 – La Noche de Mr. Niebla wrestling event in honor of the late Mr. Niebla.
- March 13
  - Rossy Velazquéz, 35, from Morelos fights María José "Leona" Favela from Baja California in Muay Thai and Grappling at Combate Americas in Tucson, Arizona, USA.
  - AAA vs MLW wrestling in Tijuana

=== Fishing and hunting ===
- July 16 to 18 – International Marlin and Tuna fishing tournament, Nuevo Vallarta, Jalisco

=== Golf ===
- February 17—23 – 2020 WGC-Mexico Championship won by Patrick Reed at Club Chapultepec in Mexico City
- June 17—21 – Mexican Pro Golf Tour final, Mayakoba Championship, Playa del Carmen, Quintana Roo
- November 9 – Carlos Ortiz wins the Houston Open. This is the first time a Mexican national has won a PGA tournament in 42 years.

=== Olympics ===
- January 15 – Laura Wilson wins a gold medal in mixed 3-on-3 ice hockey as part of the Yellow Team at the 2020 Winter Youth Olympics.

=== Tennis and racket sports ===
- February 17 to 23 – 2020 Morelos (tennis) Open, singles won by Jurij Rodionov; doubles won by Luke Saville and John-Patrick Smith.
- February 24 – 29: Acapulco Open Tennis Tournament, Acapulco, Guerrero
- February 24 to 29 – 2020 Abierto Mexicano Telcel tennis
  - Men's doubles won by Łukasz Kubot and Marcelo Melo
  - Women's singles won by Heather Watson
  - Women's doubles won by Desirae Krawczyk and Giuliana Olmos
- March 2 to 8 – tennis
  - 2020 Monterrey Challenger, singles won by Adrian Mannarino; doubles won by Karol Drzewiecki and Gonçalo Oliveira
  - 2020 Monterrey Open, singles won by Elina Svitolina; doubles won by Kateryna Bondarenko and Sharon Fichman

=== Track and Field, running, and jogging ===
- January 25 – Laura Galván wins the mile run at the "John Thomas Terrier Classic" at Boston University with a time of 4'31.89", a Mexican record.

== Births ==
- January 9 – Salomón Andrés López Adams, first grandchild of President López Obrador, born in Houston, Texas
- July 1
  - Teodoro Zedillo de la Vega, tenth grandchild of former president Ernesto Zedillo.
  - Eight Mexican gray wolf cubs of the endangered species C. l. baileyi are born at the Desert Museum in Saltillo, Coahuila.
- August 8 – An African elephant named "Zoom" is born in Africam Safari in Valsequillo, Puebla.
- August 18 – An unnamed white tiger cub weighing 1 kilogram (2.2 lb) is born at the Culiacán zoo.
- December 1 – An unnamed black jaguar puppy is born at the Mérida zoos, Centenario and Animaya.

== Deaths ==
=== January ===
- January 2 – Minerva 'N', 42, is the first victim of femicide of the year, in Aquismón, San Luis Potosí; stabbed.
- January 3
  - Andrea Arruti, 21, voice actress, dubbed ('Sid Chang') in The Loud House and The Casagrandes, and ('Izzy') in Jake and the Neverland Pirates; Asthma
  - Alicia Salgado, nurse union leader (Sindicato Nacional de Trabajadores del Instituto de Seguridad y Servicios Sociales de los Trabajadores del Estado de México); tortured to death (body found on this date)
- January 4
  - Félix Alberto Linares, mayor of Ocuilan, State of Mexico; an ultra-light plane crash.
  - Enrique Montero Ponce, 91, journalist (XEHR) from Puebla
- January 5
  - Rubén Almanza, 90, Olympic basketball player (1952)
  - Felipe Antonio Díaz Zamora, Spanish chef in Tijuana, Baja California; murdered.
- January 6 – Sergio Fernández, 93, novelist (Los peces (1968) and Los desfiguros de mi corazón (1986)), essayist, and university professor (National Autonomous University of Mexico (UNAM))
- January 8
  - Jaime Rosas Quiñones, leader of the sugarcane union Confederación Nacional de Propietarios Rurales (CNPR) in Puebla, shot in Izúcar de Matamoros, Puebla. Carlos Valencia Camaño, 44, was also shot.
  - Gary Hirsch Meillón, legal representative of Marindustrias (a tuna fish company) and former local president of the Red Cross; shot in Manzanillo, Colima
- January 9 – Martín Alejandro Loera Trujillo, 18, student-athlete at Universidad Autónoma de Ciudad Juárez, Chihuahua; murdered
- January 10
  - María "Miss Mary" Assaf Medina, 50, English teacher at Colegio Cervantes in Torreón, Coahuila; murdered in a school shooting. The 11-year-old shooter and a 7-year-old girl also died.
  - José Javier Rodríguez Garza, Director of operations of Club de Fútbol Monterrey
- January 11
  - Jorge Cázares Campos, 82, landscape painter from Cuernavaca, Morelos
  - La Parka II (Jesus Alfonso Huerta Escoboza), Lucha Libre AAA Worldwide wrestler; renal complication (b. January 4, 1966)
- January 13
  - Carlos Alvarado Perea, 68, progressive rock musician; cancer (b. August 11, 1951)
  - Carlos Girón, 65, silver medal-winning diver in the 1980 Olympics
  - Jaime Humberto Hermosillo, 77, movie director (La tarea o María de mi corazón) in Aguascalientes
  - Maria Guadalupe Lopez Esquival "La Catina", 21, leader of the Jalisco New Generation Cartel (CJNG) in Tepalcatepec, Michoacan; killed in gun battle with state and federal security forces.
- January 14
  - Guillermo Ancira Elizondo, 57, businessman (b. 1962)
  - Chamín Correa El Requinto de Oro (the Golden Guitarist), 90, founder of Los Tres Caballeros (b. 1929)
  - Diego Alejandro Rentería ("El Pulpomo"), 39, radio announcer
- January 16 – Jorge Navarro Sánchez and Luis Gerardo Rivera, actors in the Televisa series No Fear of Truth died after falling from a bridge during filming near Mexico City.
- January 17
  - Members of the band Sensación murdered by "Los Ardillos" in Chilapa de Álvarez, Guerrero: Jose Julio (37), Crescenciano (37), Israel (24), Antonio (24), Candido (20), Lorenzo (32), Juan Joaquin (42), Marco (36), Regino (15), and Israel (15)
  - Eduardo Soar Nova López, 42, police officer killed while trying to stop a robbery in Cuernavaca
- January 18 – Isabel Cabanillas, 26, artist and activist in Ciudad Juárez
- January 23 – José "N", husband of alderman from Huimanguillo, Tabasco; murdered
- January 24
  - José Luis Castro Medellín, 81, Mexican Roman Catholic prelate, Bishop of Tacámbaro (2002–2014).
  - Carlos Garrido Gular, director del Instituto Tcnológico de Villa La Venta, Huimanguillo, Tabasco; murdered
- January 25 – Enrique Rovirosa Priego, businessman and rancher from Villahermosa, Tabasco; natural causes.
- January 28 – Narciso Elvira, 52, left-handed pitcher in the Mexican League (MLB), Milwaukee Brewers (MLB), Los Angeles Dodgers, and the Nippon Professional Baseball (NPB); murdered in Paso del Toro, Medellín de Bravo, Veracruz; murdered. His brother Abraham was wounded and his nephew Gustavo was also killed.
- January 29 – Homero Gómez González, 50, ecologist and president of Comité Administrador del Santuario El Rosario, a Monarch Butterfly Biosphere Reserve in Ocampo Municipality, Michoacán. He was last seen alive on January 20, and a spokesperson for the state human rights commission declared that he believes Gómez González was murdered by illegal forestry interests.
- January 30 – Miguel Arroyo, 53, road racing cyclist, National champion (2000), complications during surgery.

According to the Security Cabinet (Attorney General, Secretary of Security, Army, and Navy), there were 2,300 murders during the month of January 2020, with 104 on January 25. Other estimates put the figure over 3,000.

=== February ===
- February 1 – Raúl Hernández Romero, 44, tourist guide in Monarch butterfly sanctuaries in eastern Michoacan; he disappeared on January 27 and was found murdered on February 1. He was the second butterfly activist found murdered in less than a week.
- February 8
  - Humberto Rojas Landa ("Doctor Cosquillas"), 51, a clown doctor in Puebla; shot during a robbery.
  - Ingrid Escamilla Vargas, 25, a victim of femicide
- February 12
  - Javier Arevalo, 82, artist; heart failure.
  - Fatima Cecilia Aldrighett, 7, victim of femicide (body found on this date)
- February 17
  - Plácido Arango Arias, 88, businessman (b. 1931)
- February 18
  - Jaqueline Ramírez, 17, teenager from the Costa Grande of Guerrero, shot and tortured after she publicly accused the local police of harassment.
  - Aracely Alcocer Carmona ("Bárbara Greco"), radio journalist (La Poderosa) in Ciudad Juarez, Chihuauhua; shot
- February 29 – Luis Alfonso Mendoza, 55, Mexican dubbing and voice actor, shot.

=== March ===
- March 3
  - Sergio Estrada Cajigal Barrera, 88, historian and politician (PAN), interim mayor of Cuernavaca, Morelos (1990–1991), father of Morelos governor Sergio Estrada Cajigal Ramírez; health complications
  - Silvestre Frenk, 97, doctor (b. 1923)
- March 5 –
  - Alberto Mozas Fornos, 40, a Spanish citizen living in Zapopan, Jalisco; shot
  - Gilberto Villarreal Solís, 93, baseball player; coronavirus.
- March 6 – Magdaleno Mercado, 75, soccer player (Club Atlas, national team), (b. April 4, 1944)
- March 7
  - Aarón Alejandro Navarro Delgado ("Drago"), police commander in Tlaluac, Mexico City; shot
  - Alberto Méndez, Deputy police chief in Tarimoro, Guanajuato; shot
- March 8 – Nadia Veronica Rodriguez Saro Martinez, 23, student at Universidad Iberoamericana León; shot
- March 10 – Erik Juárez Blanquet, 30, Mexican teacher and politician, Deputy (2015–2018, 2018), shot.
- March 11 – Erick Juárez Blanquet, politician (PRD), member of Michoacan legislature; shot
- March 14 – Mariana Cecilia Aureliano Sixtos, 24, a student at UNAM who had been missing since March 12, found dead on this date
- March 16 – Pilar Luna, 75, underwater archaeologist (b. 1944).
- March 19 – Román Arámbula, 83–84, comic-book and storyboard artist (Mickey Mouse), heart attack.
- March 24 – Ignacio Trelles, 103, soccer player (Necaxa) and manager (Toluca, national team), heart attack.
- March 21 – Adrián Darío Rosales, producer and director
- March 25 – Soledad Alatorre, 94, labor activist (b. 1927)
- March 27 – Sergio González Gálvez, 86, lawyer and diplomat (b. 1934)
- March 29 – Gonzálo Curiel Larráinzar, 81, voice actor (b. 1929)
- March 30
  - Martha Avante Barrón, 94, Mexican singer and musician
  - Lorena Borjas, 59, Mexican-American transgender rights activist; COVID-19
  - María Elena Ferral, journalist in Papantla, Vercruz; murdered

There were 29 deaths as of March 31 due to the COVID-19 pandemic.

=== April ===
- April 1 – Gerardo Ruiz Esparza, 70, Secretary Communications and Transportation (SCT) (2012–2018); stroke (b. April 22, 1949)
- April 4 – Jerónimo Arango, 92–93, businessman (Walmart de México y Centroamérica)
- April 5 – Domingo Arturo García, 83, radio host (b. 1936)
- April 8 –
  - Obed Durón Gomez, mayor of Mahahual, Quintana Roo; shot
  - Patricia Mendoza, 72, photographer and art historian (b. 1948)
  - Adan Vez Lira, environmental rights activist; shot to death in Actopan, Veracruz
- April 11
  - Víctor Fernando Álvarez Chávez, 53, journalist in Guerrero; murdered (body found on this date)(b. July 27, 1969)
  - Adolfo Patrón Luján, 93, entrepreneur, art promoter and philanthropist (b. 1926)
  - Gus Rodríguez, 59, Mexican writer, director and video game journalist; lung cancer (b. May 27, 1958)
- April 12 – Jaime Ruiz Sacristán, 70, businessman and head of the Mexican Stock Exchange; COVID-19.
- April 14 – Ignacio Pichardo Pagaza, 84, politician, Governor of the State of Mexico (1989–1993) and President of the Institutional Revolutionary Party (1994); complications from surgery
- April 15 – Eric Mergenthaler, 56, Olympic sailor (1984, 1988, 1992), and world champion (1992); bicycle accident
- April 18
  - Alejandro Algara, 92, lyric tenor (b. 1928)
  - Amparo Dávila, 92, author and poet (Xavier Villaurrutia Award (1977)) The Houseguest and other stories (b. 1928)
- April 20 – Gabriel Retes, 73, filmmaker (Paper Flowers and Broken Flag), (b. March 25, 1947)
- April 21 – Gisleno Medina, 78, soccer player
- April 23 – José Luis Chávez Romero, sociologist and poet from Cuautla, Morelos; murdered
- April 24 – Juan Vlasco, 51, Mexican cartoonist (Marvel Comics); complications from appendicitis surgery
- April 25
  - Socorro Castro Alba, 85, mother of actress Verónica Castro
  - Arturo Huizar, 63, vocalist for Heavy Metal band Luzbel.
  - Jesús Memije, human rights advocate; shot in Coyuca de Benítez (municipality). His son was also killed.
- April 26
  - Tomás Balcázar, 88, soccer player (Guadalajara, national team); complications from a hernia operation
  - Aarón Hernán, 89, actor (The Garden of Aunt Isabel, Apolinar, Deathstalker and the Warriors from Hell)
- April 29 – Guido Münch, 98, Mexican astronomer and astrophysicist
- April 30
  - Óscar Chávez, 85, singer, songwriter (Por Ti and Se vende mi país) and actor (Los Caifanes); COVID-19
  - Jesús Oliva, musician (Mariachi Vargas de Tecalitlán) (n. 1932).

=== May ===
- May 1 – Tavo Limongi, 52, guitarist and singer (Resorte)
- May 2
  - Miguel Ángel García Tapia, journalist (El Sol de Cuernavaca); COVID-19
  - Carlos Andrés Navarro Landa, 33, arrested for disorderly conduct and then died in police custody, officially from a heart attack but covered with bruises from a beating.
- May 4 – José Luis Orendain Curiel, the first doctor in Nayarit to die of COVID-19
- May 5
  - Giovanni López Ramírez, 30, mason; beaten to death while in police custody in Ixtlahuacán de los Membrillos, Jalisco. His death set off violent demonstrations against police brutality.
  - Jaime Montejo, human rights activist in Mexico City; COVID-19
- May 6
  - Fabián Mauricio Toledo Aguilar, the first doctor in Morelos (IMSS and ISSSTE) to die of COVID-19
  - Agustín Villegas, 79, singer and composer (b. 1941)
- May 8
  - Moisés Escamilla May, 45, gangster (Los Zetas); COVID-19
  - Feminicide in Torreón, Coahuila: Cecilia Pérez Gutiérrez, 48, nurse; Araceli Pérez Gutiérrez, 59, nurse; and Dora Pérez Gutiérrez, 56, medical assistant; strangulation
- May 9 – Héctor Martínez Serrano, 86, radio host (b. 1933)
- May 12
  - Miguel Barbachano Ponce, 90, playwright and screenwriter (b. 1930)
  - Paloma Cordero, 83, First Lady of Mexico (1982–1988) (b. February 21, 1937)
- May 13
  - Alejandro Huerta Barreto, union leader (Confederación Nacional de Productores Rurales) and his nephew Juan Machucho, in Tezonapa, Veracruz; shot
  - Emigdio Moreno Cossío, father of Alejandro Moreno Cárdenas, president of the Institutional Revolutionary Party.
  - Gustavo Nakatani Ávila ("Yoshio"), 60, singer; (COVID-19) (b. 1959)
- May 14 – Guillermo "Jorge" Santana, 68, guitarist (Malo and The Fania All-Stars)
- May 15 – Luis Alfonzo Robles Contreras, politician, mayor of Magdalena de Kino, Sonora; shot during crossfire by narcos.
- May 16
  - José Rodrigo Aréchiga Gamboa ("El Chino Ántrax"), gangster; shot in Culiacan His sister, Ada Jimena Arechiga Gamboa, was murdered in a separate incident.
  - Jorge Armenta Ávalos, journalist, director of media outlet Medios Obson in Ciudad Obregón, Sonora; shot. A police officer was also killed and another wounded.
  - Pilar Pellicer, 82, actress (The Life of Agustín Lara, Day of the Evil Gun, La Choca); COVID-19
- May 17 – Daniela Lázaro Ducoulombier, soccer player (Atlético San Luis); strangled with a rope (possible suicide)
- May 19 – Alvaro Echeverria Zuno, 71, son of former president Luis Echeverría; suicide
- May 21 – Alfonso Isaac Gamboa Lozano, 39, former head of Unidad de Política y Control Presupuestal of SHCP; shot along with four other members of his family in Temixco, Morelos
- May 23 – Armando Acosta, 39, voice actor (Spock in ′′Star Trek: Discovery′′); COVID-19
- May 28
  - Robert M. Laughlin, anthropologist and preserver of the Maya language
  - Charlie Monttana "El vaquero rocanrrolero", 58, urban rock singer; heart attack
- May 31 – Oswaldo García Vallejo, head of public safety in Jalostotitlán, Jalisco; shot

=== June ===
- June 2 – Héctor Suárez, 81, actor and comedian, father of Héctor Suárez Gomís
- June 3
  - Francis Anel Bueno Sánchez, 38, politician MORENA, local deputy from Ixtlahuacán, Colima; kidnapped on April 29, body found June 3—shot
  - Ángel Fuentes Olivares, lawyer, politician, former attorney general of Veracruz; stabbed
  - Héctor Ortega, 81, actor, director, and screenwriter
  - César Tovar Camargo, educator and politician in Hidalgo; COVID-19
- June 4
  - Marco Alberto Corona Baltazar, acting warden of the penitentiary in Puente Grande, Jalisco; shot
  - Rodolfo García (‘Matemático II‘), 54, wrestler; COVID-19
- June 7 – Manuel Felguérez Barra, 91, abstract artist (b. 1928)
- June 9
  - Alexander Martínez Gómez, 16, soccer player, murdered by cops
  - Cira, La Morena, chef in Acapulco
- June 10
  - Rosita Fornés, 97, Cuban American singer who starred in several movies during the Golden Age of Mexican cinema; emphysema
  - Antonio González Orozco, 87, Mexican muralist, cancer.
- June 11 – José Luis Castillo Trejo, journalist, owner of ′′Máxima prioridad′′ in Ciudad Obregón, Sonora; murdered
- June 14
  - Aarón Padilla Gutiérrez, 77, soccer player (Pumas UNAM and Mexico national football team 1966, 1970); Alzheimer and COVID-19
- June 15 – Jorge Rubio, 75, baseball player (California Angels).
- June 16 – Uriel Villegas Ortiz, judge, and his wife; murdered
- June 18
  - Arturo Chaires, 83, footballer (C.D. Guadalajara, national team).
  - Jorge Humberto Arellano, politician (Morena), mayor of Acaponeta, Nayarit; COVID-19.
- June 21
  - Sergio Salvador Aguirre Anguiano, 77, Mexican jurist, associate justice of the Supreme Court (1995–2012), stomach cancer.
  - Reynaldo Salazar, 65, taekwondo player and coach (b. 1955)
- June 24
  - Armando Cardona Sánchez, 30, musician, member of La Séptima Banda; coronavirus.
  - Four mariachi players drown in a storm in Juárez, Nuevo León:
  - Raúl Casares G. Cantón, 82, entrepreneur, promoter of culture and philanthropy (b. 1938)
  - Alexis Ángel Corona Sánchez, 17; Alejandro Corona, 59, and Javier Salas Navarro, 44
- June 25 – Joel Negrete Barrera, politician MORENA from Abasolo, Guanajuato; murdered
- June 28
  - Rudolfo Anaya, 85, writer (b. 1937)
  - Manuel Donley, 92, Mexican-born American Tejano singer and musician.

=== July ===
- July 2 – Teodoro Enrique Pino Miranda, 73, Roman Catholic prelate, Bishop of Huajuapan de León (since 2000).
- July 4 – Sebastián Athié, 24, actor (011CE)
- July 8
  - José Antonio Pérez Sánchez, 72, Roman Catholic bishop (b. 1947).
- July 9
  - Marlene Catzín Cih, 66, politician, mayor of Maxcanú, Yucatan (1994–1995, 2010–2012, since 2018); COVID-19.
  - Sylvia Martínez Elizondo, 72, politician, Senator from Chihuahua (2016–2018) (PAN).
- July 12
  - Raymundo Capetillo, soap opera actor; COVID-19
  - Francisco Javier Fierro Torres, teacher and politician in Choix, Sinaloa; murdered
  - Abel González Rojas, 30, police officer in Almoloya de Juárez, State of Mexico; shot. His two minor sons were also killed.
- July 13 – Angie Michelle Vera; from San Andrés Cholula, Puebla; femicide (body found on this date)
- July 20 – Guillermo Salvador Boyzo González, adjunct general direct of the Foreign Ministry; COVID-19
- July 24
  - Úrsula Mojica Obrador, 69, cousin of President Andrés Manuel López Obrador; COVID-19
  - Jesús Rodríguez de Hijar, 91, musician, composer and arranger (b. 1929).
  - Ana Lucía Rupprecht, Swiss-Mexican child who could not get medicine in Mexico; leukemia
- July 24 – Claudio Zupo, 35, judoka, known as El gigante de Sonora ("the giant from Sonora") (b. 1984); coronavirus.
- July 26
  - Rafael Barraza Sánchez, 91, Roman Catholic bishop (b. 1928).
  - José Kuri Harfusch, businessman (Inbursa, Minera Frisco); COVID-19

17,672 people died of SARS-CoV-2 virus in July, an average of 589 people per day. An excess of 130,000 deaths, 55%, were reported between April and July 2020, compared to the same time period in 2019. Only 51,000 of these were officially attributed to COVID-19.

=== August ===
- August 1 – José Vicente Anaya, 73, writer, poet and cultural journalist.
- August 3 – Pablo Morrugares, journalist (P.M Noticias Guerrero web site) and his police bodyguard; murdered
- August 4 – José Luis Ibáñez, 87, university professor, screenwriter and film and theater director (b. 1933).
- August 5 – Tony Camargo, 94, singer (b. 1926).
- August 9 – Manrique Mezquita Tadeo, 36, cable television installer in San Marcos Tlacoyalco, Puebla; lynched after being falsely accused of child-kidnapping.
- August 10
  - Oscar Baylón Chacón, 91, politician (PRI: Federal senator and Governor of Baja California) and agronomist; stroke.
  - Ricardo Melgar Bao, 74, professor, historian and anthropologist (b. 1946).
- August 11
  - Luis Miranda Cardoso, father of Luis Enrique Miranda Nava, former Secretary of SEDESOL; murdered
  - Jonathan Santos, 18, Zapopan, Jalisco; shot in the head. His death raises concerns about homophobic hate crimes in Mexico. (Body found on this date)
- August 12 – Monica Miguel, television actress and director.
- August 12 – Enrique Robinson Bours, 93, businessman (Bachoco, Megacable) (n. 1927).
- August 15 – Mercedes Barcha, 87, widow of Colombian writer Gabriel García Marquez.
- August 16 – Rodrigo Abed Macías, 17, Jujutsu athlete in Oaxaca; killed.
- August 16 – Elsy Michelle "N," 12, of Tala, Jalisco; raped and killed, suspected feminicide (body found on this date).
- August 17
  - Norberto Ángeles, 43, businessman and former soccer player (Cruz Azul and 2001 Copa Libertadores Finals); heart attack.
  - Héctor Mickeith, 25, YouTuber, musician and actor
  - Lauro Quiroz Amador, police chief of intelligence for Quintana Roo; COVID-19.
- August 18
  - Mario Quintana, police officer who arrested the mastermind behind the July 26 attack on Omar García Harfuch in Mexico City; COVID-19.
  - Andrés Terrones Martínez ("El Chaparrito de Oro"), 87, musician (La Sonora Santanera de Carlos Colorado).
- August 19 – Armando Gaytan ("Mucha Crema"), wrestling announcer.
- August 20 – Herón Sarabia Mendoza, politician (Morena), in Tlapehuala, Guerrero; shot along with another person.
- August 21 – Pedro Nájera Pacheco, 91, soccer player (Club América, 1954 FIFA World Cup, 1962 FIFA World Cup).
- August 22
  - Juan Nelcio, independent journalist in Coahuila (Velador TV); murdered while in police custody.
  - Danna, 16, of Mexicali, Baja California; shot (body burned after death).
- August 23 – Miguel Antonio Vázquez, politician, municipal president of General Felipe Ángeles, Puebla; COVID-19.
- August 24
  - Victorino Gómez Martínez, politician, municipal president of San Bartolomé Quialana, Tlacolula District, Oaxaca; COVID-19. He was the 19th municipal president to die of the virus.
  - Sergio Tolano Lizárraga, union leader (Sección 65 del Sindicato Minero Nacional); injuries related to a fall off a horse.
- August 25 – Federico Aparicio Calixto, indigenous healer, disappeared while looking for his son in Metlatónoc, Guerrero; shot (body found on this date).
- August 26 – Cristian Trinidad, nurse last seen in Huixquilucan on July 17 (body found August 26).
- August 28
  - Manuel Torres Compeán, 71, boxer (n. 1941).
  - Manuel "El Loco" Valdés, 89, comedian; skin cancer.
- August 30
  - Horacio Alvarado Ortiz, 95, television personality (Reportajes de Alvarado).
  - Tomás Primo Negrete Chavarria, municipal president of Tonanitla; COVID-19.
  - Cecilia Romo, 74, actress, mother of Claudia Romo Edelman; COVID-19.
  - Elisa Vargaslugo Rangel, 97, writer and researcher at the UNAM (Premio Nacional de Ciencias y Artes, 2005).

2,973 homicides were reported in Mexico in August 2020, a 0.67% increase over 2019.

=== September ===
- September 2 – Wanda Seux (Juana Amanda Seux Ramírez), 72, Paraguayan-born actress; multiple illnesses.
- September 7
  - Xavier Ortiz, 48, singer (Garibaldi) and actor; suicide by hanging.
  - Luis Zárate, 79, Mexican Olympic cyclist (1960).
- September 9 – Julio Valdivia, journalist (El Mundo de Veracruz); decapitated.
- September 11 – "Taboo", wrestler, brother of La Parka II.
- September 12 – José Luis Espinosa (gym owner), 64; COVID-19.
- September 16 – Miguel Acundo González, politician PES, Deputy (LXIV Legislature of the Mexican Congress) from Puebla; COVID-19
- September 21 – Julián Cardona, 59–60, photojournalist.
- September 22 – Fulgencio Sandoval Cruz, model for Nezahualcóyotl and Cuauhtémoc on the MXN $50,000 and $100 bills.
- September 23 – Pedro Modesto Santos, municipal president of Santa Cruz Xitla, Oaxaca; COVID-19.
- September 24
  - Francisco Bonilla, boxing coach (Olympics of 2000 and 2016).
  - Carmen Vazquez, social leader ("Los Cholos") in Zacateas; murdered.
- September 25 – Amalia Magdalena Aguirre Álvarez, 55, doctor, director of IMSS hospital #66 in Apodaca, Nuevo León; COVID-19
- September 28 – Rubén Anguiano, 64, footballer (Zacatepec, Atlante, national team); COVID-19.

=== October ===
- October 7 – Mario Molina, 77, chemist, Nobel Prize laureate (1995); heart attack.
- October 14 – Armando Herrera, 84, Olympic basketball player (1960, 1964).
- October 15 – Mauricio Mata, 81, Olympic cyclist (1960).
- October 18 – Principe Aereo, 26, pro wrestler.
- October 21 – Paul Leduc, 78, film director (Frida Still Life, Reed: Insurgent Mexico).
- October 24 – Joel Molina Ramírez, 75, politician MORENA, Senator (since 2019); COVID-19.
- October 27 – Pedro Cervantes, 87, sculptor.
- October 29
  - Arturo Alba Medina, 49, journalist (Multimedios Televisión); shot.
  - Arturo Rivera, 75, painter; cerebral hemorrhage.
- October 31 – Arturo Lona Reyes, 94, Roman Catholic prelate, Bishop of Tehuantepec (1971–2001); COVID-19.

=== November ===
- November 2 – Jesús Alfonso Piñuelas Montes, independent camera-operator in Cajeme, Sonora; killed.
- November 5
  - Mariano Francisco Saynez Mendoza, 78, admiral, Secretary of the Navy (2010–2012).
  - Luis Zapata, 69, writer.
- November 6 – Adriana Murrieta Treviño, 29, Sonoran influencer who promoted marijuana by-products; strangled.
- November 8 – Víctor Valencia de los Santos, 61, politician PRI, Deputy (2006–2008); COVID-19.
- November 9
  - Bianca Alejandrina Lorenzana Alvarado (Alexis), 20, of Cancun, Quintana Roo; killed and dismembered (body found on this date). The police violently repressed protests following her death.
  - Israel Vázquez, 33, journalist (El Salmantino) from Salamanca, Guanajuato; shot.
- November 10
  - Isidro Pedraza Chávez, 61, politician PRD, Senator (2006–2009, 2012–2015), COVID-19.
  - Florisel Ríos Delfín, politician PRD, municipal president of Jamapa, Veracruz; murdered.
- November 13 – Miguel Hernández, 48, actor ("Agapito Melo" in Cero en Conducta).
- November 16
  - Javier Miranda, singer (imitator of Juan Gabriel); COVID-19.
  - Abdiel Alexey, 18; roller-coaster accident at Six Flags México.
- November 17 – Samuel Rodríguez Mora, politician (Director of Protocol of the Chamber of Deputies); COVID-19.
- November 18 – Candelaria Beatriz López Obrador, 56, teacher, sister of President Andrés Manuel López Obrador.
- November 20 – Ernesto Canto, 61, racewalker (gold medal, 20 km walk in the 1984 Summer Olympics); cancer.
- November 21
  - Maleni Morales, 45, actress (Los ricos también lloran); lung cancer.
  - Sofía Alejandra N., 12, of Fresnillo, Zacatecas; femicide (body found on this date).
  - David Suayfeta, doctor at IMSS in Zacatepec, Morelos; burned to death when an explosive device is thrown at his car.
- November 22 – Gonzalo Galván Castillo, 69, Roman Catholic prelate, Bishop of Autlán (2004–2015).
- November 23 – Juan Carlos Padilla Aranda, 54, seller of tamales in Celaya; killed by police.
- November 24 – Juan de Dios Castro Lozano, 78, lawyer and politician, President of the Chamber of Deputies (2003–2004) and MP (1979–1985, 1991–2000, 2003–2006); COVID-19.
- November 25
  - Pedro Gutiérrez Farías, 79, Catholic priest, founder of orphanages in Salamanca, Guanajuato and Morelia, accused child abuser; COVID-19.
  - José Manuel Mireles Valverde, 62, paramilitary leader; COVID-19.
  - Flor Silvestre, 90, singer ("Cielo rojo"), actress (The Soldiers of Pancho Villa, Ánimas Trujano) and equestrienne.
- November 26 – Benjamín Jiménez Hernández, 82, Roman Catholic prelate, Bishop of Culiacán (1993–2011).

=== December ===
- December 1 – Luis César Aguirre, musician.
- December 5 – Raúl Iragorri Montoya, Cuernavaca businessman (Nissan Cuernavaca) and politician MORENA (Congress of Morelos 1976-1979 and 2003–2006); COVID-19.
- December 6 – Jaime Camil Garza, Acapulco businessman and father of actors Jaime Camil and Issabela Camil.
- December 8
  - Yuri de Gortari Krauss, 69, chef (co-founder Escuela de Gastronomía Mexicana).
  - Sandra Ibeth Ochoa García, professor in Instituto Politécnico Nacional; feminicide.
- December 13
  - Edgardo del Villar, 51, Mexican television journalist, cancer.
  - David Adrián Salas Carreón, student at Meritorious Autonomous University of Puebla (BJUP). He is the fourth BJUP student murdered this year.
- December 14
  - Fernando Coello Pedrero, grandfather of Senator Manuel Velasco Cuello of Chiapas.
  - José María de la Torre Martín, 68, Roman Catholic prelate, Bishop of Aguascalientes (since 2008); COVID-19.
  - Amalia Alejandra Solórzano Bravo, cousin of Cuauhtémoc Cárdenas Solórzano and granddaughter of Juan de Dios Bátiz Paredes (IPN).
- December 17
  - "Doctor" Alfonso Morales, 71, sportscaster (TUDM); renal deficiency.
  - Ernesto Yañez, actor (Pastorela and Principio y fin); COVID-19.
- December 18 – Jorge Aristóteles Sandoval Díaz, 46, politician PRI, Governor of Jalisco (2013–2018); assassinated.
- December 19 – Alberto Valdés Jr., 70, equestrian, Olympic bronze medallist (1980).
- December 20
  - Delfino López Aparicio, 60, politician, Deputy (since 2018); COVID-19.
  - Florencio Olvera Ochoa, 87, Roman Catholic prelate, Bishop of Cuernavaca (2002–2009).
- December 21
  - Juan Bustillos Orozco, businessman and journalist (Impacto); suicide.
  - Gilberto Ensástiga Santiago, Mexico City politician; COVID-19.
  - Irene Ramiro Mora, 36, and Natividad Parra Ramiro, 13, of Zacapoaxtla; feminicide (bodies found on this date).
  - Efrén Valois Morales, politician MORENA (precandidate for mayor of Pilcaya); shot.
  - Alejandro Abisay, 26, from Puebla; femicide.
- December 22 – Rubén Tierrablanca Gonzalez, 68, Mexican-born Turkish Roman Catholic prelate, Apostolic Vicariate of Istanbul (since 2016); COVID-19.
- December 24
  - Benedicto Bravo, 58, footballer (Club León, Unión de Curtidores); COVID-19.
  - Armando Romero, 60, footballer (Cruz Azul, Toluca, Correcaminos UAT, Atlético Morelia and Zacatepec); COVID-19
- December 27
  - Florentino Domínguez Ordoñez, politician (PRI), Secretary of Public Education of Tlacala, former federal deputy; COVID-19.
  - Antonio Velasco Piña, 85, Mexican novelist, spiritual writer and essayist.
- December 28
  - Othón Cuevas Córdova, 55, Mexican politician, Deputy (2006–2009); COVID-19.
  - Josefina Echánove, 93, soap opera actress (two Ariel Awards, La Dueña (b. New York, July 21, 1928).
  - Armando Manzanero, 85, singer and composer (Grammy Lifetime Achievement Award 2014); heart attack provoked by COVID-19 (b. 1935).
  - Luis Enrique Mercado, 68, writer, journalist (El Economista) and politician, Deputy (2009–2012); COVID-19.
  - Juan José Reyes, 65, literary critic and author (La música para niños en México: una crónica) (b. 1955).
  - Cristy Mary Villegas Juarez, 15, from Juchitepec, State of Mexico; femicide (body found on this date).
- December 29 – Miguel Ángel Gutiérrez Machado, 60, politician, Deputy (2003–2006); COVID-19.
- December 30
  - Joel Higuera Acosta, musician (Los Tucanes de Tijuana); heart attack.
  - Martha Navarro, 83, actress (nominated for Ariel Award for Best Actress in 1989 for El Jinete de la Divina Providencia).
  - Otto Schöndube, 84, archaeologist.

== See also ==
=== Country overviews ===
- Mexico
- History of Mexico
- History of modern Mexico
- Outline of Mexico
- Government of Mexico
- Politics of Mexico
  - Fourth Transformation
- Years in Mexico
- Timeline of Mexico history

=== Crime ===
- Colegio Cervantes shooting
- Mexican drug war
- Murder of Fátima Cecilia
- Murder of Ingrid Escamilla
- List of George Floyd protests outside the United States

=== Related timelines for current period ===
- 2020
- COVID-19 pandemic in Mexico
- 2019–2020 dengue fever epidemic
- 2020 in politics and government
- 2020 in the Caribbean
- 2020 in Central America
- 2020 in Guatemala
- 2020 in the United States
- 2020 in United States politics and government
- 2020s
- 2020s in political history
- 2020 in archaeology
- 2020 in architecture
