= Venadito =

Venadito might refer to:

- Spanish cruiser Conde del Venadito, Spanish Navy ship
- Juan Ruiz de Apodaca, 1st Count of Venadito, Spanish nobleman
- Venadito Bravo, Mexican footballer
