= Antonio González Orozco =

Mexican muralist (1933–2020)

- Born: May 10, 1933; Chihuahua, Mexico
- Died: June 10, 2020 (aged 87); Mexico City, Mexico
- Education: Academy of San Carlos
- Occupation: Muralist
- Spouse: Mercedes Arriaga Rivera

Antonio González Orozco (May 10, 1933 – June 10, 2020) was a Mexican muralist.

== Life ==
Orozco was born on May 10, 1933, in Chihuahua. He was trained by Diego Rivera at the Academy of San Carlos in the 1950s.

Orozco painted murals at the National Palace. He also restored Chapultepec Castle in Mexico City, where he painted two new murals. He exhibited his work in Mexico and internationally.

Orozco died of cancer on June 10, 2020, in Mexico City, at age 87.
