= Sylvia Martínez Elizondo =

Mexican politician (1947–2020)

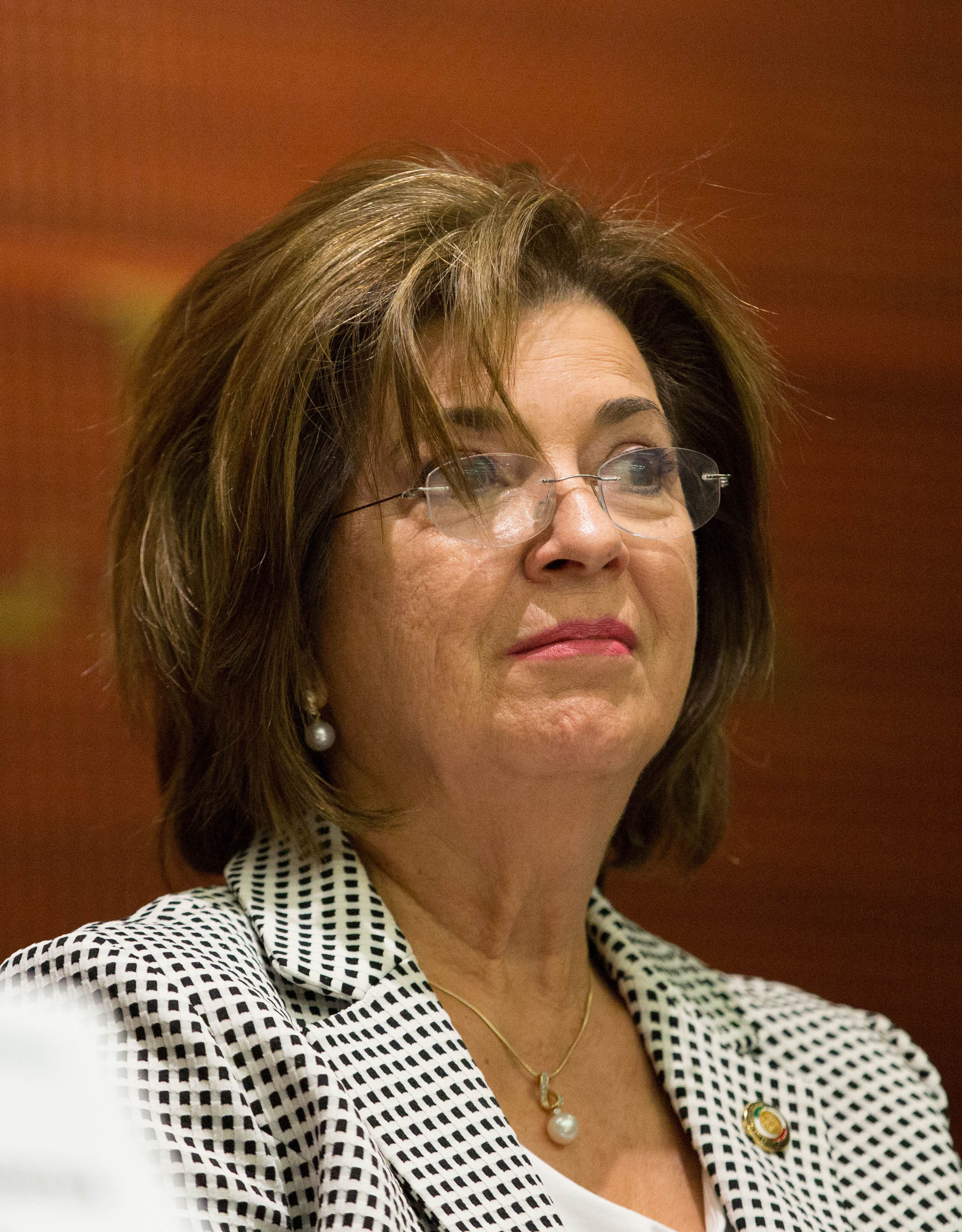

Member of the Senate of the Republic from Chihuahua
- In office February 23, 2016 – August 31, 2018

Personal details
- Born: 20 November 1947 Chihuahua City, Chihuahua, Mexico
- Died: 9 July 2020 (aged 72) Monterrey, Nuevo León, Mexico
- Party: National Action Party (PAN)
- Occupation: politician

Sylvia Leticia Martínez Elizondo (20 November 1947 – 9 July 2020) was a Mexican politician. She was a member of the National Action Party. She was Senator during the LXIII Legislature of the Mexican Congress, from 2016 until 2018.

Martínez Elizondo died in Monterrey on 9 July 2020, aged 72.
