= Dos Bocas, Tabasco =

Dos Bocas
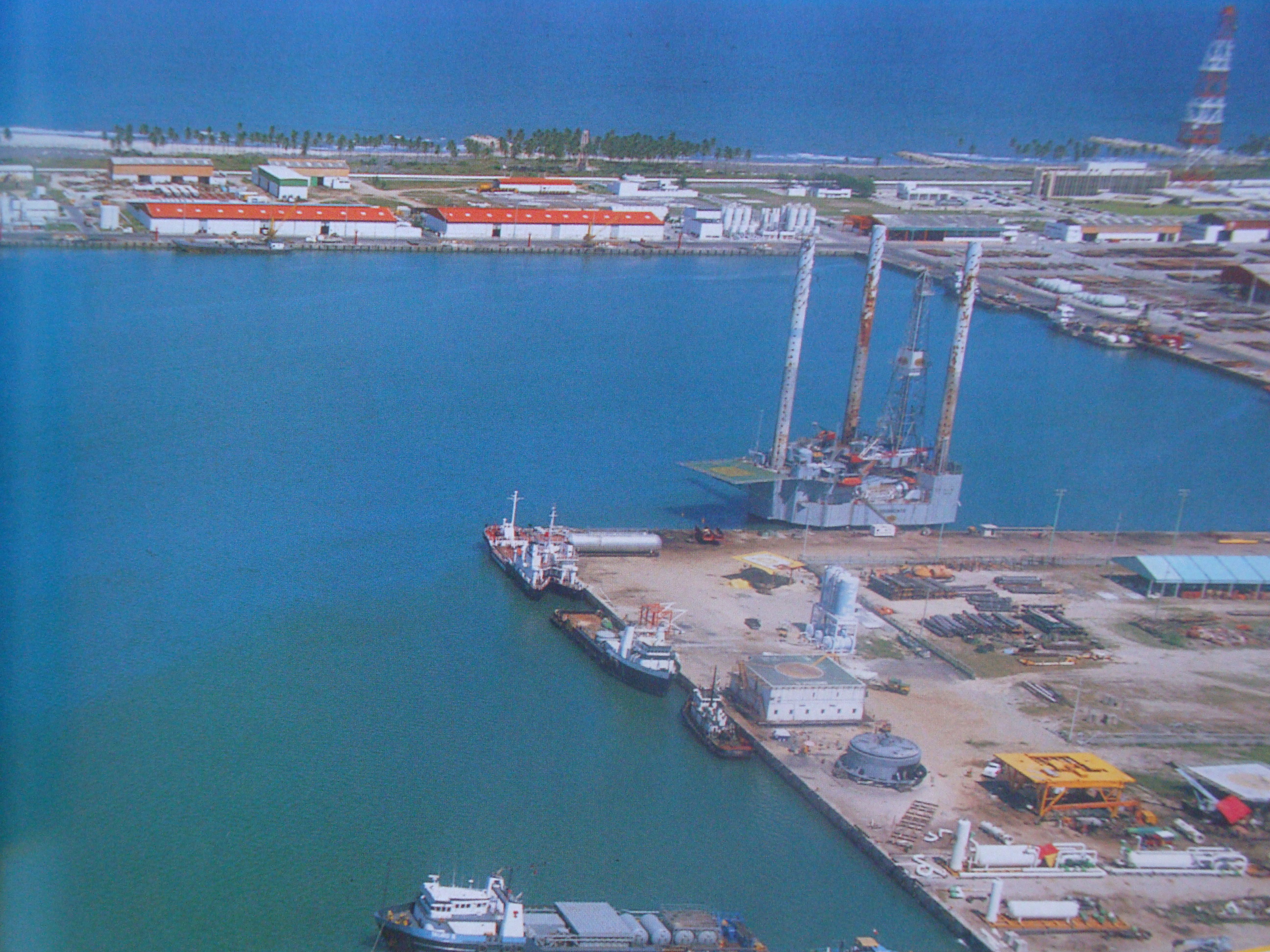
- Port of Dos Bocas (2010)
- Click on the map for a fullscreen view
- Dos Bocas (Mexico)

Location
- Country: Mexico
- Location: Tabasco
- Coordinates: 18°26.03′N 93°11.77′W
- UN/LOCODE: MXDBT

Details
- No. of berths: 11
- Draft depth: 28.0 metres (91.9 ft)

Statistics
- Website puertodosbocas.com.mx

The Port of Dos Bocas is a port facility located on Mexico's Atlantic coast, including a major single buoy mooring crude oil export facility. It is located on the Gulf of Campeche, about 60 nautical miles ENE of Coatzacoalcos, Veracruz, in the municipality of Paraíso, Tabasco.

One of Mexico's main crude oil ports, Dos Bocas also handles dry bulk, breakbulk and cruise vessels.
