= Gisleno Medina =

Uruguayan footballer and manager (1941–2020)

Personal information
- Full name: Gisleno Julián Medina Leites
- Date of birth: October 29, 1941
- Place of birth: Montevideo, Uruguay
- Date of death: April 20, 2020 (aged 78)
- Place of death: Cuernavaca, Mexico
- Position: Centre forward

Senior career*
Years	Team	Apps	(Gls)
1960–1964	Cerro		
1965–1966	Colón		
1967–1968	Cúcuta Deportivo		
1970–1972	Atlante		
1973	Zacatepec		

International career
1963	Uruguay		

Managerial career
- 1975: Deportivo Morelos
- * Club domestic league appearances and goals

Gisleno Julián Medina Leites (29 October 1941 - 20 April 2020) was a Uruguayan football player and manager.

== Career ==
Born in Montevideo, Medina began playing football as a central forward in local side C.A. Cerro's youth system. He broke into the first team when the struggling club turned to its youth players to avoid relegation. Medina made four appearances for Uruguay at the 1963 Pan American Games.

In 1965, Medina and his younger brother, Orlando, joined Argentine second division side Club Atlético Colón. They helped the club win the Primera B title, achieving a historic promotion to the Primera División.

After enjoying success with Colón, Medina moved to Colombia where he joined Cúcuta Deportivo for the 1967–68 season. Soon after, he moved to Mexico, playing for Primera División sides Atlante F.C. and Atlético Zacatepec before being forced to retire after a medical team determined he only had one kidney.

After he retired from playing, Medina remained in Mexico where he would coach Deportivo Morelos.

In April 2020, Medina died in Cuernavaca, Mexico.
