= Arussi Unda =

Mexican feminist activist

Illustrated portrait of Arussi Unda.

Arussi Unda is a radical feminist advocate and spokesperson for Las Brujas del Mar from Veracruz, Mexico. She was named as one of the 100 Most Influential People of 2020 by Time magazine.

== History ==
Las Brujas del Mar (Witches of the Sea) began with a private group on Facebook. Discussing feminist topics, violence often came up, and women were asking for help. After the first time they helped remove a woman from a violent home, the organization began to take shape.

Arussi Unda helped organize the National Women's Strike on March 9, 2020, in Mexico, to protest and raise awareness of the increasing violence faced by women across the country. This occurred the day after International Women's Day.

Unda was on the list of the BBC's 100 Women announced on 23 November 2020.
