= Sergio Salvador Aguirre Anguiano =

Mexican jurist (1943–2020)

Associate Justice of the Supreme Court of Justice of the Nation
- In office 1 February 1995 – 30 November 2012

Sergio Salvador Aguirre Anguiano (1 February 1943 – 21 June 2020) was a Mexican jurist and Associate Justice (ministro) of the Supreme Court of Justice of the Nation.

Born in Guadalajara, Jalisco, Aguirre Anguiano studied law at the Autonomous University of Guadalajara (UAG). He served as a notary public and taught law at the university level. The only member of the Supreme Court with a party-political background, he was a candidate for the Chamber of Deputies for the National Action Party (PAN) and served as a member of the Guadalajara municipal council in 1985 and 1986.

He was nominated for the Supreme Court by President Ernesto Zedillo and confirmed by the Senate in January 1995; he took office on 1 February 1995 and served until 30 November 2012. He was perceived as belonging to the Court's conservative wing.
