= Murder of Isabel Cabanillas =

2020 murder of Mexican artist and activist

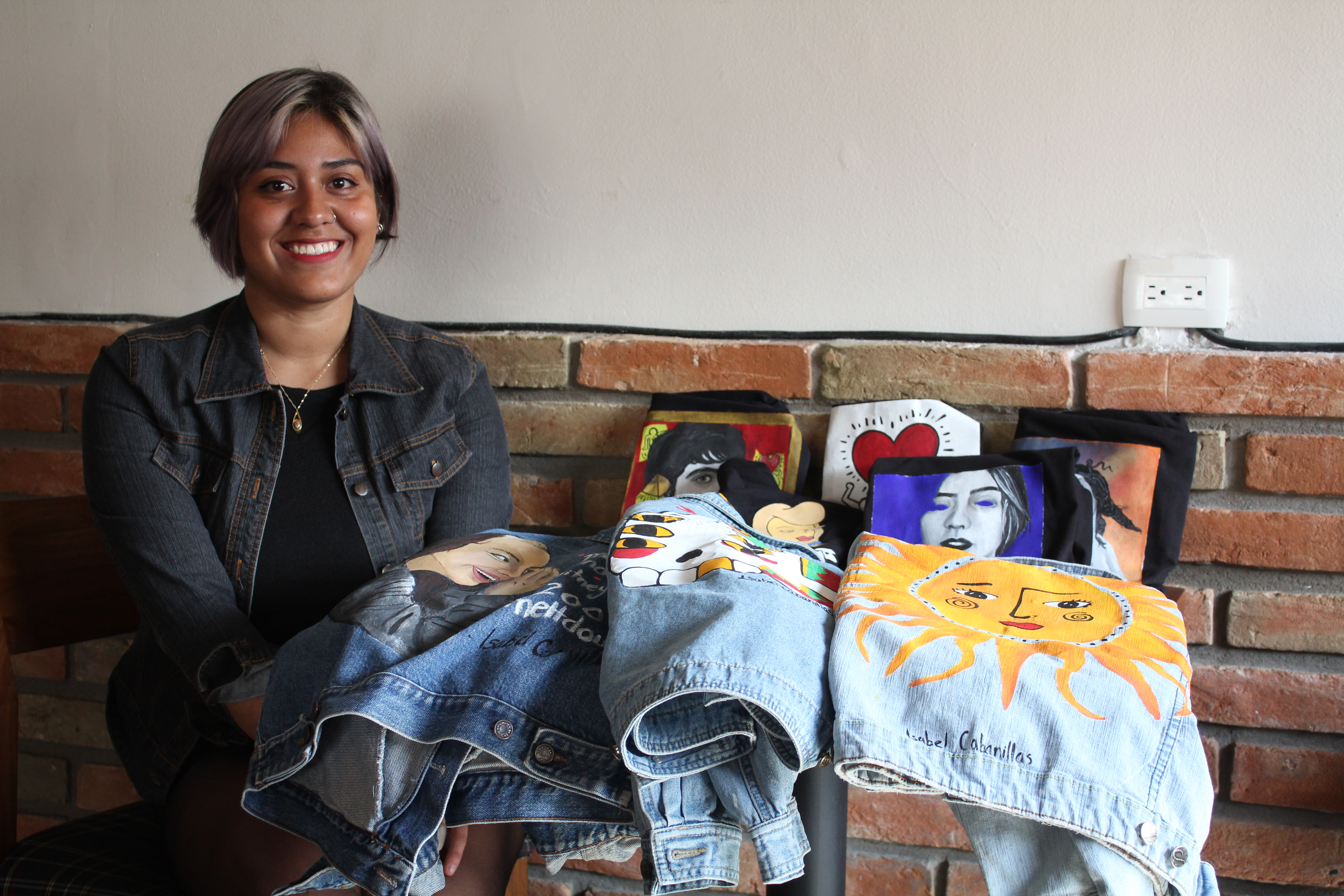
- Location: Ciudad Juárez
- Date: January 18, 2020

On January 18, 2020, Isabel Cabanillas de la Torre (May 5, 1993 – January 18, 2020), a mother, artist, and Women's Rights activist, was killed in Juarez City, Mexico after not returning home from a night out at a bar. As of January, 18 2022, there are still no suspects, nor is there an official account of what happened.

== Background ==
Cabanillas was a 26-year-old student at the Autonomous University of Juárez City (UACJ), where she studied fashion design and painting. She was also an activist with Mesa de Mujeres and the anti-capitalist, feminist collective, known as Hijas de su Maquilera Madre, with whom she protested femicides in the city.

== Events ==
On the night of Jan 17, 2020, Cabanillas was out at a bar in downtown Juarez. After leaving, she got on her bike to return home. Minutes later she was shot twice: once in the head and once in the chest. Her body was found next to her bicycle on a sidewalk around 3:00 a.m. on Jan 18, less than a quarter mile (350 m) away from the bar she had just left. Her friends realized she was missing the next day and took to social media to find her. Their posts assisted law enforcement in identifying Cabanillas' body.

Mexican law enforcement authorities launched an investigation, but as of Jan 18, 2022 there are no suspects. Authorities also determined that the motive for Cabanillas' death was unclear, while the Chihuahuan Women's Institute considers it a femicide.

== Aftermath ==
UACJ condemned the killing and called for justice. Protests were held throughout Mexico in her name. Cabanillas leaves behind a son.
