= Jaime Ruiz Sacristán =

Mexican businessman (1949–2020)

Chairman of the Mexican Stock Exchange
- In office January 1, 2015 – April 12, 2020
- Preceded by: Luis Téllez
- Succeeded by: Marcos Martínez Gavica

Personal details
- Born: October 27, 1949 Mexico City, Mexico
- Died: April 12, 2020 (aged 70) Mexico City, Mexico
- Spouse: Maribel
- Relations: Carlos Ruiz Sacristán (Twin brother)

Jaime Ruiz Sacristán (October 27, 1949 – April 12, 2020) was a Mexican businessman and banker. He was the chairman of the Mexican Stock Exchange (BMV) from 2015 until his death in 2020. His twin brother, Carlos Ruiz Sacristán, was the Secretary of Communications and Transportation of Mexico from 1994 to 2000.

== Biography ==
Ruiz received a bachelor's degree in business administration from Universidad Anáhuac México and an MBA from the Kellogg School of Management at Northwestern University in Evanston, Illinois.

In 2003, Ruiz founded the financial group Banco Ve por Más. He was appointed vice president of the Mexican Banking Association (ABM) in 2007 and was promoted to chairman of the banking association from 2011 until 2013. In 2015, Jaime Ruiz Sacristán became chairman of the Mexican Stock Exchange (Bolsa Mexicana de Valores) and remained in this position until his death in April 2020.

Sacristán tested positive, during the COVID-19 pandemic in Mexico for COVID-19 on March 13, 2020, after returning from a vacation to Vail, Colorado. Several other Mexican executives also tested positive for coronavirus following the same trip. He died from the virus at the Hospital Ángeles del Pedregal in Mexico City on April 12, 2020, at the age of 70.
