= Librado Silva Galeana =

Mexican translator and writer

Librado Silva Galeana (17 August 1942 – 24 April 2014) was a Mexican translator and writer, recognized as communicator of Nahuatl culture. He helped translate many texts from Nahuatl into Spanish and he wrote about the traditions of indigenous people of Mexico.

He was born in Santa Ana Tlacotenco in Milpa Alta to Nahuatl-speaking parents, who taught him their language. Initially, he studied to be a teacher but then studied at the National Autonomous University of Mexico, where he earned a degree in Latin-America studies.

Google dedicated a doodle to him on 17 August 2020.
