= 2020 Irapuato massacres =

Part of the Mexican drug wars

Irapuato massacres
- Location: Irapuato, Guanajuato, Mexico
- Date: 6 June 2020, 1 July 2020
- Attack type: Mass shooting
- Deaths: 38
- Injuries: 5
- Perpetrator: Drug gangs

Mass shootings occurred at drug rehabilitation centres in Irapuato, Guanajuato, Mexico, on 6 June and 1 July 2020.

On 6 June 2020, 10 men were killed at a centre.

Less than a month later, on the afternoon of 1 July, 28 people were killed and five others wounded at an unregistered centre.

== Background ==
The drug war in Mexico has been going on since 2007, and has worsened every year since 2016. The month of June 2020 saw a particularly bloody phase, where several attacks were carried out on an entire city scale, as well as mass killings, and coordinated arson. These abuses were mainly due to territorial clashes between the Jalisco New Generation cartels, Santa Rosa de Lima and different factions of the Sinaloa cartel, as well as reprisals by the Santa Rosa de Lima cartel after the arrest of family members of its leader José Antonio Yépez "El Marro" on June 20, 2020. 211 murders were perpetrated throughout Mexico during the weekend of June 6 and 7, including 117 on June 7, making it the most violent day of 2020.

Thus, the bodies of seven police officers who had disappeared in May were found in an abandoned car in the state of Colima on June 1; the city of Caborca (Sonora) was attacked and partially burned on June 19, 12 bodies were found. and on July 2, only one arsonist had been arrested; throughout the month of June at least 19 bodies of people executed sometimes after being tortured are found around Fresnillo (Zacatecas), and on June 26, clashes between Mexican law enforcement at all levels and the Sinaloa and Jalisco New Generation cartels broke out throughout the state and caused 26 deaths; On June 21, a local criminal group ambushed a convoy of indigenous Ikoots in the village of La Reforma (Oaxaca), killing 15 people, injuring 20 others and raping several women; On June 25, a series of territorial clashes around the villages of Tepuche and Tecolotes (Sinaloa) between different factions of the Sinaloa cartel and with the National Guard left 16 dead, and one of the narcos was arrested; On June 26, the Jalisco New Generation cartel carried out an attack in Mexico City against the head of the Federal District police, Omar García Harfuch, in which he was wounded but survived, and which caused a total of three deaths (two bodyguards and a passerby) and five injuries. In the following two days 28 people were detained, including the alleged sponsor José Armando N. "The Vaca."

The state of Guanajuato, where Irapuato is located, is particularly affected, because it is an area of confrontations between the Jalisco New Generation cartel and that of Santa Rosa de Lima. During the first four months of 2020, with 1,534 homicides, it was the state of Mexico that experienced the most violence. Especially since after the arrest of 26 members of the Santa Rosa de Lima cartel including members of the family of El Marro, its leader, on June 20, his group carried out many reprisals in Guanajuato, especially around the city of Celaya. Several roadblocks, dozens of arsons, several kidnappings of women, and several bomb attacks, successful or failed, were committed between June 21 and 30.

In the case of Irapuato, several detoxification centers have already been targeted in the previous months. The city has 265 centers, but only 30 are official and declared. In December 2019, 20 people were kidnapped in a center, in February 2020, another center was set on fire, and the first shooting took place in a detoxification center on June 6, which caused 10 deaths. A study by the Citizens' Council for Public Security and Criminal Justice ranked Irapuato as the fourth most dangerous city in the world in 2019, with 80 homicides per 100,000 inhabitants, which is the fourth highest homicide rate recorded in a city in the world that year, behind three other Mexican cities (Tijuana, Ciudad Juárez and Uruapan). At the time of the massacre, Irapuato was considered part of the territory of the Santa Rosa de Lima cartel, but increasingly contested by the Jalisco New Generation cartel.

== Massacre ==
On July 1, 2020, around 5:45 p.m., at least three armed men arrived aboard a red vehicle, of which no more precise details are known. They enter the clandestine detoxification center Buscando el Camino a mi Recuperación ("In Search of the Way of My Recovery") on Lerdo Street, a two-story building. On the ground floor, used by women, they threaten the occupants and force them to keep quiet. Then they go to the second floor, used by men, break down the door, and say they are looking for a particular person. When the patients say that these people are not here, the attackers force them to lie on the ground, then execute them. They then return to the ground floor, where they execute the 3 men who were there and injure 3 women, then leave. 24 people die on the spot and seven are injured. The attackers then flee in their vehicle before the arrival of the police.

== Victims ==
The next day, 4 people had died in the hospital, which brought the toll to 28 deaths and 3 injuries. All the dead are men, the wounded survivors are women. Subsequently, the toll was very slightly revised downwards with 27 deaths.

== Investigation ==
Investigators believe the massacre is linked to the territorial war between the Santa Rosa de Lima and Jalisco New Generation cartels. Authorities begin their investigation by searching for the vehicle in which the attackers arrived. On July 5, the Reaction and Intervention Task Force arrested three suspects. The suspects were identified using ballistic analyses, the hearing of the few witnesses, and the analysis of the video surveillance films compared to the robot portraits drawn thanks to the witnesses. One of the men arrested had already been arrested in the past and was known to the justice system for several crimes. On July 7, the prosecutor's office said it was looking for an individual nicknamed "El Muletas", an alleged member of the Jalisco New Generation Cartel, suspected of being involved in the massacre without having physically participated in it.

However, on July 6, the General Prosecutor's Office of the State of Guanajuato announced that the three suspects were part of a local criminal group operating in the Laja-Bajío area, an ally of the Santa Rosa de Lima Cartel, and who allegedly perpetrated the massacre on the orders of the latter's leader, El Marro. Investigations were also opened against the suspects for other acts committed in the days following the massacre.

== Trial ==
On July 13, 2020, the suspects passed for the first time before a judge of the General Prosecutor's Office of the State [of Guanajuato] where the charges against them were exposed. One of them, Jesús Emmanuel Quezada Martínez, is charged with homicide with aggravating circumstances on 27 people, and of 6 attempted homicides. The other two are accused of carrying illegal weapons and crimes against health. They are kept in pre-trial detention, where they are also at the disposal of the federal justice.

== Consequences ==
After the massacre, the Guanajuato government announced that it would identify the state detoxification centers to be able to set up security barriers in front of, in cooperation with the municipal and federal authorities.

On July 16, after a meeting, left-wing President (Morena) Andrés Manuel López Obrador and the right-wing government of Guanajuato (PAN) Diego Sinhue Rodríguez Vallejo agreed to put their political differences aside to better combat insecurity in Guanajuato, by better fighting theft and fuel trafficking, the main source of income of the Santa Rosa de Lima Cartel.

On July 24, 2020, José Guadalupe "El Mamey", one of the main lieutenants of this cartel was arrested in the city of Guanajuato. And on August 2, José Antonio Yépez "El Marro" was captured by the Mexican Army and transferred to a maximum security prison. However, the arrest warrant issued by a federal judge against him calls for his arrest for "fuel theft and organized crime" but not for the Irapuato massacre in particular. On October 4, 2020, the Secretary for Security and Citizen Protection of Mexico Alfonso Durazo Montaño announced that following this operation, the CSRL, already weakened for months by its fight against the New Generation Jalisco Cartel and by the improvement of the prevention of fuel trafficking by the federal government, was breaking down between several smaller groups, who were fighting to take control of the remains of the cartel and/or territories where it was located.

== Reactions ==
The governor of Guanajuato, Diego Sinhue Rodríguez Vallejo (PAN), who knew one of the victims, condemns the attack on social networks: "I deeply regret and condemn the events that occurred this afternoon in Irapuato. The violence generated by organized crime not only took the lives of these young people, but it also stole the peace of the Guanajuato families. [...] Today more than ever it is necessary to carry out a coordinated action of the federal and federated authorities as the only way to be able to face this situation and emerge victorious. [...] We are at work and we will not stop until calm has returned to Guanajuato. We have to get out of it with our heads held high."

The prosecutor of the State of Guanajuato, Carlos Zamarripa Aguirre, writes on Twitter: "I have appointed a specialized team to investigate and clarify this cowardly criminal act that has torn the Society. We will capture the culprits and deliver them to justice."

Mexican President Andrés Manuel López Obrador (Morena) said the government would not allow Mexico to "fall into anarchy and disorder."
