= Rubén Almanza =

Mexican basketball player (1929–2020)

Personal information
- Born: 28 July 1929; Chihuahua, Chihuahua, Mexico
- Died: 5 January 2020 (aged 90)

Sport
- Sport: Basketball

Rubén Almanza (28 July 1929 – 5 January 2020) was a Mexican basketball player. He competed in the men's tournament at the 1952 Summer Olympics.
