= Karime López =

Mexican chef (born 1982)

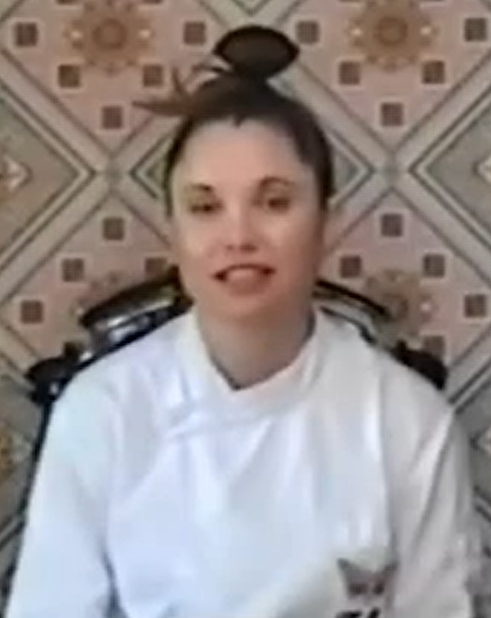
- In a 2020 video
- Born: 1982 (age 43–44); Mexico City, Mexico
- Occupation: Chef

Karime López (born 1982) is a Mexican chef working in Italy. In 2019, while helming the kitchen at Gucci Osteria in Florence, Italy, she became the first female chef from Mexico to help her restaurant earn a Michelin star. That same year, she was named Italy's Female Chef of the Year.

== Biography ==
Karime López was born in Mexico City in 1982. López first learned about cooking at home as a child, helping her mother prepare family meals at home in Querétaro, Mexico.

=== Culinary education ===
At age 18, López moved to Paris to study art. While in Paris, her attention shifted from art to culinary arts. In 2005, López moved to Seville, Spain to train as a chef. After her studies, she apprenticed under Santi Santamaria and later at top restaurants, including Can Fabes, Mugaritz, Pujol and Noma. López later described the challenges of pursuing a chef's career as a woman, and the difficulty of making sacrifices to travel far from home to learn from the world's top chefs.

=== Gucci Osteria ===
In 2017, López moved to Modena, Italy where her husband, Takahiko Kondo was the sous chef at Osteria Francescana. In 2018, Massimo Bottura offered her the position as head chef of Gucci Osteria in Florence. In 2019, the Michelin Guide awarded one star to Gucci Osteria. With the recognition, López became the first Mexican woman to lead a Michelin starred kitchen. In 2019, López was named Italy's Female chef of the year.

In 2022, Kondo joined López as co-head chef at Gucci Osteria, where the couple focused on dishes crafted with local produce. In 2023, López was awarded as the best Chef of Distinction Abroad by Mexico's National Chamber of Restaurants and Seasoned Foods, a national industry body representing the Mexican restaurant industry.
