= Gilberto Ensástiga =

Mexican politician (1963–2020)

- Born: 20 July 1963; Mexico City, Mexico
- Died: 21 December 2020 (aged 57)
- Occupation: Politician
- Political party: PRD

Gilberto Ensástiga Santiago (20 July 1963 – 21 December 2020) was a Mexican politician affiliated with the Party of the Democratic Revolution. As of 2014 he served as Deputy of the LIX Legislature of the Mexican Congress representing the Federal District.

He died from COVID-19 during the COVID-19 pandemic in Mexico.
