= Benedicto Bravo =

Mexican footballer (1962–2020)

Personal information
- Date of birth: 8 May 1962
- Place of birth: León, Guanajuato, Mexico
- Date of death: 24 December 2020 (aged 58)
- Place of death: León, Guanajuato, Mexico
- Positions: Defender; midfielder

Senior career*
Years	Team	Apps	(Gls)
1983	Unión de Curtidores		
1984–1994	Club León		
- * Club domestic league appearances and goals

Benedicto Bravo (8 May 1962 – 24 December 2020) was a Mexican professional footballer who played as a defender or midfielder.

== Career ==
Bravo played for Unión de Curtidores and Club León. He later worked for Club León as a coach and technical director.

He died at age 58 from COVID-19, during the pandemic in Mexico.
