= List of conflicts in the Americas =

This is a list of conflicts in the Americas. This list includes all present-day countries starting northward first from Northern America (Canada, Greenland, and the United States of America), southward to Middle America (Aridoamerica, Oasisamerica, and Mesoamerica in Mexico; and Central America over Panama, Belize, Costa Rica, El Salvador, Guatemala, Honduras, and Nicaragua), eastward to the Caribbean (Cuba, Haiti, Jamaica, Grenada, Saint Martin, the Dominican Republic, and the Republic of Trinidad and Tobago) and South America, in Argentina, Bolivia, Brazil, Chile, Colombia, Ecuador, Guyana, Paraguay, Peru, Suriname, Uruguay and Venezuela. Conflicts are also arranged chronologically starting from the Pre-Columbian era (the Lithic, Archaic, Formative, Classic, Post-Classic, and Colonial periods/stages of North America and Mesoamerica; c. 18000 BCE – c. 1821 CE) up to the post-colonial period (c. 1821 CE – present). This list includes any raid, strike, skirmish, siege, sacking, and/or battle (land, naval, and air) that occurred on the territories of what may today be referred to as falling within any of the aforementioned modern nations; however, in which the conflict itself may have only been part of an operation of a campaign in a theater of a greater war (e.g. any and/or all border, undeclared, colonial, proxy, liberation, global, Indian wars, etc.). There may also be periods of violent, civil unrest listed; such as, shootouts, spree killings, massacres, terrorist attacks, coups, assassinations, regicides, riots, rebellions, revolutions, and civil wars (as well as wars of succession and/or independence). The list might also contain episodes of human sacrifice, mass suicide, and ethnic cleansing/genocide.

== Northern America ==
Territorial evolution of North America of non-native nation states from 1750 to 2008.

=== Bermuda ===
As a British Colony Bermuda served as a staging point for Great Britain during the American Revolution and War of 1812. During the Battle of the Atlantic the island served as an allied airbase for Anti-submarine warfare submarine hunters. NATO also used Bermuda as a base during the Cold War.

=== Canada ===
==== 16th century ====
- 1534 Battle of Bae de Bic
- 1609–1924 American Indian Wars
- 1577 Skirmishes between English sailors under Martin Frobisher and Inuit on Baffin Island

==== 17th century ====
- 1600s Beaver Wars
  - 1610 Battle of Sorel
  - 1628 Action of 17 July 1628
  - 1644 Action at Ville-Marie
  - 1649 Raid on St. Ignace and St. Louis
  - 1660 Battle of Long Sault
  - 1689 Lachine massacre
  - 1691 Battle of La Prairie
  - 1692 Mohawk Valley raid
- 1600s Anglo-French conflicts
  - 1613 Battle of Port Royal
  - 1628 Capture of Tadoussac
  - 1628 Naval action in the St. Lawrence River
  - 1629 Capture of Quebec
  - 1629 Siege of Baleine
  - 1630 Siege of Fort St. Louis
  - 1632 Raid on St. John
  - 1640 Battle of Port Royal
  - 1654 Battle of Port Royal
  - 1686 Hudson Bay expedition
  - 1688 Battle of Fort Albany
- 1640–1701 French and Iroquois Wars
  - 1692 Battle of Fort Vercheres
- 1643–1650 Acadian Civil War
  - 1643 Battle of Port Royal
  - 1645 Battle of Fort La Tour
- 1674 Dutch Occupation of Acadia
- 1677 Battle of Port La Tour
- 1689–1697 King William's War
  - 1689 Battle of the Lake of Two Mountains
  - 1690 Battle of Coulée Grou
  - 1690 Battle of Port Royal
  - 1690 Battle at Chedabucto
  - 1690 Battle of Quebec
  - 1693 Battle of Fort Albany
  - 1694 Capture of York Factory
  - 1696 Naval action in the Bay of Fundy
  - 1696 Raid on Chignecto
  - 1696 Siege of Fort Nashwaak
  - 1696–1697 Avalon Peninsula Campaign
    - 1696 Siege of Ferryland
    - 1696 Raid on Petty Harbour
    - 1696 Siege of St. John's
    - 1697 Battle of Carbonear
  - 1697 Battle of Hudson's Bay

==== 18th century ====
- 1702–1713 Queen Anne's War

- 1702 Raid on Newfoundland
- 1704 Raid on Chignecto
- 1704 Raid on Grand Pré
- 1705 Siege of St. John's
- 1707 Siege of Port Royal
- 1709 Battle of St. John's
- 1709 Battle of Fort Albany
- 1710 Siege of Port Royal
- 1711 Battle of Bloody Creek

- 1722–1725 Father Rale's War

- 1722 Battle of Winnepang
- 1723 Raid on Canso
- 1724 Raid on Annapolis Royal
- 1725 Raid on Canso

- 1744–1748 King George's War

- 1744 Raid on Canso
- 1744 Siege of Fort Anne
- 1745 Siege of Port Toulouse
- 1745 Siege of Louisbourg
- 1746 Battle at Port-la-Joye
- 1747 Battle of Grand Pré

- 1749–1755 Father Le Loutre's War

- 1749 Raid on Dartmouth
- 1749 Siege of Grand Pre
- 1749–1750 Battles at Chignecto
- 1750 Battle at St. Croix
- 1751 Raid on Dartmouth
- 1751 Raid on Chignecto
- 1751 Raids on Halifax
- 1753 Attack at Country Harbour

- 1754–1763 Seven Years' War

- 1755 Naval Action off Newfoundland
- 1755 Battle of Fort Beauséjour
- 1755 Bay of Fundy Campaign
- 1755 Battle of Petitcodiac
- 1756 Raid on Lunenburg
- 1757 Battle on Snowshoes
- 1757 Battle of Bloody Creek
- 1758 Siege of Louisbourg
- 1758 Battle of Fort Frontenac
- 1758 Gulf of St. Lawrence Campaign
- 1758 Île Saint-Jean Campaign
- 1758 Petitcodiac River Campaign
- 1758 Battle on Snowshoes – occurred in the British Province of New York and New France.
- 1759 St. John River Campaign
- 1759 Battle of Beauport
- 1759 Battle of the Plains of Abraham
- 1759 St. Francis Raid
- 1760 Battle of Sainte-Foy
- 1760 Siege of Quebec
- 1760 Battle of Restigouche
- 1760 Montreal Campaign
- 1760 Battle of the Thousand Islands
- 1762 Battle of Signal Hill

- 1763–1766 Pontiac's War

- 1763 Battle of Point Pelee

- 1775–1776 American Revolutionary War
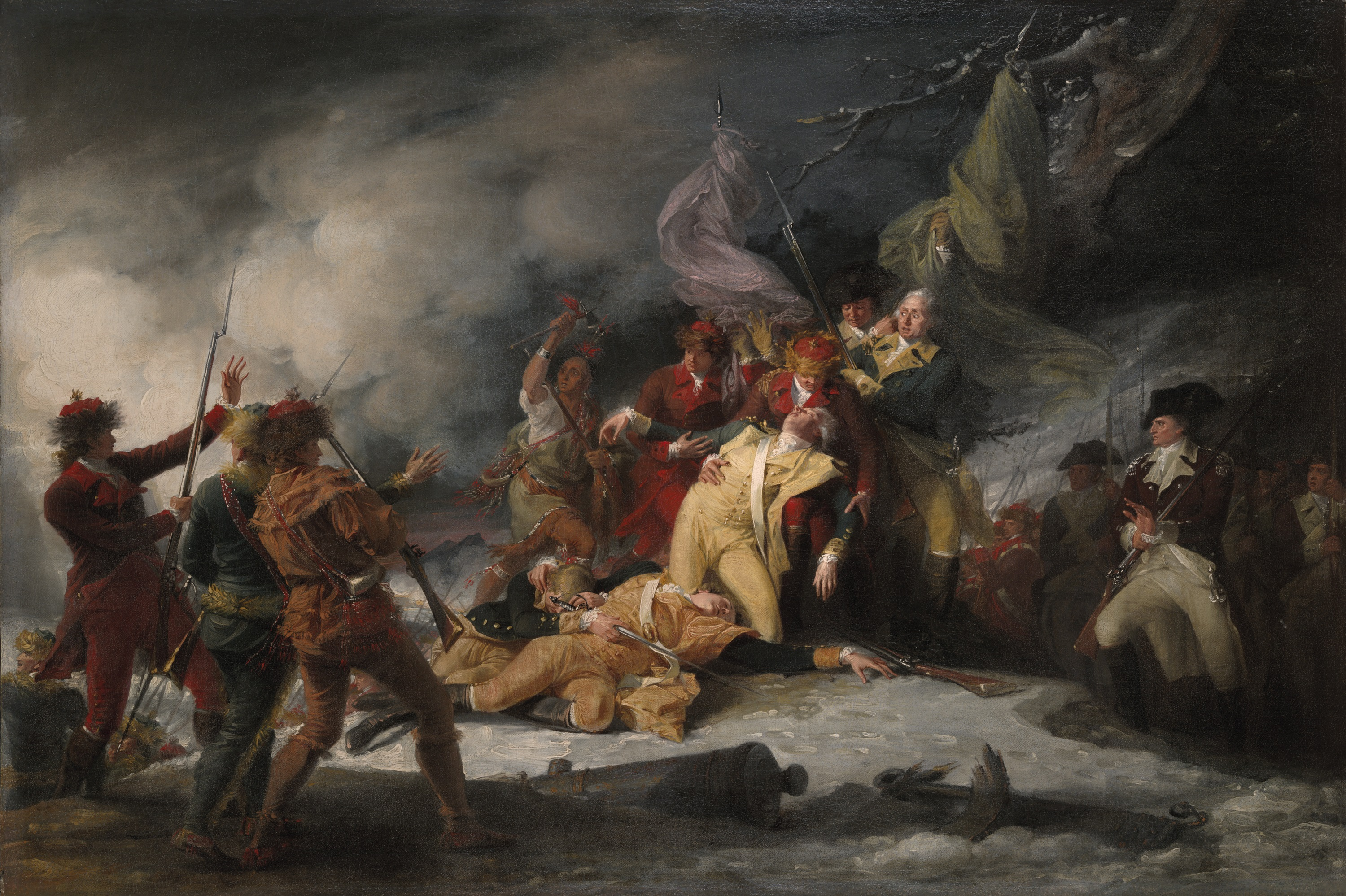
  The Battle of Quebec where the early United States attempted to convince Quebec to join the American Revolution for independence from the British. The British victory assured that British Canada would not join the United States. The Death of General Montgomery in the Attack on Quebec, December 31, 1775 by John Trumbull

- 1775 Invasion of Canada
- 1775 Arnold's expedition to Quebec
- 1775 Battle of Longue-Pointe
- 1775 Siege of Fort St. Jean
- 1775 Battle of Quebec
- 1776 Battle of the Cedars
- 1776 Battle of Saint-Pierre
- 1776 Battle of Trois-Rivières
- 1776 Battle of Fort Cumberland
- 1777 Siege of Saint John
- 1781 Naval battle off Cape Breton
- 1782 Naval battle off Halifax
- 1782 Raid on Lunenburg
- 1782 Hudson Bay Expedition

- 1789 Nootka Crisis
- 1792 Destruction of Opitsaht
- 1793 Raids on Pine Island Fort
- 1792–1797 War of the First Coalition

- 1796 Newfoundland expedition

==== 19th century ====
- 1800 United Irish Uprising
- 1811 Tonquin incident
- 1812 War of 1812

- 1812 Raid on Gananoque
- 1812 Battle of Queenston Heights
- 1812 Naval action off Kingston
- 1812 Battle of Lacolle Mills
- 1813 Raid on Elizabethtown
- 1813 Battle of York
- 1813 Battle of Fort George
- 1813 Battle of Stoney Creek
- 1813 Battle of Beaver Dams
- 1813 Capture of the Growler and the Julia
- 1813 Battle of Chateauguay
- 1813 The "Burlington Races"
- 1813 Battle of River Canard
- 1813 Battle of the Thames
- 1813 Massequoi Village
- 1813 Battle of Crysler's Farm
- 1814 Battle of Longwoods
- 1814 Battle of Lacolle Mills
- 1814 Battle of Odelltown
- 1814 Raid on Port Dover
- 1814 Capture of Fort Erie
- 1814 Battle of Chippawa
- 1814 Battle of Lundy's Lane
- 1814 Siege of Fort Erie
- 1814 Engagements on Lake Huron
  - 1814 Action at Nottawasaga
  - 1814 Capture of the Tigress and the Scorpion
- 1814 Capture of Fort Erie
- 1814 Siege of Fort Erie
- 1814 Battle of Cook's Mills
- 1814 Battle of Malcolm's Mills

- 1816 Pemmican War

- 1816 Capture of Fort Gibraltar
- 1816 Battle of Seven Oaks
- 1816 Capture of Fort Douglas
- 1816 Capture of Fort William

- 1835–1845 Shiners' War
- 1837–1838 Lower Canada Rebellion

- 1837 Battle of Saint-Denis
- 1837 Battle of Saint-Charles
- 1837 Battle of Saint-Eustache
- 1838 Battle of Lacolle
- 1838 Battle of Odelltown
- 1838 Battle of Beauharnois

- 1837–1838 Upper Canada Rebellion

- 1837 Battle of Montgomery's Tavern
- 1838 Battle of Pelee Island
- 1838 Short Hills Raid
- 1838 Battle of the Windmill
- 1838 Battle of Windsor

- 1838 Aroostook War
- 1838 Nicola's War
- 1849 Courthouse Rebellion
- 1849 Montreal Riots
- 1849 Stony Monday Riot
- 1858 Fraser Canyon Gold Rush skirmishes along the Okanagan Trail
- 1858 Fraser Canyon War
- 1859 McGowan's War
- 1859 Pig War
- 1863 Lamalcha War
- 1864 Chilcotin War
- 1864 Kingfisher Incident
- 1866–1871 Fenian Raids

- 1866 Battle of Ridgeway
- 1866 Battle of Fort Erie
- 1866 Battle of Pigeon Hill
- 1870 Battle of Eccles Hill
- 1870 Battle of Trout River

- 1867 Grouse Creek War
- 1869–1870 Red River Rebellion

- 1870 Wolseley Expedition

- 1870 Battle of the Belly River
- 1873 Cypress Hill smoke Massacre
- 1885 North-West Rebellion

- 1885 Battle of Duck Lake
- 1885 Frog Lake Massacre
- 1885 Battle of Fort Pitt
- 1885 Battle of Fish Creek
- 1885 Battle of Cut Knife
- 1885 Battle of Batoche
- 1885 Battle of Frenchman's Butte
- 1885 Battle of Loon Lake

- 1886 Anti-Chinese Riots
- 1887 Wild Horse Creek War

==== 20th century ====
- 1902 – June 22: Toronto Streetcar Strike riot
- 1907 – Anti-Oriental Riots (Vancouver)
- 1913 – Vancouver Island War
- 1918 – Conscription Crisis of 1917
- 1918 – Vancouver General Strike
- 1919 – Winnipeg General Strike
- 1925 – New Waterford Rebellion. See Davis Day.
- 1926 – Regina Riots
- 1933 – August 16: Christie Pits riot in Toronto.
- 1935 – The On-to-Ottawa Trek and Regina Riot.
- 1935 – The Battle of Ballantyne Pier
- 1938 – Bloody Sunday
- 1939–1945 – Second World War

- 1939–1945 – Battle of the Atlantic
- 1940 – Occupation of St. Pierre and Miquelon
- 1942–1944 – Battle of the St. Lawrence
- 1942 – Bombardment of Estevan Point lighthouse
- 1944 – Terrace Mutiny
- 1945 – Halifax Riot on Victory in Europe Day.

- 1955 – Richard Riot
- 1967 – Yorkville, Toronto summer street sit-ins and "riots".
- 1969 – Murray-Hill riot
- 1970 – FLQ – October Crisis
- 1971 – Gastown Riots
- 1982 – October 14: The Squamish Five, bombs a Litton Industries factory.
- 1983 – Solidarity Crisis
- 1990 – July 11 to September 26: Oka Crisis
- 1990–1992 – Strike, strike-breaking, and bombing at Royal Oak Mines in Yellowknife, NWT
- 1993 – June 9: Montreal Stanley Cup Riot
- 1994 – June 14: Vancouver Stanley Cup Riot
- 1995 – Gustafsen Lake Standoff
- 1995 – Ipperwash Crisis
- 1997–2000 – Wiebo Ludwig and his followers bomb wellheads in Alberta's oil country

==== 21st century ====
- February 28, 2006 – July 2011 Caledonia land dispute
- 2009 Vancouver gang war
- January 22 — February 23, 2022 Canada convoy protest

=== Greenland ===
- Early 1400s Possible Thule-Norse Greenlander Conflict
- 1939-1945 Greenland in World War II

=== United States ===
This includes all conflicts that have taken place within the modern territory of the United States. See also

- List of conflicts in the United States
- List of incidents of civil unrest in the United States
- List of rampage killers in the Americas
- List of wars involving the United States
- United States military casualties of war

==== Puerto Rico ====
Puerto Rico is geographically located within the Caribbean; however, because Puerto Rico territory of the United States the island's conflicts are listed here.

- 1511 Taino rebellion
- 1568–1648 Eighty Years' War
  - September 24, 1625 Battle of San Juan
- 1868 Grito de Lares
- April 25 – August 12, 1898 Spanish–American War
  - May 12, 1898 Bombardment of San Juan
  - June 22, 1898 Second Battle of San Juan
  - June 28, 1898 Third Battle of San Juan
  - 1898 U.S. invasion of Puerto Rico through Guanica in the south of the island

==== Precolonial ====
This includes all known conflicts that occurred within the territory of the United States of America prior to European exploration.

- 1140-1150 Collapse of Early Pueblo culture in Chaco Canyon
- 1300 Fall of Cahokia
- 1325 Crow Creek massacre

==== American Indian Wars ====
This list covers all wars regarding Native Americans and First Nations within the 49 continental states of the United States (does not include territories) and the 10 provinces and 3 territories of Canada. This includes conflicts fought between American Indian and First Nation tribes and wars against encroachment from European Colonial Powers or the United States and Canada. Generally American Indian Wars classifies all conflicts for Native Americans and First Nations between 1540 and 1924 however this list also includes 20th century incidents on Indian Reservations.

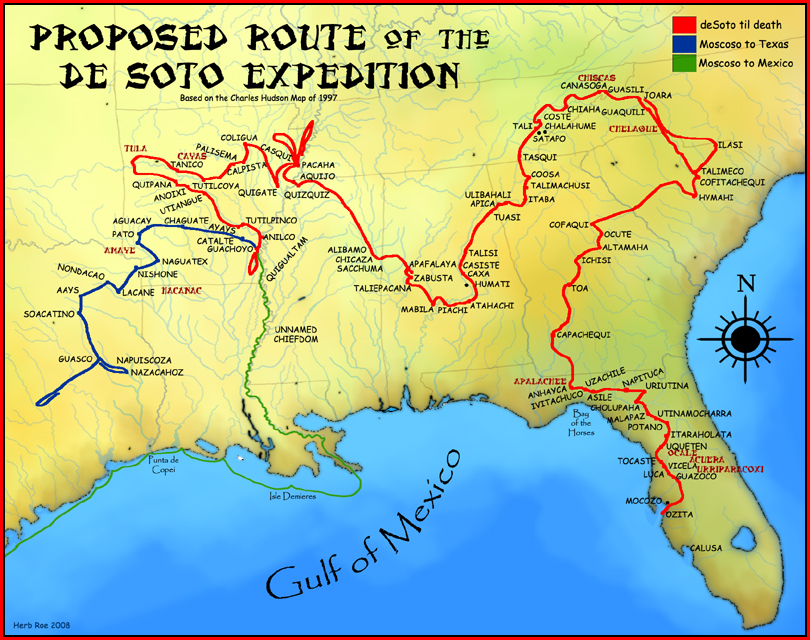
Hernando De Soto's expedition through the Southeast United States was the first major conflict between Europeans and Native Americans in the U.S. Thousands of natives were killed by the expedition, and the majority of the expedition including De Soto did not survive the journey.

- 1540-1542 Herando de Soto's Expedition
- 1609–1701 Beaver Wars

- February 1692 Mohawk Valley raid

- 1610–1646 Anglo-Powhatan Wars

- 1610–1614 First Anglo-Powhatan War
- 1622–1632 Second Anglo-Powhatan War
- 1644–1646 Third Anglo-Powhatan War

- 1634–1638 Pequot War
- 1640 French and Iroquois Wars
- 1643 Kieft's War
- 1659 First Esopus War
- 1663 Second Esopus War
- 1675–1678 King Philip's War
- 1680 Pueblo Revolt
- 1689–1697 King William's War
- 1702–1713 Queen Anne's War
- 1706–1877 Comanche Wars
- 1711-1715 Tuscarora War
- 1715–1717 Yamasee War
- 1744–1748 King George's War
- 1760-1850 Russian Colonization of the Americas

- 1784 Awa'uq Massacre
- 1804 Battle of Sitka

- 1763 Pontiac's Rebellion
- 1774 Dunmore's War
- 1776-1795 Cherokee-American wars
- 1785–1795 Northwest Indian War
- Tecumseh's War 1811-1813
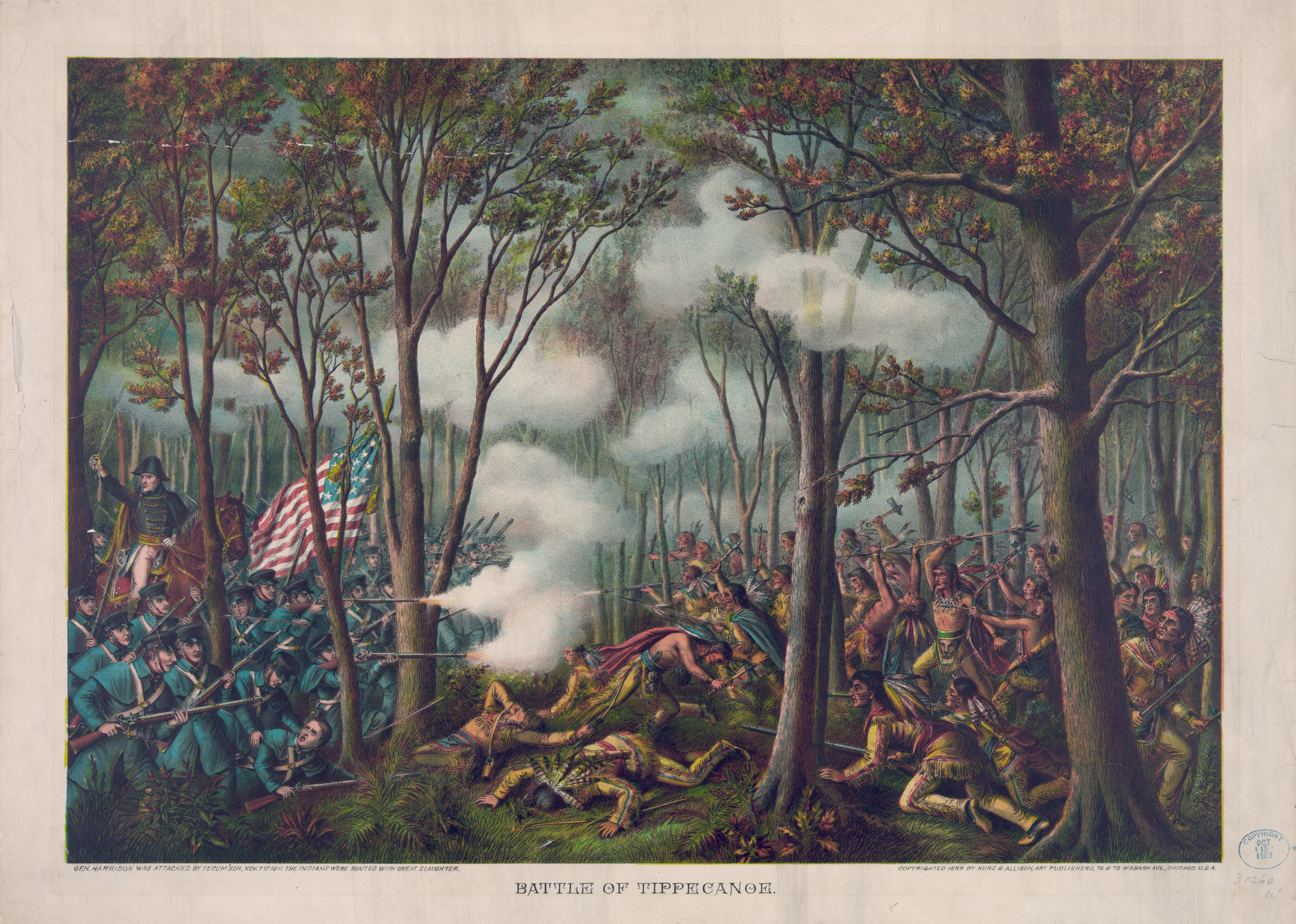
  Print shows Battle of Tippecanoe in Battle Ground Indiana where the U.S Army defeated warriors of Tecumseh's Confederacy. Part of Tecumseh's War against the United States.

- 1811 Battle of Tippecanoe

- 1813–1814 Creek War
- 1816–1858 Seminole Wars
- 1820–1875 Texas–Indian wars
- August 1823 Arikara War
- 1832 Black Hawk War
- 1835–1842 Second Seminole War
- 1842 1842 Slave Revolt in the Cherokee Nation
- 1846–1866 Navajo Wars
- 1849–1924 Apache Wars

- Victorio's War
- Renegade period of the Apache Wars 1881-1924

- Geronimo's War 1881-1886

- 1849–1923 Ute Wars
- 1849–1855 Jicarilla War
- 1850-1880 California Indian Wars
- 1850–1851 Mariposa War

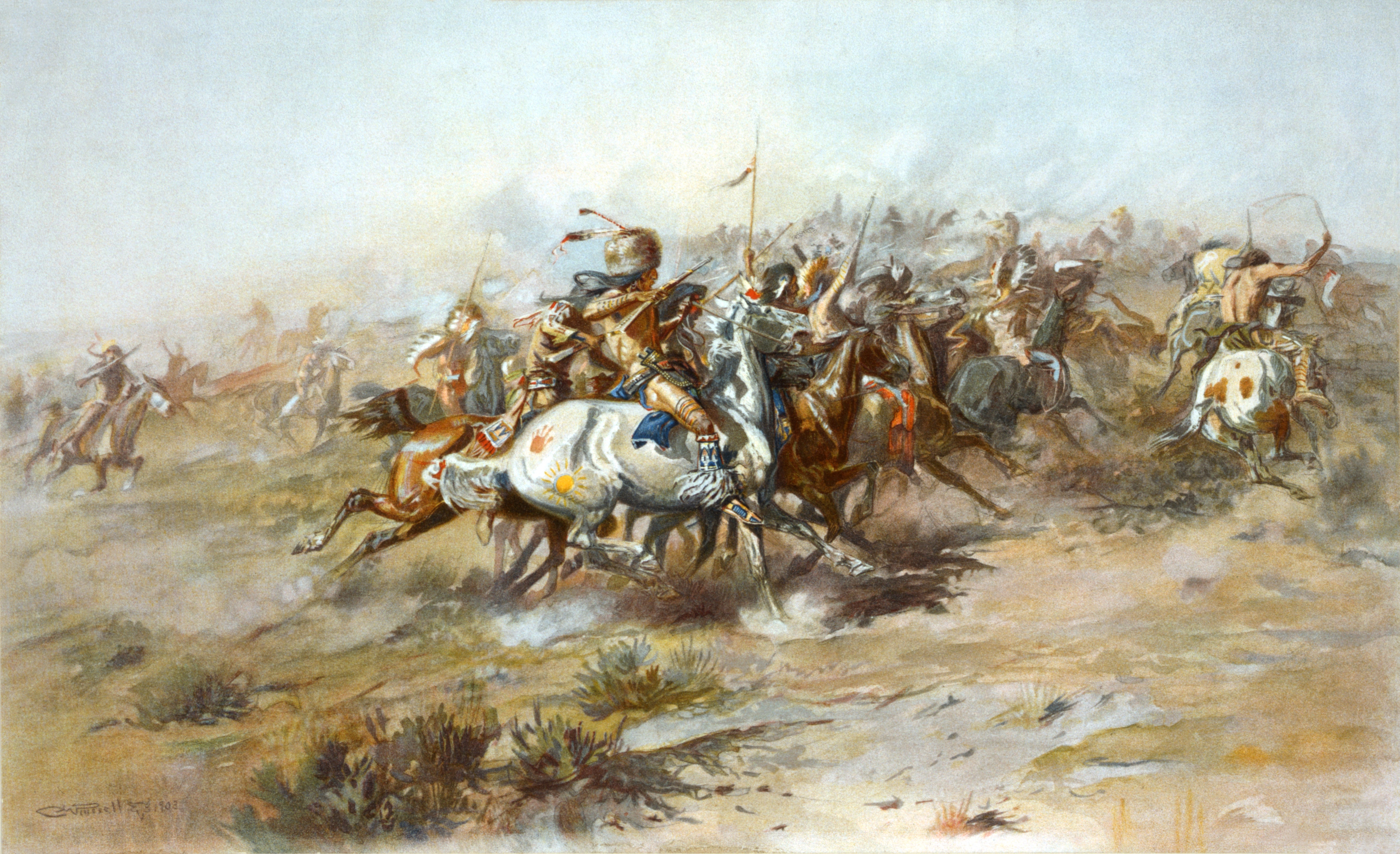
The Battle of Little Bighorn near the Little Bighorn river in the state a Montana. A confederation of Lakatoa and allied tribes defeated the U.S. 7th Cavalry Regiment. Part of the Great Sioux War which was an ultimately a victory of the U.S. Government. Painting is The Custer Fight by Charles Marion Russell.

- Sioux Wars 1854–1891

- August 19, 1854 Grattan massacre
- 1862 Dakota War
- 1863–1865 Colorado War::*August 1 – September 24, 1865
- Powder River Expedition
- 1866–1868 Red Cloud's War
- 1876-1877 Great Sioux War
- December 29, 1890 – January 15, 1891 Ghost Dance War

- December 29, 1890 Wounded Knee Massacre

- 1855–1856 Yakima War
- February 1856 Tintic War
- 1857–1858 Utah War
- 1859–1860 Mendocino War
- 1860 Paiute War
- 1862 Dakota War
- 1865–1872 Black Hawk War
- 1872–1873 Modoc War
- 1879 White River War
- 1898 Battle of Sugar Point
- March 1914 – March 11, 1915 Bluff War
- March 20–23, 1923 Posey War
- February 27 – May 8, 1973 Wounded Knee incident
- June 26, 1975 Pine Ridge Shootout

==== 17th century ====
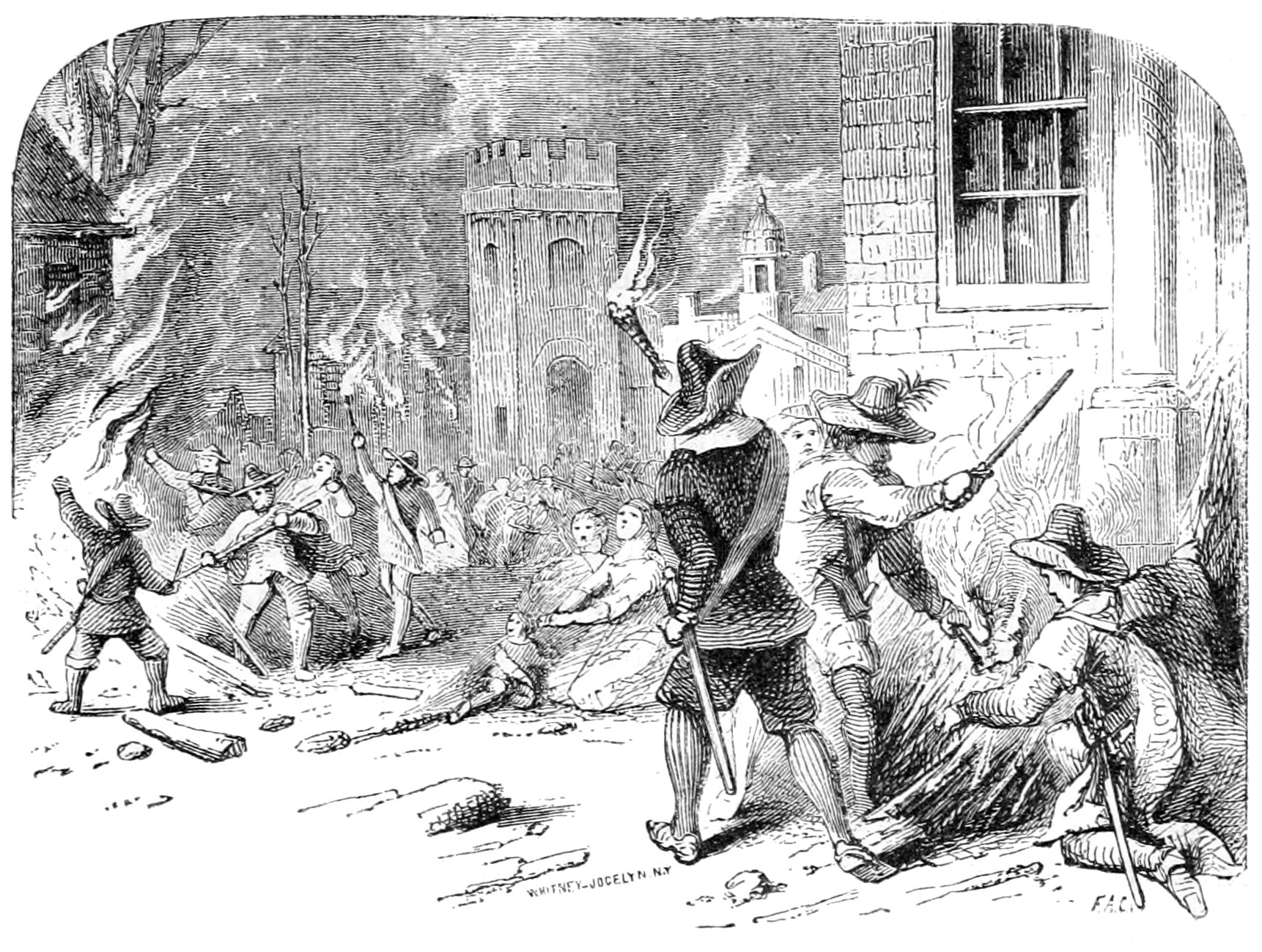
The Burning of Jamestown, Virginia by Bacon's Rebellion. Common Indentured Servants and African Slaves fought together against the government of Colonial Virginia. The Rebellion's failure caused a hardening of racial lines in Colonial English America.

This covers all conflicts in the 1600s that occurred between rival European Colonial Powers, or between Colonists and their Colonial Administration. This section does not include conflicts regarding Native Americans.

- August 27, 1664 The annexation of New Netherland by the English
  - English conquest of New Amsterdam (New York City)
- 1665–1667 Second Anglo-Dutch War
  - June 1667, a Dutch warship attacked Old Point Comfort
- 1672–1674 Third Anglo-Dutch War
  - August 1673 The Dutch recaptured New Netherland
  - November 1674 The Treaty of Westminster concluded the war and ceded New Netherland to the English
- 1676 Bacon's Rebellion
- September 1688 – September 1697 King William's War
  - June 27, 1689 Raid on Dover
  - August 2–3, 1689 Siege of Pemaquid
  - March 27, 1690 Raid on Salmon Falls
  - May 20–21, 1690 Battle of Fort Loyal
  - January 24, 1692 Raid on York
  - June 10–13, 1692 Raid on Wells
  - July 18, 1694 Raid on Oyster River
  - August 14–15, 1696 Siege of Pemaquid
  - March 15, 1697 Raid on Haverhill

==== 18th century ====
This covers all conflicts in the 1700s that occurred between rival European Colonial Powers, or between the early United States against European Colonial Powers. Many of the wars in this period were extensions of wars from continental Europe. This section does not include conflicts regarding Native Americans.

- 1701–1714 Queen Anne's War

- October 7–18, 1702 Battle of Flint River
- November 10 – December 30, 1702 Siege of St. Augustine
- August 10 – October 6, 1703 Northeast Coast Campaign
- February 29, 1704 Raid on Deerfield
- January 25–26, 1704 Apalachee massacre
- September 1706 Charles Town expedition
- August 12 – November 30, 1707 Siege of Pensacola
- August 29, 1708 Raid on Haverhill

- Slave Revolts in Colonial English America

- 1712 New York Slave Revolt of 1712
- 1739 Stono Rebellion

- December 16, 1740 – October 18, 1748 King George's War
  - July 19 – September 5, 1745 Northeast Coast Campaign
  - November 28, 1745 Raid on Saratoga
  - August 19–20, 1746 Siege of Fort Massachusetts
  - April 7–9, 1747 Siege of Fort at Number 4

*1754–1763 The French and Indian War

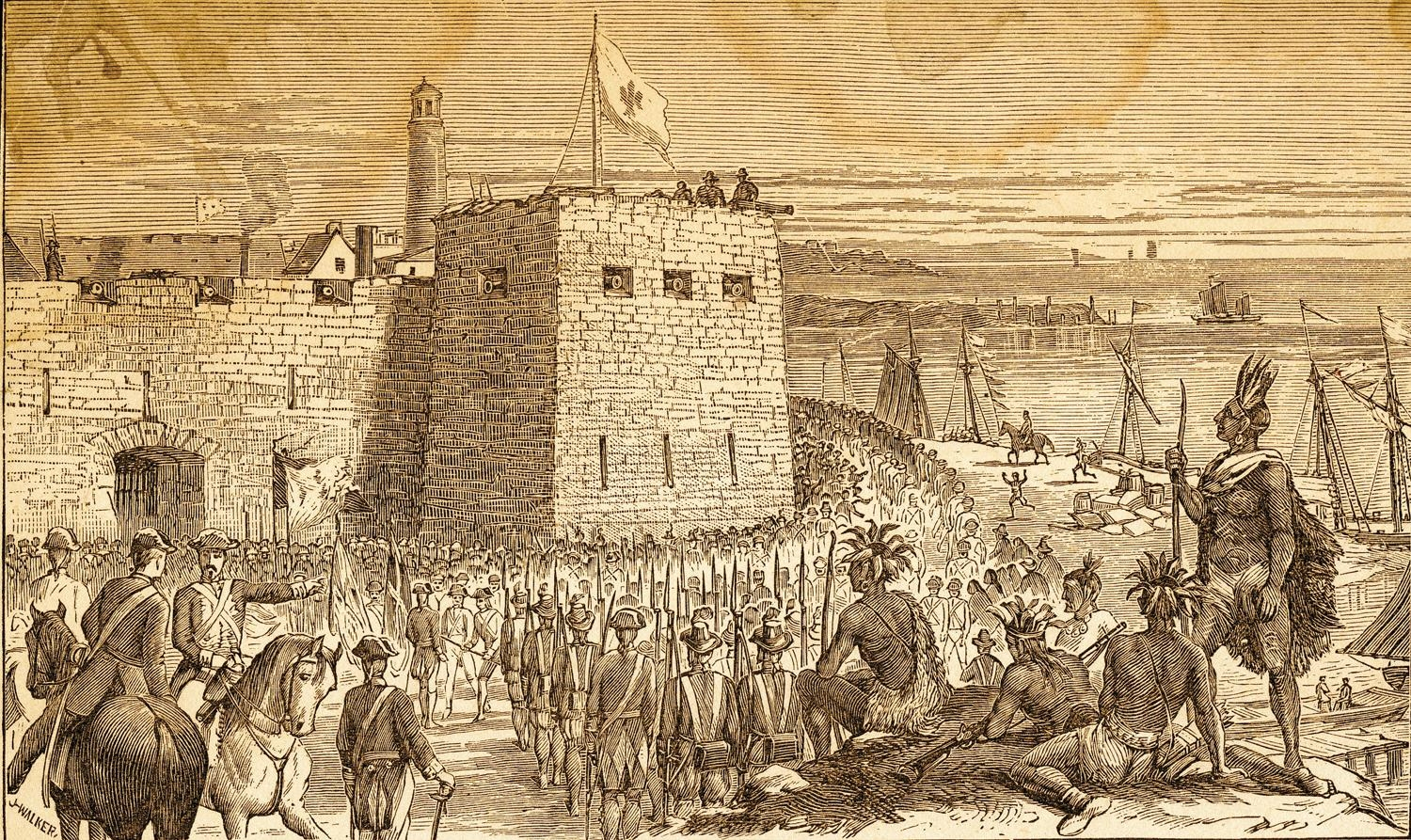
Battle of Fort Oswego fought in Oswego, New York part of the French an Indian War. An alliance of French and Native American tribes defeated a British assault. New France enjoyed strong relations with Natives in the Great Lakes Region. Despite early French victories British supremacy on the sea assured victory in the overall war. Drawing by J.Walker

Was fought within both Canada and the United States

- May 28, 1754 Battle of Jumonville Glen
- July 3, 1754 Battle of Fort Necessity
- June 16, 1755 Battle of Fort Beauséjour
- July 9, 1755 Braddock Expedition
- 1755 Battle of Lake George
- April 18, 1756 Battle of Great Cacapon
- August, 1756 Battle of Fort Oswego
- September 8, 1756 Kittanning Expedition
- January 21, 1757 Battle on Snowshoes
- July 26, 1757 Battle of Sabbath Day Point
- August 9, 1757 Battle of Fort William Henry
- March 23, 1758 Battle on Snowshoes
- July 27, 1758 Battle of Louisburg
- August, 1758 Battle of Fort Frontenac
- July 8, 1758 Battle of Carillon
- September 14, 1758 Battle of Fort Duquesne
- October 12, 1758 Battle of Fort Ligonier
- November 25, 1758 Forbes Expedition
- 1759 Battle of Ticonderoga
- 1759 Battle of Fort Niagara
- July 31, 1759 Battle of Beauport
- 1762 Battle of Signal Hill

- 1764–1771 War of the Regulation

- 1774–1776 Boston campaign
- 1775–1776 Invasion of Canada
- 1776 New York Campaign
- 1777 Saratoga Campaign
- 1779 Sullivan Expedition

1775–1783 American Revolutionary War

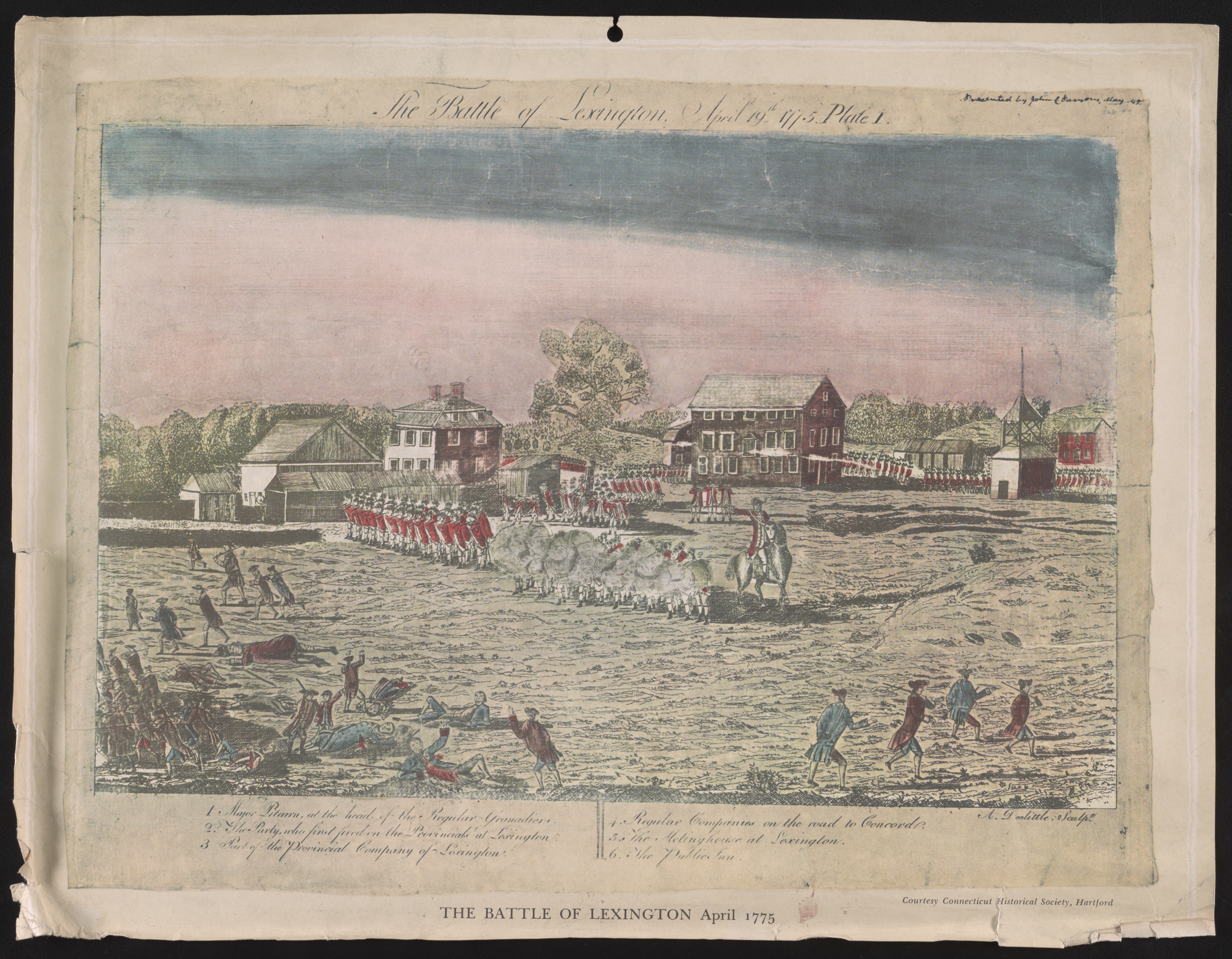
The first of four engravings of the Battle of Lexington and Concord by Amos Doolittle from 1775. Doolittle visited the battle sites and interviewed soldiers and witnesses. Contains controversial elements, possibly inaccuracies. Fire from the militia may have occurred but is not depicted.

- April 19, 1775 Battle of Lexington and Concord
- April 20, 1775 – March 17, 1776 Siege of Boston
- May 10, 1775 Capture of Fort Ticonderoga
- June 11–12, 1775 Battle of Machias
- June 17, 1775 Battle of Bunker Hill
- August 8, 1775 Battle of Gloucester
- August 23 – November 3, 1775 Siege of Fort St. Jean
- September 24, 1775 Battle of Longue-Pointe
- November 14, 1775 Battle of Kemp's Landing
- November 28 – December 9, 1775 Battle of Great Bridge
- February 27, 1776 Battle of Moore's Creek Bridge
- March 2–4, 1776 Fortification of Dorchester Heights
- March 2–3, 1776 Battle of the Rice Boats
- May 15–26, 1776 Battle of the Cedars
- June 8, 1776 Battle of Trois-Rivières
- August 27, 1776 Battle of Long Island
- September 15, 1776 Landing at Kip's Bay
- September 16, 1776 Battle of Harlem Heights
- October 11, 1776 Battle of Valcour Bay
- October 28, 1776 Battle of White Plains
- December 26, 1776 Battle of Trenton
- January 3, 1777 Battle of Princeton
- July 5–6, 1777 Siege of Fort Ticonderoga
- August 6, 1777 Battle of Oriskany
- August 16, 1777 Battle of Bennington
- September 11, 1777 Battle of Brandywine
- September 19, 1777 Battle of Freeman's Farm
- October 2, 1777 Battle of Germantown
- October 7, 1777 Battle of Bemis Heights
- October 17, 1777 Battle of Saratoga
- May 25, 1778 Battle of Freetown
- June 28, 1778 Battle of Monmouth
- June 30, 1778 Battle of Alligator Bridge
- July 27, 1778 First Battle of Ushant
- August 29, 1778 Battle of Rhode Island
- February 23–25, 1779 Battle of Vincennes
- July 16, 1779 Battle of Stony Point
- July 24 – August 12, 1779 Penobscot Expedition
- August 29, 1779 Battle of Newtown
- October 9, 1779 Siege of Savannah
- January 16, 1780 Battle of Cape St. Vincent
- March 29, 1780 Siege of Charleston
- August 8, 1780 Battle of Piqua
- August 16, 1780 Battle of Camden
- October 7, 1780 Battle of King's Mountain
- January 17, 1781 Battle of Cowpens
- March 15, 1781 Battle of Guilford Court House

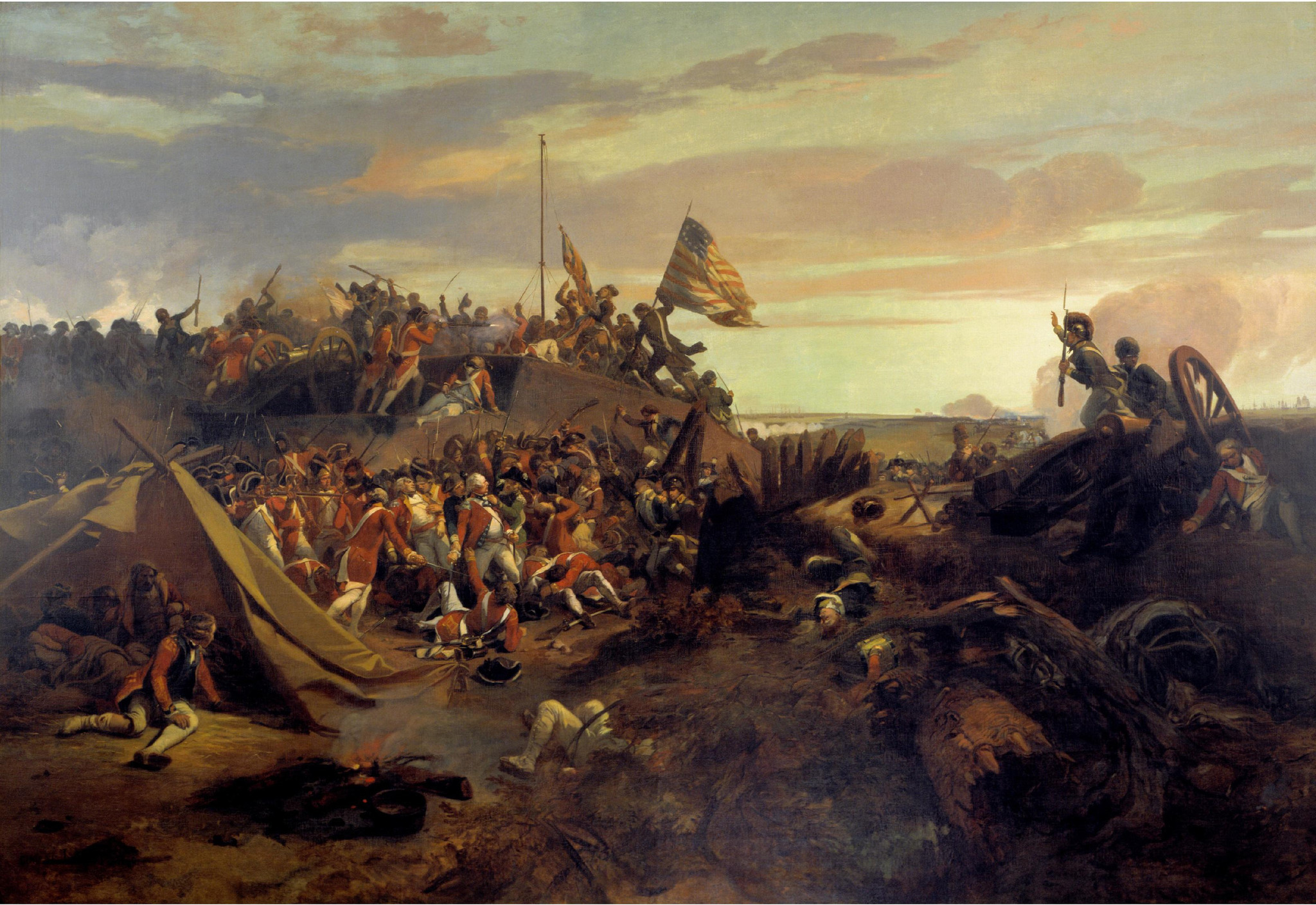
Siege of Yorktown in Yorktown, Virginia was the deciding battle of the American Revolutionary War and among the largest North American Battles of the 18th century. America's independence was recognized in 1783. Painting by Eugene Lami

- September 6, 1781 Battle of Groton Heights
- September 8, 1781 Battle of Eutaw Springs
- September 28 – October 19, 1781 Siege of Yorktown*
- December 12, 1781 Second Battle of Ushant
- February 17, 1782 Battle of Sadras
- April 9–12, 1782 Battle of the Saintes
- August 19, 1782 Battle of Blue Licks

- 1794 Whiskey Rebellion
- Slave Revolts in Spanish Louisiana

- 1791 Mina's Conspiracy
- 1795 Pointe Coupee Conspiracy

==== 19th century ====
This covers all conflicts in the 1800s that occurred between the governments of North America that took place within the modern territory of the United States of America and conflicts between North American and European states. This does not include conflicts regarding Native Americans. *1812–1814 War of 1812

- December 1812,Siege of Detroit
- 1813 Battle of Lake Erie
- 1813 – August 1814 Creek War
- August 24, 1814 Battle of Bladensburg
  - August 24, 1814 Burning of Washington
- November 7–9, 1814 Battle of Pensacola
- December 13, 1814 Action of 13 December 1814 (Louisiana Campaign)
- December 14, 1814 Battle of Lake Borgne
- January 9–18, 1815 Bombardment of Fort St. Philip
- January 13–14, 1815 Battle of Fort Peter
- Battle of New Orleans - August, 1815
- August 21–23, 1831 Nat Turner's Slave Rebellion

*1835–1836 Texas Revolution

- October 2, 1835 Battle of Gonzales
- October 10, 1835 Battle of Goliad
- November 4, 1835 Battle of Lipantitlán
- October 28, 1835 Battle of Concepción
- November 26, 1835 Grass Fight
- October 12 – December 11, 1835 Siege of Béxar
- February 27, 1836 Battle of San Patricio
- March 2, 1836 Battle of Agua Dulce
- February 23 – March 6, 1836 Battle of the Alamo
- March 12–15, 1836 Battle of Refugio
- March 19–20, 1836 Battle of Coleto
- April 21, 1836 Battle of San Jacinto

- 1838 Missouri Mormon War
- 1844–1846 Illinois Mormon War

*1846–1848 Mexican–American War

- August 13 – September 30, 1846 Siege of Los Angeles

- 1854–1858 Bleeding Kansas
  - 1856 Sacking of Lawrence
  - 1856 Pottawatomie Massacre
- October 29, 1859 John Brown's Raid on Harper's Ferry

*1861–1865 American Civil War

  - February 11–16, 1862 Battle of Fort Donelson
  - April 6–7, 1862 Battle of Shiloh
  - August 28–30, 1862 Second Battle of Bull Run
  - September 17, 1862 Battle of Antietam
  - December 31, 1862 – January 2, 1863 Battle of Stones River
  - April 30 – May 6, 1863 Battle of Chancellorsville
  - July 1–3, 1863 Battle of Gettysburg
  - July 13–16, 1863 New York City draft riots
  - September 19–20, 1863 Battle of Chickamauga
  - May 5–7, 1864 Battle of the Wilderness
  - May 8–21, 1864 Battle of Spotsylvania Court House
  - April 7, 1864 Battle of Appomattox Court House
  - November 15, 1864 - December 21, 1865 Sherman's March to the Sea
  - June 9, 1864 - March 25, 1865 Siege of Petersburg
- 1865–1866 Fenian Raids
- 1878 Lincoln County War
- 1881 Gunfight at the O.K. Corral
- 1887-1894 Hatfield-McCoy Feud
- 1892 Homestead Strike

==== 20th Century ====
This covers all conflicts and terrorist attacks in the 1900s that occurred within the modern territory of the United States of America. This also includes attacks upon the United States from Eurasian powers.

- 1910–1919 Border War
- April 20, 1914 Ludlow Massacre
- 1914–1918 World War I
  - April 21, 1914 Ypiranga incident
  - July 30, 1916 2:08:00 AM (AST; GMT−4) Black Tom explosion
  - January 11, 1917 Kingsland explosion
  - August 2–3, 1917 Green Corn Rebellion
  - July 21, 1918 Attack on Orleans
  - August 7, 1918 Battle of Ambos Nogales
- May 31 – June 1, 1921 Tulsa race massacre
- 1912–1921 West Virginia coal wars
  - September 10–21, 1921 Battle of Blair Mountain
- 1939–1945 World War II

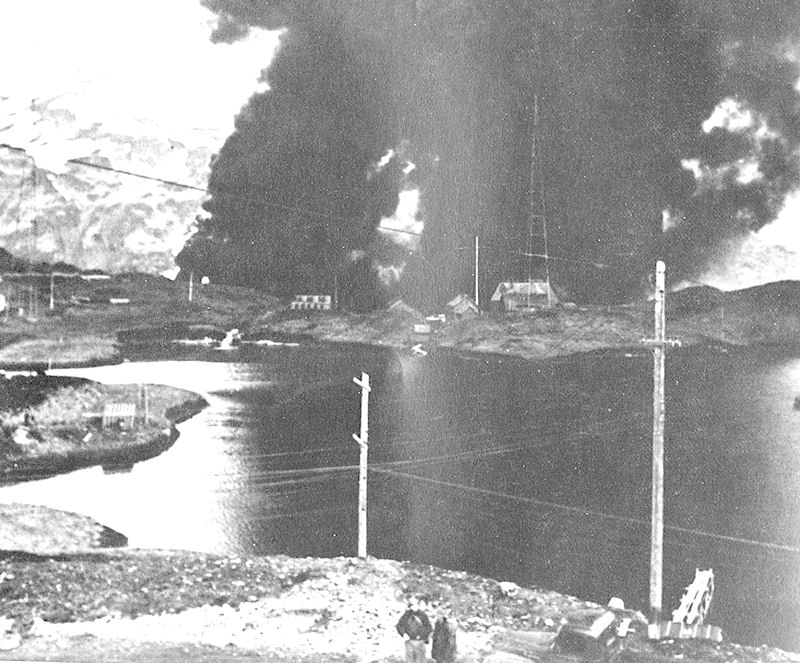
The Navy radio station at Dutch Harbor burning after the Japanese Attack, 4 June 1942 According to Japanese intelligence, the nearest field for land-based American aircraft was at Fort Morrow AAF on Kodiak, more than 600 miles (970 km) away, and Dutch Harbor was a sitting duck for the strong Japanese fleet, carrying out a coordinated operation with a fleet that was to capture Midway Island. The Dutch Harbor attack was part of the Aleutian Islands Campaign.

  - October 16, 1940 – May 21, 1941 Machita Incident
  - December 7, 1941 Attack on Pearl Harbor (Not in North America)
  - February 23, 1942 Bombardment of Ellwood
  - February 24–25, 1942 Battle of Los Angeles
  - June 3, 1942 – August 15, 1943 Battle of the Aleutian Islands
  - June 21, 1942 Bombardment of Fort Stevens
  - July 27, 1942 Lordsburg Killings
  - September 9–29, 1942 Lookout Air Raids
  - May 30, 1943 Zoot Suit Riots
  - August 14, 1944 Fort Lawton Riot
  - March 12, 1945 Santa Fe Riot
  - April 16, – September 17, 1945 Project Hula
  - July 8, 1945 Midnight Massacre
- May 2–4, 1946 Battle of Alcatraz
- August 1–3 Battle of Athens (1946)
- August 11–17, 1965 Watts Rebellion
- July 23–27, 1967 1967 Detroit riot
- May 4, 1970 Kent State shootings
- September 9, 1971 Attica Prison riot
- May 13, 1985 MOVE bombing in Philadelphia
- April 29, 1992 Los Angeles riots
- August 21–31, 1992 Ruby Ridge standoff
- February 28 – April 19, 1993 Waco siege
- April 11–21, 1993 Lucasville Prison Riot
- April 19, 1995 Oklahoma City bombing
- February 28, 1997 North Hollywood shootout
- March 19 – 20, 1997 Heaven's Gate mass suicide

==== 21st century ====
This includes domestic conflicts and terrorist attacks that took place within the United States. Note that actions of terrorism and domestic conflict are distinguished from one another.

- 2001–2021 war on terrorism

- September 11, 2001 September 11 attacks
- May 8, 2007 Fort Dix attack plot
- November 5, 2009 Fort Hood shooting
- April 15, 2013 Boston Marathon bombing
- April 2, 2014 2014 Fort Hood shootings

- April 5, 2014 – May 2014 Bundy standoff
- August 10, 2014 – August 11, 2015
- January, 1 – February 16, 2016 Occupation of the Malheur National Wildlife Refuge
- May 25, 2020 – September 26, 2023 United States racial unrest (2020–2023)
- January 6, 2021 January 6 United States Capitol attack
- July 3, 2021 Wakefield standoff

== Middle America ==
=== Mexico ===
==== Pre-Columbian ====
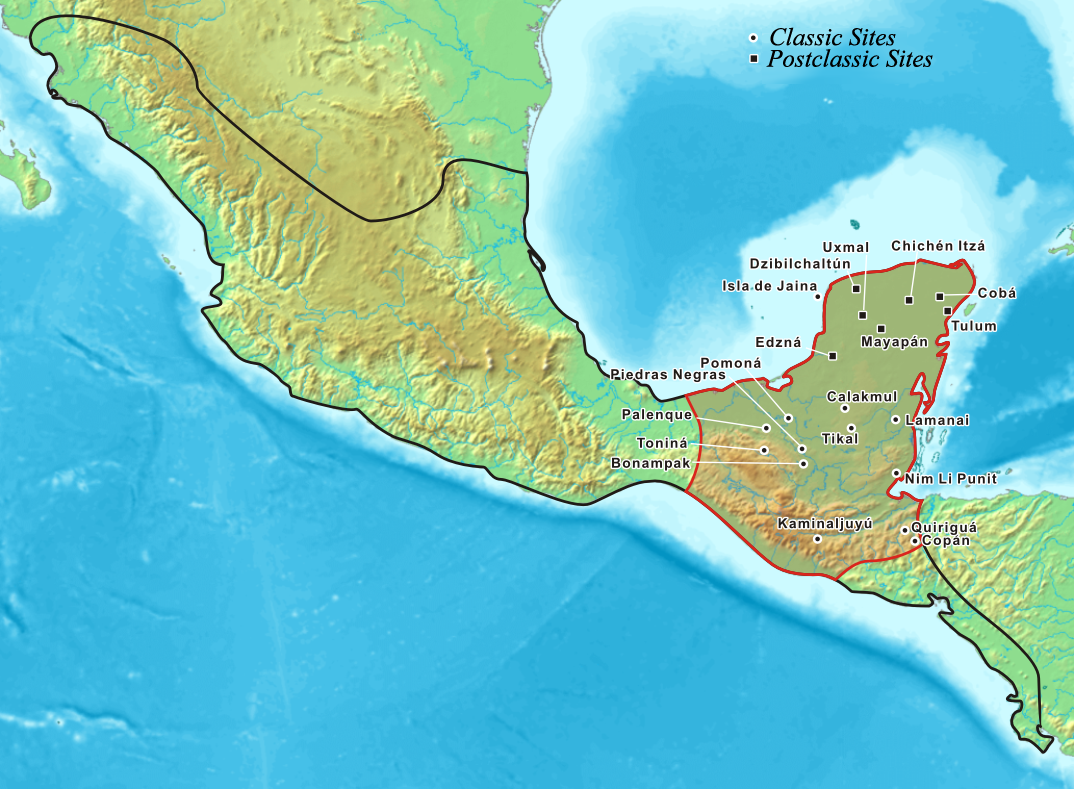
Map depicting the Maya area within the larger Mesoamerican region. View full size for details.

- 537 – 838 Tikal–Calakmul wars
  - 537 – 572 First Tikal–Calakmul War
  - 650 – 695 Second Tikal–Calakmul War
  - 720 – 744 Third Tikal–Calakmul War
- circa 1250–1325 Conflict between the city-states of Tizaapan and Culhuacán ending with the Mexica driven away from Tizaapan to form Tenochtitlan in Lake Texcoco in 1325
- circa 1325–1426 Conflict between the alliance of Tenochtitlan and Azcapotzalco against the city-state of Texcoco, ending in victory for the Tepanec empire
  - 1376–1395 Acamapichtli, the first tlatoani of Tenochtitlan, sent expeditions to fight for Azcapotzalco against various city states, notably Chalco, Cuahnahuac, Xochimilco
  - 1396–1417 Huitzilihuitl, the second tlatoani of Tenochtitlan, assisted in the conquest and sacking of the cities of Tultitlan, Cuauhtitlan, Chalco, Tollantzingo, Xaltocan, Otompa and Acolman
  - 1418 Tezozomoc's war with Ixtlilxochitl I of Texcoco
- 1426 Tepanec Civil War
  - 1427 Maxtla, ruler of Coyoacán incited a rebellion among the nobles of Azcapotzalco and usurped the throne
  - 1427–1440 Allying with Nezahualcoyotl of Texcoco, Itzcoatl went on to defeat Maxtla and end the Tepanec domination of central Mexico
- 1480 – 1510 Saltpeter War
- 1428–1521 Formation and expansion of the Aztec Triple Alliance.
  - 1430–1440 Successful campaigns against Xochimilco, Mixquic, Cuitlahuac, and Tezompa would secure agricultural resources for Tenochtitlan and, along with the conquest of Culhuacan and Coyoacán, would cement the Triple Alliance's control over the southern half of the Valley of Mexico.
  - 1454-1519 Flower war
  - 1440–1458 Reign of Moctezuma I
    - Subjugated the Huastec people and Totonac peoples
    - 1458 Moctezuma I led an expedition into Mixtec territory against the city-state of Coixtlahuaca
    - Campaigns conducted against Cosamaloapan, Ahuilizapan, and Cuetlachtlan
  - 1455 - 1516 Aztec-Tarascan Border Conflict
  - 1473 Axayacatl subjugated Tlatelolco
  - 1481–1486 Tizoc, the seventh tlatoani of Tenochtitlan, put down a rebellion of the Matlatzincan peoples of the Toluca Valley
  - 1486–1502 Ahuizotl began his reign by suppressing a Huastec rebellion, and then conquered the Mixtec and the Zapotec

==== 16th century ====
  - 1502–1520 Through warfare Moctezuma II expanded the territory of the Aztec Empire as far south as Xoconosco in Chiapas and the Isthmus of Tehuantepec, and incorporated the Zapotec and Yopi people into the empire

The maximal extent of the Aztec Empire, according to María del Carmen Solanes Carraro and Enrique Vela Ramírez.

- 1516 Texcoco Civil War
- 1519–1521 Spanish conquest of the Aztec Empire

- The Cholula Massacre of 1519
- Siege of Tenochtitlan (May 26 – August 13, 1521)

- 1527–1546 Spanish conquest of Yucatán
- 1533–1933 Mexican Indian Wars

- 1533 Yaqui Wars
- 1540 Conquest of Cíbola
- 1540 Tiguex War
- 1540–1542 Mixtón War
- 1550–1590 Chichimeca War
- 1599 Acoma Massacre

==== 17th century ====
- 1601 Acaxee Rebellion
- 1616 Tepehuán Revolt
- 1641–1924 Apache–Mexico Wars
- 1641–1864 Navajo Wars
- 1680 Pueblo Revolt

==== 18th century ====
- 1751 Pima Revolt
- 1757 First Magdalena Massacre

==== 19th century ====
- 1821–1870 Comanche–Mexico Wars
- 1847–1901 Caste War of Yucatán

- 1810–1821 Mexican War of Independence
- 1835–1836 Texas Revolution

Development of Spanish American Independence Government under traditional Spanish law Loyal to Supreme Central Junta or Cortes American junta or insurrection movement Independent state declared or established Height of French control of the Peninsula

- 1861–1867 French intervention in Mexico

==== 20th century ====
- 1910–1921 Mexican Revolution
- 1926–1929 Cristero War
- 1958 – 1959 Mexico–Guatemala conflict
- 1964 – 1982 Mexican Dirty War
- 1994 – 2020 Chiapas conflict
  - 1994 Zapatista uprising
- 1996 – present EPR insurgency
- 1999 1999 Matamoros standoff

==== 21st century ====
- 2004 – 2010 Sinaloa Cartel–Gulf Cartel conflict
- December 11, 2006 – present Mexican drug war
  - December 11, 2006 – present Operation Michoacán
  - January 2, 2007 – present Operation Baja California
  - 2008 – present Operation Sinaloa
  - 2007 – December 2013 Joint Operation Nuevo León-Tamaulipas
  - March 27, 2008 – present Operation Chihuahua
  - February 2009 – present Operation Quintana Roo
  - 2010 – 2011 Piracy on Falcon Lake
  - July 1, 2010 2010 Saric shootout
  - July 16 – August 4, 2011 Operación Lince Norte
  - August 28 – October 31, 2011 Operación Escorpión
  - September 2, 2011 – present Infighting in the Gulf Cartel
  - June 1, 2012 Infighting in Los Zetas
  - March 19, 2015 2015 Ocotlán ambush
  - April 6, 2015 2015 San Sebastián del Oeste ambush
  - May 1, 2015 1 May 2015 Jalisco attacks
  - May 22, 2015 2015 Tanhuato–Ecuandureo shootout
  - January 8, 2016 Operation Black Swan
  - January 29, 2016 Operation Diablo Express
  - February 10 – 11, 2016 Topo Chico prison riot
  - August 30, 2019 2019 Western Michoacán clashes
  - October 17, 2019 Battle of Culiacán
  - November 30, 2019 2019 Villa Unión shootout
  - April 3, 2020 Madera ambush
  - April 6 – 28, 2021 Capture of Aguililla
  - October 14 – 15, 2021 Battle of Doctor Coss
  - December 1, 2021 Tula prison break
  - August 24, 2022 Tuzantla shootout
  - January 5 – 13, 2023 2023 Sinaloa unrest
  - September 9, 2024 – present Infighting in the Sinaloa Cartel

=== Central America ===
==== Guatemala ====
- 378 A war of conquest: Tikal against Uaxactun
- 1524–1697 Spanish conquest of Guatemala
- 1530 Alvarado enslaves the Mayan kingdoms of Cakchiquel, Mam, and Ixil.
- 1533–1933 Mexican Indian Wars
- 1811 1811 Independence Movement
- 1823–1838 Federal Republic of Central America Independence and annexation by the Mexican Empire
- 1896–1898 Greater Republic of Central America
- 1920 Tragic Week of 1920
- 1921 1921 Guatemalan coup d'état
- 1930 1930 Guatemalan coup d'état
- 1944 Guatemalan Revolution of 1944
- 1954 1954 Guatemalan coup d'état
- 1957 1957 Guatemalan coup d'état
- 1958 – 1959 Mexico–Guatemala conflict
- 1960 – 1996 Guatemalan Civil War
  - 1960 – 1996 Guatemalan genocide
  - 1963 1963 Guatemalan coup d'état
  - 1982 1982 Guatemalan coup d'état
  - 1983 1983 Guatemalan coup d'état
  - 1989 1989 Guatemalan coup attempt
  - 1993 1993 Guatemalan constitutional crisis
- 2016 2016 Belize–Guatemala border standoff

==== Nicaragua ====
- 1844–1845 Malespín's War
- 1855–1857 Filibuster War
- 1894–1895 Nicaragua Crisis of 1894–1895
- 1898–1934 Banana Wars
  - September 19, 1912 Battle of Masaya
  - October 3–4, 1912 Battle of Coyotepe Hill
  - May 16, 1927 Battle of La Paz Centro
  - July 16, 1927 Battle of Ocotal
  - July 25, 1927 Battle of San Fernando
  - July 27, 1927 Battle of Santa Clara
  - September 19, 1927 Battle of Telpaneca
  - October 9, 1927 Battle of Sapotillal
  - January 1, 1928 Battle of Las Cruces
  - February 27–28, 1928 Battle of El Bramadero
  - May 13–14, 1928 Battle of La Flor
  - December 31, 1930 Battle of Achuapa
  - September 16, 1932 Battle of Agua Carta
  - December 26, 1932 Battle of El Sauce
- 1926–1927 Nicaraguan civil war
- 1936 1936 Nicaraguan coup d'état
- 1947 1947 Nicaraguan coup d'état
- 1961 – 1990 Nicaraguan Revolution

==== Costa Rica ====
- 1823 Ochomogo War
- 1835 League War
- 1870 1870 Costa Rican coup d'état
- 1921 Costa Rica fight Panama in the Coto War
- 1948 Costa Rican Civil War
- 1955 Calderonista invasion of Costa Rica

==== El Salvador ====
- 1533 — 1933 Mexican Indian Wars
- 1845 Honduran-Salvadoran War of 1845
- 1846 1846 Salvadoran coup attempt
- 1871 Honduran-Salvadoran War of 1871
- 1885 Barrios' War of Reunification
  - April 1–2, 1885 Battle of Chalchuapa
- 1885 Menéndez's revolution
- 1890 1890 Salvadoran coup d'état
- 1894 Revolution of the 44
- 1907 War of 1907
- 1927 1927 Salvadoran coup attempt
- 1931 1931 Salvadoran coup d'état
- 1944 April 1944 Salvadoran coup attempt
- 1944 October 1944 Salvadoran coup d'état
- 1960 1960 Salvadoran coup d'état
- 1961 1961 Salvadoran coup d'état
- 1969 Football War
- 1972 1972 Salvadoran coup attempt
- 1979 – 1992 Salvadoran Civil War
  - October 15, 1979 1979 Salvadoran coup d'état
  - January 10 – 26, 1981 Final offensive of 1981 (El Salvador)
    - January 1981 Battle of Ilopango Airport
  - November 11 – 12, 1989 Final offensive of 1989
- 2022 – present Salvadoran gang crackdown

==== Honduras ====
- 1533 — 1933 Mexican Indian Wars
- 1826 — 1829 First Central American Civil War
  - May 10, 1827 1827 Honduran coup d'état
  - November 11, 1827 Battle of La Trinidad
- 1831 — 1832 Domínguez's expedition to Honduras
- 1845 Honduran-Salvadoran War of 1845
- 1860 — 1861 War of the Priests
- 1871 Honduran–Salvadoran War of 1871
- 1956 1956 Honduran coup d'état
- 1963 1963 Honduran coup d'état
- 1969 Football War
- 1972 1972 Honduran coup d'état
- 1975 1975 Honduran coup d'état
- 1978 1978 Honduran coup d'état
- 1988 Operation Golden Pheasant
- 2009 2009 Honduran coup d'état
- 2022 – present Honduran gang crackdown

==== Panama ====
- 1921 Coto War, between Panama and Costa Rica
- 1951 1951 Panamanian coup d'état
- 1959 Cuban invasion of Panama
- 1968 1968 Panamanian coup d'état
- 1968 — 1971 Insurgency in Chiriquí
- 1988 1988 Panamanian coup attempt
- 1989 1989 Panamanian coup attempt
- 1989 — 1990 United States invasion of Panama
  - December 20, 1989 Capture of Torrijos Airport
  - December 20, 1989 Operation Acid Gambit
  - December 20, 1989 Raid at Renacer Prison
  - December 20, 1989 Battle of Rio Hato Airfield
  - December 20, 1989 Battle of Paitilla Airport
  - December 20–23, 1989 Operation Nifty Package

==== Belize ====
- 1533–1933 Mexican Indian Wars
- 2016 2016 Belize–Guatemala border standoff

== Caribbean ==
All conflicts which occurred on the islands in the Caribbean Sea are listed here. US Territories such as Puerto Rico and the US Virgin Islands are exceptions to this rule as they included in the United States' Section.

=== Dominican Republic ===
- 1519–1533 Enriquillo rebelled against the Spaniards
- December 25, 1521 Santo Domingo Slave Revolt
- 1532–1547 Maroon rebellion of Sebastian Lemba
- 1585–1604 Anglo-Spanish War
  - January 1, 1586 Battle of Santo Domingo
- 1808–1809 Spanish reconquest of Santo Domingo
- December 1, 1821 Independence of Republic of Spanish Haiti
- 1822–1844 Haitian occupation of Santo Domingo
- 1844–1856 Dominican War of Independence
  - March 19, 1844 Battle of Azua
  - April 15, 1844 Battle of Tortuguero
  - September 17, 1845 Battle of Estrelleta
  - October 27, 1845 Battle of Beler
  - April 17, 1849 Battle of El Número
  - April 21, 1849 Battle of Las Carreras
  - December 22, 1855 Battle of Santomé and Battle of Cambronal
  - January 24, 1856 Battle of Sabana Larga
- 1844 Dominican coup of 18 Brumaire
- 1857–1858 Cibaeño Revolution
- 1861–1865 Spanish annexation of the Dominican Republic
  - 1863–1865 Dominican Restoration War
- 1868–1874 Six Years' War
  - 1869–1871 Proposed United States annexation of Santo Domingo
- February 1–11, 1904 Santo Domingo Affair
- 1916–1924 United States occupation of the Dominican Republic
- 1930 1930 Dominican coup d'état
- 1947 Cayo Confites affair
- 1959 1959 Dominican Republic invasion attempt
- 1961 Rebellion of the Pilots
- 1963 1963 Dominican coup d'état
- 1965 – 1966 Dominican Civil War
  - April 27, 1965 Battle of Duarte Bridge
  - May 13 – 21, 1965 Operation Limpieza

=== Cuba ===
- 1524–1530 Guamá led a rebellion against Spanish rule in Cuba
- 1568–1648 Eighty Years' War
  - September 7–8, 1628 Battle in the Bay of Matanzas
- October 10, 1868 – 1878 Ten Years' War
- April 25 – August 12, 1898 Spanish–American War
  - April 25, 1898 Action of 25 April 1898
  - May 8, 1898 First Battle of Cárdenas
  - May 11, 1898 Battle of Cárdenas
  - May 11, 1898 Battle of Cienfuegos
  - June 6–10, 1898 Battle of Guantánamo Bay
  - June 13, 1898 Action of 13 June 1898
  - June 24, 1898 Battle of Las Guasimas
  - June 30, 1898 First Battle of Manzanillo
  - June 30, 1898 Battle of Tayacoba
  - July 1, 1898 Battle of the Aguadores
  - July 1, 1898 Battle of El Caney
  - July 1, 1898 Battle of San Juan Hill
  - July 1, 1898 Second Battle of Manzanillo
  - July 3, 1898 Battle of Santiago de Cuba
  - July 3–17, 1898 Siege of Santiago
  - July 18, 1898 Third Battle of Manzanillo
  - July 21, 1898 Battle of Nipe Bay
  - July 23, 1898 Battle of Rio Manimani
- 1898–1934 Banana Wars
- 1906–1909 United States occupation of Cuba
- 1912 Negro Rebellion
- 1917–1922 Sugar Intervention
- 1952 1952 Cuban coup d'état
- 1953 – 1959 Cuban Revolution
  - July 26, 1953 Attack on Moncada Barracks
  - November 26 – December 2, 1956 Landing of the Granma
  - November 30, 1956 Santiago de Cuba Uprising
  - December 5, 1956 Battle of Alegría de Pío
  - January 17, 1957 Battle of La Plata (1957)
  - March 13, 1957 Havana Presidential Palace attack (1957)
  - April 20, 1957 Humboldt 7 massacre
  - May 19 – 28, 1957 Corynthia expedition
  - May 28, 1957 Attack on El Uvero
  - April 9 – 10, 1958 April 9 Cuban strike
  - June 28 – August 8, 1958 Operation Verano
    - July 11 – 21, 1958 Battle of La Plata
    - July 29 – August 8, 1958 Battle of Las Mercedes
  - November 20, 1958 Battle of Guisa
  - December 19 – 30, 1958 Battle of Yaguajay
  - December 28, 1958 – January 1, 1959 Battle of Santa Clara
  - January 1, 1959 Triumph of the Revolution
- 1959 – 1965 Escambray Rebellion
- 1961 Bay of Pigs Invasion
- 1962 Cuban Missile Crisis

=== Saint Martin ===
- 1568–1648 Eighty Years' War
  - June 1633 Capture of Saint Martin
  - 1644 Attack on Saint Martin

=== Tobago ===
- 1672–1678 Franco-Dutch War
  - March 1677 Action of March 1677
- 1990 Jamaat al Muslimeen coup attempt

=== Haiti ===
- April 20, 1792 – March 25, 1802 French Revolutionary Wars
  - 1791–1804 Haitian Revolution
    - 1799 War of Knives
    - 1801 Battle of Ravine-à-Couleuvres
    - 4–24 March 1802 Battle of Crête-à-Pierrot
    - November 18, 1803 Battle of Vertières

Political evolution of Central America and the Caribbean

- 1807 – 1820 Haitian Civil War of 1807–1820

- 1820 Haitian revolution

- 1842 – 1843 1843 Haitian revolution
- 1858 – 1859 1859 Haitian revolution
- 1865 Haitian Civil War of 1865
- 1867 – 1869 Haitian Civil War of 1867–1869
- 1876 1876 Haitian revolution
- 1883 – 1884 Haitian Civil War of 1883–1884
- 1888 – 1889 Haitian Civil War of 1888–1889
- 1902 Haitian Civil War of 1902

- Markomannia incident

- 1908 1908 Haitian revolution
- 1911 – 1915 Cacos revolts (pre–U.S. occupation phase)

- 1911 1911 Haitian revolution
- January 1914 January 1914 Haitian coup d'état
- October 1914 October 1914 Haitian coup d'état
- February 1915 1915 Haitian coup d'état
- July 1915 1915 Haitian revolution

- July 28, 1915 – August 1, 1934 United States occupation of Haiti

- October 24–25, 1915 Battle of Fort Dipitie
- November 17, 1915 Battle of Fort Rivière
- October 6 or 7, 1919 Battle of Port-au-Prince (1919)
- January 15, 1920 Battle of Port-au-Prince (1920)

- October 1937 Parsley Massacre
- 1950 1950 Haitian coup d'état
- 1958 July 1958 Haitian coup attempt
- 1970 1970 Haitian coup attempt
- 1988 June 1988 Haitian coup d'état
- 1988 September 1988 Haitian coup d'état
- 1989 1989 Haitian coup attempt
- 1991 1991 Haitian coup d'etat
- 1994 – 1995 Operation Uphold Democracy
- 2001 2001 Haitian coup attempt
- 2004 2004 Haitian coup d'état
- 2007 Cité Soleil raid of 2007
- 2018 – present Haitian crisis (2018–present)
  - 2020 – present Gang war in Haiti
    - April 24 – May 6, 2022 Battle of Plaine du Cul-de-Sac
    - July 8 – 9, 2022 2022 Port-au-Prince gang battles
    - February 28, 2024 – present Battle of Port-au-Prince (2024)

=== Jamaica ===
- 1654–1660 Anglo-Spanish War
  - May 19–27, 1655 Invasion of Jamaica
- 1934–1939 British West Indian labour unrest
- 1943 – present Jamaican political conflict
  - 2010 2010 Kingston unrest

=== Grenada ===
- 1983 Invasion of Grenada

=== Anguilla ===
- 1969 Operation Sheepskin

== South America ==
=== Argentina ===
- c. 1472–1493 Topa Inca Yupanqui, the tenth Sapa Inca of the Inca Empire, extended the realm northward along the Andes through modern Ecuador, and developed a special fondness for the city of Quito, which he rebuilt with architects from Cuzco. During this time his father Pachacuti reorganized the Kingdom of Cuzco into the Tahuantinsuyu, the "four provinces". He led extensive military conquests to extend the Inca Empire across much of South America, within the boundaries of the nations which are today called Peru, Bolivia, Chile, and Argentina. He became Inca in his turn upon his father's death in 1471, ruling until his own death in 1493. He conquered Chimor, which occupied the northern coast of what is now Peru, the largest remaining rival to the Incas.
- c. 1493–1527 Huayna Capac, the eleventh Sapa Inca of the Inca Empire, extended the Inca Empire significantly to the south into present-day Chile and Argentina and tried to annex territories towards the north, in what is now Ecuador and southern Colombia, founding cities like Atuntaqui. Further north, Huayna Capac's forces reached the Chinchipe River Basin but were pushed back by the Shuar in 1527. The Inca Empire reached the height of its size and power under his rule, stretching over much of present-day Bolivia, Peru, Argentina, Chile, Ecuador and southwestern Colombia. The lands conquered in the south within Bolivia, Argentina, and Chile would form the province Qullasuyu of the Inca Empire.
- 1754 — 1757 Spanish-Portuguese invasion of the Jesuit-sponsored "Guarani Nation"
- 1810 — 1818 Argentine War of Independence
- 1814 — 1880 Argentine Civil Wars
- 1837 — 1839 War between Argentina and Peru–Bolivian Confederation
- 1904 — 1984 Beagle conflict
- 1955 Bombing of Plaza de Mayo
- 1955 Revolución Libertadora
- 1963 1963 Argentine Navy revolt
- 1965 Laguna del Desierto incident
- 1966 Argentine Revolution
- 1976 – 1983 Dirty War
  - February 5, 1975 – September 28, 1977 Operativo Independencia
    - October 10, 1975 Battle of Acheral
  - October 5, 1975 Operation Primicia
  - December 23 – 24, 1975 1975 Monte Chingolo attack
  - 1976 1976 Argentine coup d'état
- 1982 Falklands War
- 1987 — 1990 Carapintadas uprisings
- 1989 1989 attack on La Tablada barracks
- 1990 – present Mapuche conflict

=== Bolivia ===
- c. 500 — c. 1100 Wari Empire
- c. 1472–1493 Topa Inca Yupanqui, the tenth Sapa Inca of the Inca Empire, extended the realm northward along the Andes through modern Ecuador, and developed a special fondness for the city of Quito, which he rebuilt with architects from Cuzco. During this time his father Pachacuti reorganized the Kingdom of Cuzco into the Tahuantinsuyu, the "four provinces". He led extensive military conquests to extend the Inca Empire across much of South America, within the boundaries of the nations which are today called Peru, Bolivia, Chile, and Argentina. He became Inca in his turn upon his father's death in 1471, ruling until his own death in 1493. He conquered Chimor, which occupied the northern coast of what is now Peru, the largest remaining rival to the Incas. The lands conquered in the south within Bolivia, Argentina, and Chile would form the province Qullasuyu of the Inca Empire.
- 1780 — 1782 Rebellion of Túpac Amaru II by indigenous people, mestizos, blacks, and criollos against the Spanish Empire
- 1825 Brazilian invasion of Chiquitos
- 1836 — 1839 War of the Confederation between the Peru-Bolivian Confederation and Chile
- 1879 — 1884 Bolivia and Peru fight Chile in the War of the Pacific
- 1932 — 1935 Chaco War between Bolivia and Paraguay
- 1946 1946 La Paz riots
- 1952 Bolivian National Revolution
- 1964 1964 Bolivian coup d'état
- 1966 — 1967 Ñancahuazú Guerrilla
- 1969 1969 Bolivian coup d'état
- 1970 Teoponte Guerrilla
- 1971 1971 Bolivian coup d'état
- 1978 July 1978 Bolivian coup d'état
- 1979 1979 Bolivian coup d'état
- 1980 1980 Bolivian coup d'état
- 1984 1984 Bolivian coup attempt
- 2008 2008 Bolivian political crisis
- 2024 2024 Bolivian coup attempt

=== Brazil ===
- 1557 — 1575 French-Portuguese conflict over France Antarctique, a French colony in Rio de Janeiro.
- 1591 — Thomas Cavendish, a British corsair, occupied Santos
- 1821 — 1825 Brazilian War of Independence
- 1835 — Malê Revolt
- 1835 — 1845 Republican revolt against the Empire of Brazil is put down in the Ragamuffin War
- 1896 — 1897 War of Canudos
- 1912 — 1916 Contestado War, a rebellion in Brazil, fails.
- 1932 — 1932 Constitutionalist Revolution, a failed uprising centered in São Paulo, Brazil
- 1959 Aragarças Revolt
- 1961 – 1963 Lobster War
- 1964 1964 Brazilian coup d'état
- 1964 – 1985 Armed struggle against the Brazilian military dictatorship
- 1966 – 1975 Araguaia Guerrilla War
- 1991 Operation Traira
- 2006 2006 São Paulo violence outbreak
- 2006 – present Armed conflict for control of the favelas
- 2010 2010 Rio de Janeiro security crisis
- 2016 – present Brazilian drug war
- 2016 Agricultural Penitentiary of Monte Cristo riot
- 2017 2017 Military Police of Espírito Santo strike
- 2021 2021 Rio de Janeiro shootout
- 2022 Vila Cruzeiro shootout

=== Chile ===
- c. 500 — c. 1100 Wari Empire
- c. 1472–1493 Topa Inca Yupanqui, the tenth Sapa Inca of the Inca Empire, extended the realm northward along the Andes through modern Ecuador, and developed a special fondness for the city of Quito, which he rebuilt with architects from Cuzco. During this time his father Pachacuti reorganized the Kingdom of Cuzco into the Tahuantinsuyu, the "four provinces". He led extensive military conquests to extend the Inca Empire across much of South America, within the boundaries of the nations which are today called Peru, Bolivia, Chile, and Argentina. He became Inca in his turn upon his father's death in 1471, ruling until his own death in 1493. He conquered Chimor, which occupied the northern coast of what is now Peru, the largest remaining rival to the Incas.
- c. 1493–1527 Huayna Capac, the eleventh Sapa Inca of the Inca Empire, extended the Inca Empire significantly to the south into present-day Chile and Argentina and tried to annex territories towards the north, in what is now Ecuador and southern Colombia, founding cities like Atuntaqui. Further north, Huayna Capac's forces reached the Chinchipe River Basin but were pushed back by the Shuar in 1527. The Inca Empire reached the height of its size and power under his rule, stretching over much of present-day Bolivia, Peru, Argentina, Chile, Ecuador and southwestern Colombia. The lands conquered in the south within Bolivia, Argentina, and Chile would form the province Qullasuyu of the Inca Empire.
- 1535 — 1537 Expedition to Chile of the Spanish conqueror Diego de Almagro.

- 1536 Battle of Reynogüelén

- 16th century — 17th or 18th century Arauco War

- 1546 Battle of Quilacura
- 1550 Battle of Andalien
- 1550 Battle of Penco
- 1553 Battle of Tucapel
- 1554 Battle of Marihueñu
- 1556 Battle of Peteroa
- 1557 Battle of Mataquito
- 1557 Battle of Lagunillas
- 1557 Battle of Millarapue
- 1558 Battle of Quiapo
- 1564 Siege of Concepcion
- 1564 Battle of Angol
- 1569 Battle of Catirai
- 1598 Disaster of Curalaba
- 1599 — 1604 Destruction of the Seven Cities
- 1612 Defensive War
- 1655 Mapuche Insurrection
- 1712 Huilliche rebellion
- 1723 The Mapuche Uprising
- 1759, 1766, and 1769 The Mapuche Rebellions
- 1792 Huilliche Rebellion of 1792

- 1810 — 1826 Chilean War of Independence
- 1829 — 1830 Chilean Civil War
- 1836 — 1839 War of the Confederation between the Peru-Bolivian Confederation and Chile
- 1851 Chilean Revolution
- 1861 — 1883 Occupation of Araucanía
- 1864 — 1866 The Chincha Islands War between Spain and former colonies Peru and Chile occurs
- 1879 — 1884 Bolivia and Peru fight Chile in the War of the Pacific
- 1891 1891 Chilean Civil War
- 1973 Tanquetazo
- 1973 1973 Chilean coup d'etat
- 1973 – 1988 Armed resistance in Chile (1973–1990)
- 1990 – present Mapuche conflict

=== Colombia ===
- c. 1493–1527 Huayna Capac, the eleventh Sapa Inca of the Inca Empire, extended the Inca Empire significantly to the south into present-day Chile and Argentina and tried to annex territories towards the north, in what is now Ecuador and southern Colombia, founding cities like Atuntaqui. Further north, Huayna Capac's forces reached the Chinchipe River Basin but were pushed back by the Shuar in 1527. The Inca Empire reached the height of its size and power under his rule, stretching over much of present-day Bolivia, Peru, Argentina, Chile, Ecuador and southwestern Colombia. The lands conquered in the north within Peru, Ecuador, and Colombia would form the province Chinchay Suyu of the Inca Empire.
- 1470 – 1490 Muisca warfare
- 1499 – 1602 Spanish conquest of the Chibchan Nations
- 1537 – 1539 Spanish conquest of the Muisca
- 1828 – 1829 Gran Colombia–Peru War
- 1860 – 1862 Colombian Civil War
- 1899 – 1902 Colombian Thousand Days' War
  - 1900 1900 Colombian coup d'état
- 1932 – 1933 Colombia–Peru War
- 1948 – 1958 La Violencia
  - April 9, 1948 Bogotazo
  - 1953 1953 Colombian coup d'état
  - 1957 1957 Colombian coup d'état
- 1964 – present Colombian conflict
  - February 27 – April 27, 1980 1980 Dominican Republic Embassy siege in Bogotá
  - November 6 – 7, 1985 Palace of Justice siege
  - February – March, 1991 Operation Traira
  - November 1 – 4, 1998 Siege of Mitú
  - April 2004 – December 2006 Operation JM
  - July 2, 2008 Operation Jaque
  - July 20 – 21, 2013 2013 Colombian clashes
  - 2018 – ongoing Catatumbo campaign
  - January 2, 2022 2022 Arauca clashes

=== Ecuador ===
- c. 1471–1493 Topa Inca Yupanqui, the tenth Sapa Inca of the Inca Empire, extended the realm northward along the Andes through modern Ecuador, and developed a special fondness for the city of Quito, and conquered Chimor
- c. 1493–1527 Huayna Capac, the eleventh Sapa Inca of the Inca Empire, extended the Inca Empire significantly to the south into present-day Chile and Argentina and tried to annex territories towards the north, in what is now Ecuador and southern Colombia, founding cities like Atuntaqui. Further north, Huayna Capac's forces reached the Chinchipe River Basin but were pushed back by the Shuar in 1527. The Inca Empire reached the height of its size and power under his rule, stretching over much of present-day Bolivia, Peru, Argentina, Chile, Ecuador and southwestern Colombia. The lands conquered in the north within Peru, Ecuador, and Colombia would form the province Chinchay Suyu of the Inca Empire.
- 1809–1812 Quito Revolution (1809–1812)
- 1820–1822 Ecuadorian War of Independence
- 1925 July Revolution (Ecuador)
- 1911–1912 Ecuadorian Civil War of 1911–1912
- 1913–1916 Ecuadorian Civil War of 1913–1916
- 1941 Ecuadorian–Peruvian War
- 1963 1963 Ecuadorian coup d'état
- 1972 1972 Ecuadorian coup d'état
- 1975 1975 Ecuadorian coup attempt
- 1981 Paquisha War
- 1995 Cenepa War
- 2000 2000 Ecuadorian coup d'état
- 2018–present War on drugs in Ecuador
  - 2020–present Ecuadorian security crisis
    - 2024–present Ecuadorian conflict (2024–present)
- 2024 2024 raid on the Mexican embassy in Ecuador

=== French Guiana ===
- 1667 Capture of Cayenne
- 1809–1817 Portuguese conquest and occupation of French Guiana
- 1895 Amapá Question

=== Peru ===
- c. 900 BCE – c. 200 BCE Chavín culture

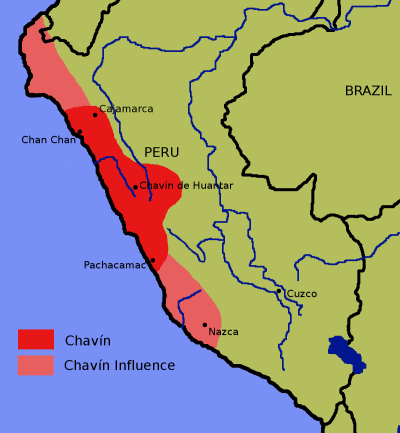
The area of the Chavín culture, as well as areas the Chavín culture influenced.

- c. 500 – c. 1100 CE Wari Empire

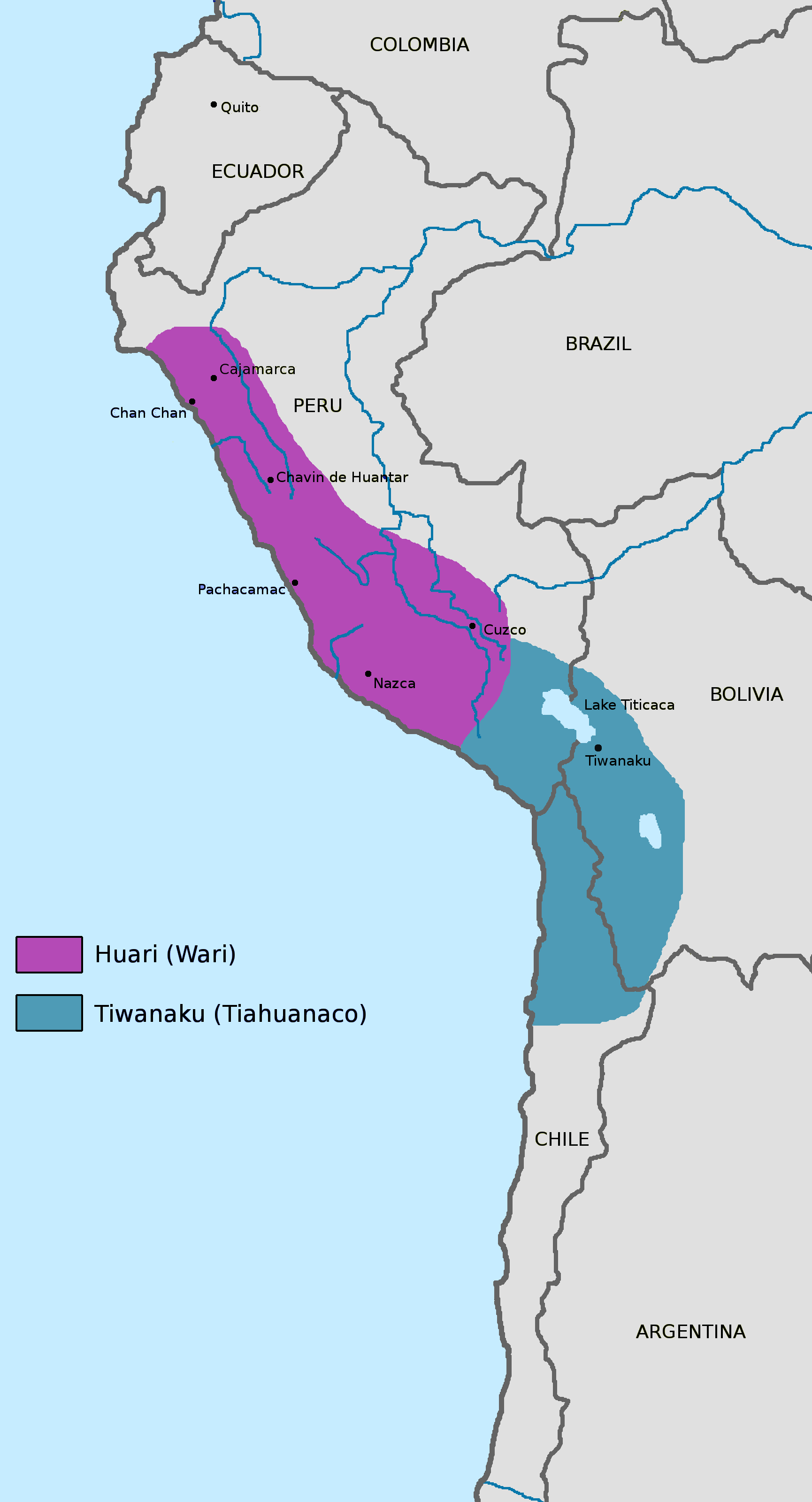
A map of the extent of the Wari Empire

- c. 1230 Sinchi Roca, the second Sapa Inca of the Kingdom of Cuzco, waged war against a nearby kingdom after the killing of the Inca diplomat Teuotihi
- c. 1290 Mayta Cápac, the fourth Sapa Inca of the Kingdom of Cuzco, put the regions of Arequipa and Moquegua under the control of the Inca empire
- c. 1320 Cápac Yupanqui, the fifth Sapa Inca of the Kingdom of Cuzco, was the first Inca to conquer territory outside the valley of Cuzco
- c. 1350 – c. 1380 Inca Roca, the sixth Sapa Inca of the Kingdom of Cuzco, is said to have conquered the Chancas
- c. 1380 Yáhuar Huácac, the seventh Sapa Inca of the Kingdom of Cuzco, abandoned the capital in an attack by the Chancas
- c. 1410 – c. 1438 Viracocha Inca, the eighth Sapa Inca of the Kingdom of Cuzco, defended the capital against the attack by the Chancas
- c. 1438 – c. 1472 Pachacuti, the ninth Sapa Inca of the Kingdom of Cuzco, defeated the Chancas and the Chimú

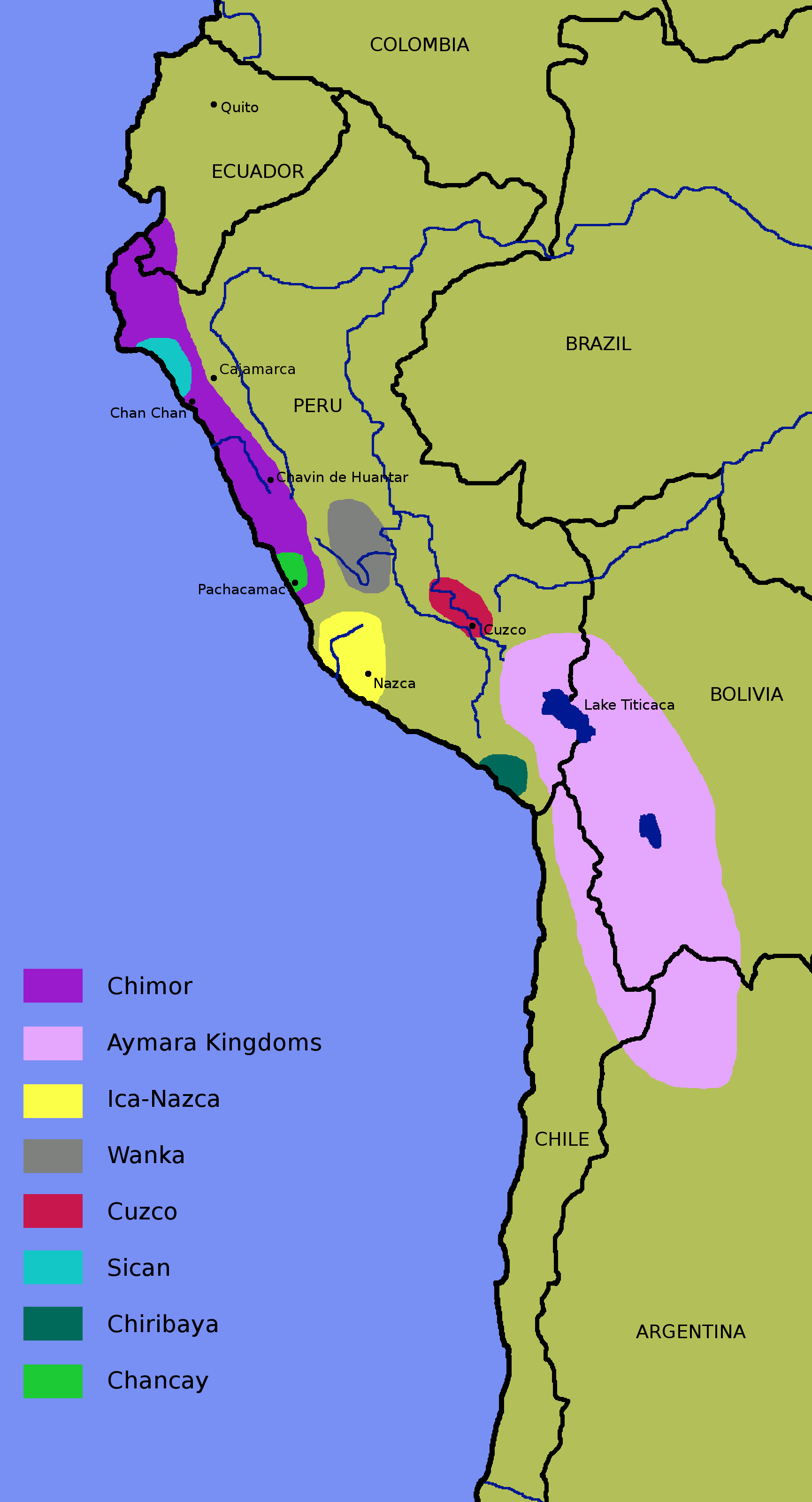
A map of the extent of the Kingdom of Cuzco in 1438

- c. 1472 – c. 1493 Topa Inca Yupanqui, the tenth Sapa Inca of the Inca Empire, extended the realm northward along the Andes through modern Ecuador, and developed a special fondness for the city of Quito, which he rebuilt with architects from Cuzco. During this time his father Pachacuti reorganized the Kingdom of Cuzco into the Tahuantinsuyu, the "four provinces". He led extensive military conquests to extend the Inca Empire across much of South America, within the boundaries of the nations which are today called Peru, Bolivia, Chile, and Argentina. He became Inca in his turn upon his father's death in 1471, ruling until his own death in 1493. He conquered Chimor, which occupied the northern coast of what is now Peru, the largest remaining rival to the Incas.
- c. 1493 – c. 1527 Huayna Capac, the eleventh Sapa Inca of the Inca Empire, extended the Inca Empire significantly to the south into present-day Chile and Argentina and tried to annex territories towards the north, in what is now Ecuador and southern Colombia, founding cities like Atuntaqui. Further north, Huayna Capac's forces reached the Chinchipe River Basin but were pushed back by the Shuar in 1527. The Inca Empire reached the height of its size and power under his rule, stretching over much of present-day Bolivia, Peru, Argentina, Chile, Ecuador and southwestern Colombia.

A map of the Inca Empire at its greatest extent

- c. 1529 – c. 1532 Inca Civil War

- 1529 Battle of Chillopampa
- 1531 Battle of Mullihambato
- 1531 Battle of Chimborazo, war between Atahualpa and Huascar.
- 1532 Battle of Huanucopampa
- 1532 Battle of Quipaipan

- 1525–1572 Spanish conquest of the Inca Empire

- 1525 Battle of Punta Quemada
- 1531 Battle of Puná
- 1532 Battle of Cajamarca
- 1533 Battle of Vilcaconga
- 1533 Battle of Cuzco
- 1534 Battle of Maraycalla
- 1534 Battle of Mount Chimborazo
- 1536 Siege of Cuzco
- 1537 Battle of Ollantaytambo
- 1537 Battle of Abancay
- 1538 Battle of Las Salinas
- 1542 Battle of Chupas
- 1546 Battle of Añaquito
- 1547 Battle of Huarina
- 1548 Battle of Jaquijahuana
- 1572 Final war with Spain

- 1780–1782 Rebellion of Túpac Amaru II
- 1812–1821 Peruvian War of Independence
- 1821–1998 Ecuadorian–Peruvian territorial dispute
- 1823 Balconcillo mutiny
- 1836–1839 War of the Confederation
- 1837–1839 War between Argentina and Peru–Bolivian Confederation
- 1872 Gutiérrez Brothers' rebellion
- 1879–1884 War of the Pacific
- 1909 1909 Peruvian coup attempt
- 1914 1914 Peruvian coup d'état
- 1919 1919 Peruvian coup d'état
- 1930 1930 Peruvian coup d'état
- 1932–1933 Leticia Incident with Colombia
- 1941–1942 Ecuadorian–Peruvian War
- 1948 1948 Peruvian coup d'état
- 1962 1962 Peruvian coup d'état
- 1968 1968 Peruvian coup d'état
- 1975 Limazo
- 1975 Tacnazo
- 1980–present Internal conflict in Peru
  - March 2, 1982 Assault of Ayacucho prison
  - 1992 1992 Peruvian self-coup
  - 1992 1992 Peruvian coup attempt
  - April 2, 1997 Operation Chavín de Huántar
  - 29 October 2000 Locumba uprising
  - January 1–4, 2005 Andahuaylazo
  - July 17, 2017 Llochegua Clashes
- 1981 Paquisha War
- 1995 Cenepa war
- 2009 2009 Peruvian political crisis
- 2022 2022 Peruvian self-coup attempt

=== Paraguay ===
- 1864–1870 Paraguayan War
- 1911–1912 Paraguayan Civil War (1911–1912)
- 1922–1923 Paraguayan Civil War (1922–1923)
- 1932–1935 Chaco War
- 1947 Paraguayan Civil War (1947)
- 1954 1954 Paraguayan coup d'état
- 1989 1989 Paraguayan coup d'état
- 1996 1996 Paraguayan coup attempt
- 2000 2000 Paraguayan coup attempt
- 2005–present Paraguayan People's Army insurgency

=== Uruguay ===
- 1820–1828 Cisplatine War
- 1839–1851 Uruguayan Civil War
- 1851–1852 Platine War
- 1864–1865 Uruguayan War
- 1865–1870 Paraguayan War
- 1870–1872 Revolution of the Lances
- 1903–1904 Aparicio Saravia revolt
- 1969 Taking of Pando
- 1972–1973 Uruguayan intrastate war
- 1973 1973 Uruguayan coup d'état

=== Venezuela ===
- 1567 Battle of Maracapana
- 1811–1823 Venezuelan War of Independence
- 1858 March Revolution
- 1859–1863 Federal War
  - December 9–10, 1859 Battle of Santa Inés
  - February 17, 1860 Battle of Coplé
  - August 29, 1861 1861 Venezuelan coup d'état
- 1892 Legalist Revolution
- 1899 Restorative Liberal Revolution
- 1908 Dutch–Venezuelan crisis of 1908
- 1908 1908 Venezuelan coup d'état
- 1945 1945 Venezuelan coup d'état
- 1948 1948 Venezuelan coup d'état
- 1958 1958 Venezuelan coup d'état
- 1961 El Barcelonazo
- 1962 El Carupanazo
- 1962 El Porteñazo
- 1967 Machurucuto raid
- 1992 February 1992 Venezuelan coup attempt
- 1992 November 1992 Venezuelan coup attempt
- 2002 2002 Venezuelan coup attempt
- 2010–present Crisis in Venezuela
  - August 6, 2017 Attack on Fort Paramacay
  - January 15, 2018 El Junquito raid
  - 2018–present Pemon conflict
  - April 30, 2019 2019 Venezuelan uprising attempt
  - May 3–4, 2020 Operation Gideon (2020)
  - March 21, 2021 – January 2022 Apure clashes

=== Suriname ===
- 1804 Battle of Suriname
- 1980 1980 Surinamese coup d'état
- 1986–1992 Surinamese Interior War
- 1990 1990 Surinamese coup d'état

=== Guyana ===
- 1712 Cassard expedition
- 1763–1764 Berbice Rebellion
- 1823 Demerara rebellion of 1823
- 1969 Rupununi uprising

== See also ==
- Colonization of the Americas
- Military history of Mexico
- Revolutions of Brazil
- Military history of North America
- List of conflicts in North America
- List of conflicts in Central America
- List of conflicts in South America
