= April 9 Cuban strike =

General strike in Cuba on 9–10 April, 1958

April 9 strike
- Part of Cuban Revolution
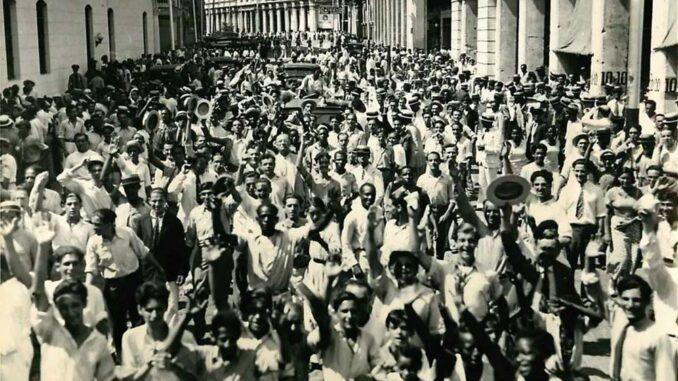
- Strikers on April 9, 1958
- Date: 9-10 April 1958
- Location: Cuba
- Caused by: political repression
- Goals: overthrow the dictatorship of Fulgencio Batista
- Methods: armed attacks, propaganda, stoppage of work, protesting
- Result: Strike failed: strike did not materialize and lost momentum

Parties
Republic of Cuba	Workers; Students; 26th of July Movement; Directorio Revolucionario

Lead figures
Fulgencio Batista	Fidel Castro; Juan Marinello; Marcelo Salado †; Raúl Castro; Juan Almeida Bosque

Number
Unknown	hundreds of soldiers and workers

Casualties and losses
Unknown	at least 100 soldiers killed

Casualties
- Death: hundreds of fatalities due to political repression

The April 9 strike was a general strike organized and called upon by M-26-7 via radio, lasting from April 9 to 10th 1958. It spanned across Cuba and eventually the strike lost momentum and died out mid-day on April 10. 100 soldiers died in the strike due to political repression by the Fulgencio Batista government of Cuba.

== Background ==
=== Guerrilla war: 1956–1959 ===
Before the strike, anti government activity had been strong on the island, with the M-26-7 conducting bombings and sabotage. Police responded with mass arrests, torture, and extrajudicial executions. In March 1957, the DRE launched a failed attack on the presidential palace, during which José Antonio Echeverría, a lead figure of the Revolutionary Directorate of 13 March Movement (DRE) was shot dead. Batista's government often resorted to brutal methods to keep Cuba's cities under control. Castro's guerrillas increased their attacks on military outposts, forcing the government to withdraw from the Sierra Maestra region, and by spring 1958, the rebels controlled a hospital, schools, a printing press, slaughterhouse, land-mine factory and a cigar-making factory. By 1958, Batista was under increasing pressure, a result of his military failures coupled with increasing domestic and foreign criticism surrounding his administration's press censorship, torture, and extrajudicial executions. Influenced by anti-Batista sentiment among their citizens, the US government ceased supplying him with weaponry. The opposition called a general strike, accompanied by armed attacks from the M-26-7. Beginning on 9 April, it received strong support in central and eastern Cuba, but little elsewhere.

== The strike ==
On April 9th, 1958 at about 11:00 AM a radio broadcast was heard across Cuba. An announcer claiming loyalty to M-26-7 said:

"Attention Cubans, this is the 26th of July Movement calling to a Revolutionary General Strike! Today is the day of freedom, the day of the Revolutionary General Strike. Forward, Cubans, as from this moment the final struggle begins in all of Cuba that will only end with the overthrow of the dictatorship! Workers, students, professionals, bosses, join the revolutionary general strike, from this moment".

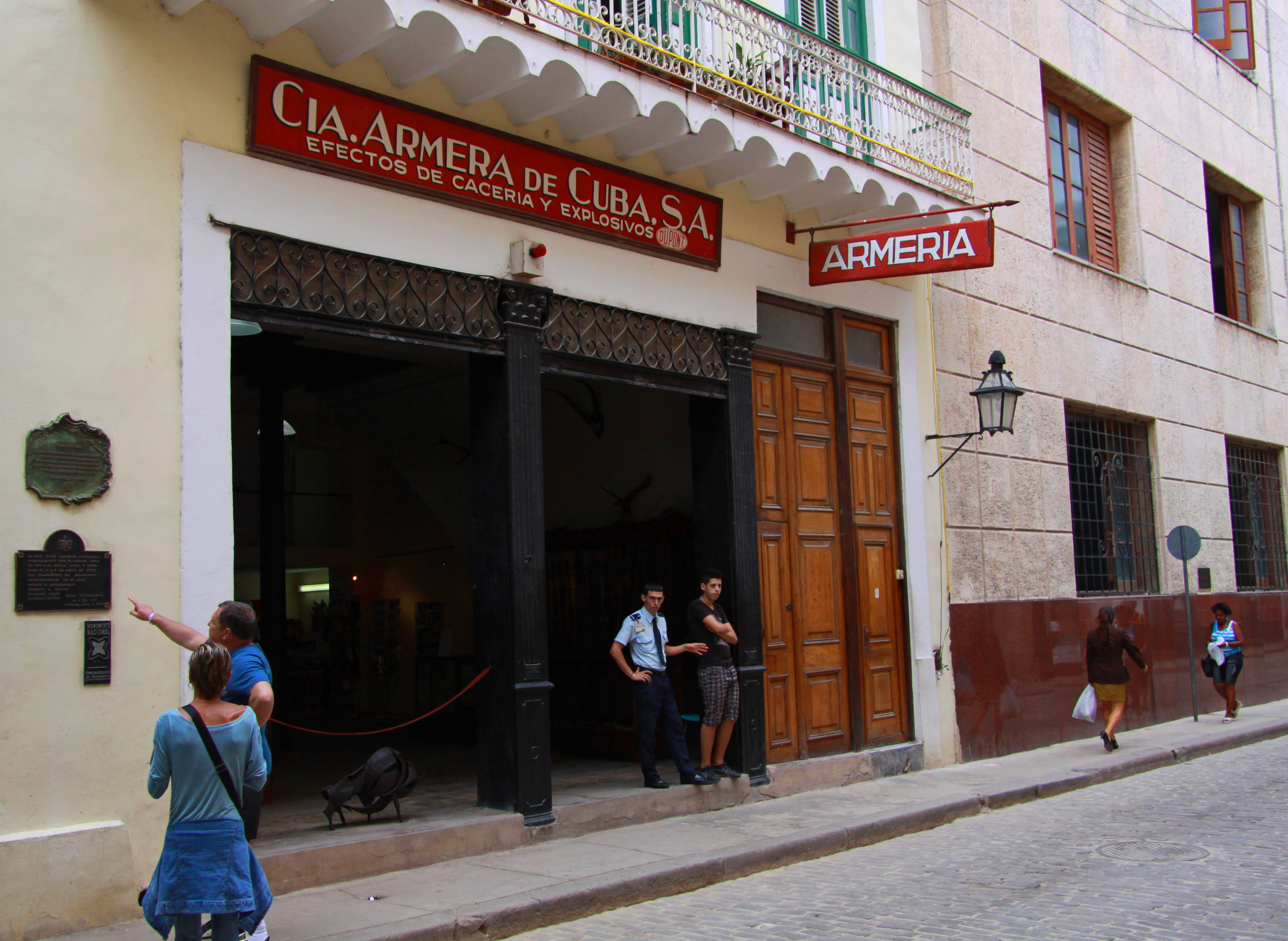
The Museo Armería 9 de Abril, or Armory Museum April 9 is a museum in Old Havana. It was formerly the Old Havana Armory, which was attacked by armed revolutionaries during the April 9 strike.

Throughout the island, the underground struggle gained momentum and spread to towns and cities under the leadership of the 26th of July Movement and with the participation of the “March 13” Revolutionary Directorate and the Popular Socialist Party. In response to the national workers’ strike on April 9, organized by the 26th of July Movement’s leadership, a group of young people from Sagua, armed with knives, revolvers, and shotguns, took to the streets at 11:00 a.m. and subdued Fulgencio Batista’s officers. The purpose of the strike was to unleash a mass movement that would bring about the overthrow of Fulgencio Batista's dictatorship. the strike had its greatest influence in Havana and central Villa Clara province.

=== Killing of Marcelo Salado ===
Marcelo Salado was a Cuban revolutionary who became involved in M-26-7. His first activities took him to Havana, where he joined the 26th of July Movement. Within this organization he carried out important tasks such as kidnapping, protesting and leading the April 9 strike. He was arrested and persecuted several times, but his participation in the struggle did not diminish; on the contrary, his actions expanded to the point of becoming the head of the movement.

=== Death ===
During the April 9 strike, Salado distributed weapons to his comrades and headed toward the Chibás building, where the General Staff was located. From here, news began to arrive about the progress of the strike, much of it not very encouraging. Due to poor organization, there were groups that never received weapons. Others were poorly armed and were massacred by Batista's police. The strike in the urban transport sector also failed. Salado decided to go see his comrades from the National Workers Front (FON), who were located just two blocks away, to find out what had happened in the Transport sector. Lucero ordered a combatant, Ramona Barber, to accompany him. As they walked around the corner, they were recognized by police officers. Salado ordered Ramona to keep walking. A worker at the garage where they were walking pushed her behind a car so that other employees could hide her. The police shot Salado.
