= 1989 Guatemalan coup attempt =

Attempted military coup

On May 9, 1989, an attempted military coup occurred in Guatemala.

== Background ==
The Minister of National Defense, Héctor Gramajo, was not popular among hardliners in the military as he was a loyalist to Arevalo while they wanted a return to Conservative rule. Gramajo was responsible for ending a previous coup a year prior.

That attempted involved President Arevalo conceding to the plotters' demands and granting them amnesty. Despite that, several of the plotters were also involved in the 1989 attempt. Six days prior to the attempt, the national police chief, one of the plotters, resigned after alleging that his superiors were involved in corruption.

== Events ==
Around the dawn of May 9, around 300 soldiers, aided by a helicopter gunship and at least one armed Cessna A-37 Dragonfly, closed all roads leading to the capital, flew over the presidential palace, and surrounded the national police barracks as well as the home of Gramajo. The soldiers also seized the headquarters of Radio TGW, and called repeatedly on national radio for all stations to link up for a national broadcast.

In response, loyalists soldiers from the presidential guard and air forces took up positions and manned artillery pieces, although no shots were fired. The rebels announced that the stations could resume "normal activities" but would have to wait for more information. Loyalist forces confronted the rebels with tanks and armored vehicles, and by 7 a.m., around two hours after the attempt had begun, the coup had ended.

== Reactions and aftermath ==
The U.S. Embassy in Guatemala condemned the coup, stating that it "deplored any attempt to disrupt the constitutional government of Guatemala" and expressed "unreserved support for the democratic process". The White House press secretary, Marlin Fitzwater, praised the government's response, stating that "the armed forces there provided important support for the return to democracy and we hope the military institution will continue to support the constitutional civilian-led democracy".

Following the attempt, the Guatemalan government arrested ten of the twelve individuals it stated were the ringleaders, one of whom was the head of the National Civil Police. Legal proceedings began soon after.
