= 1861 Venezuelan coup d'état =

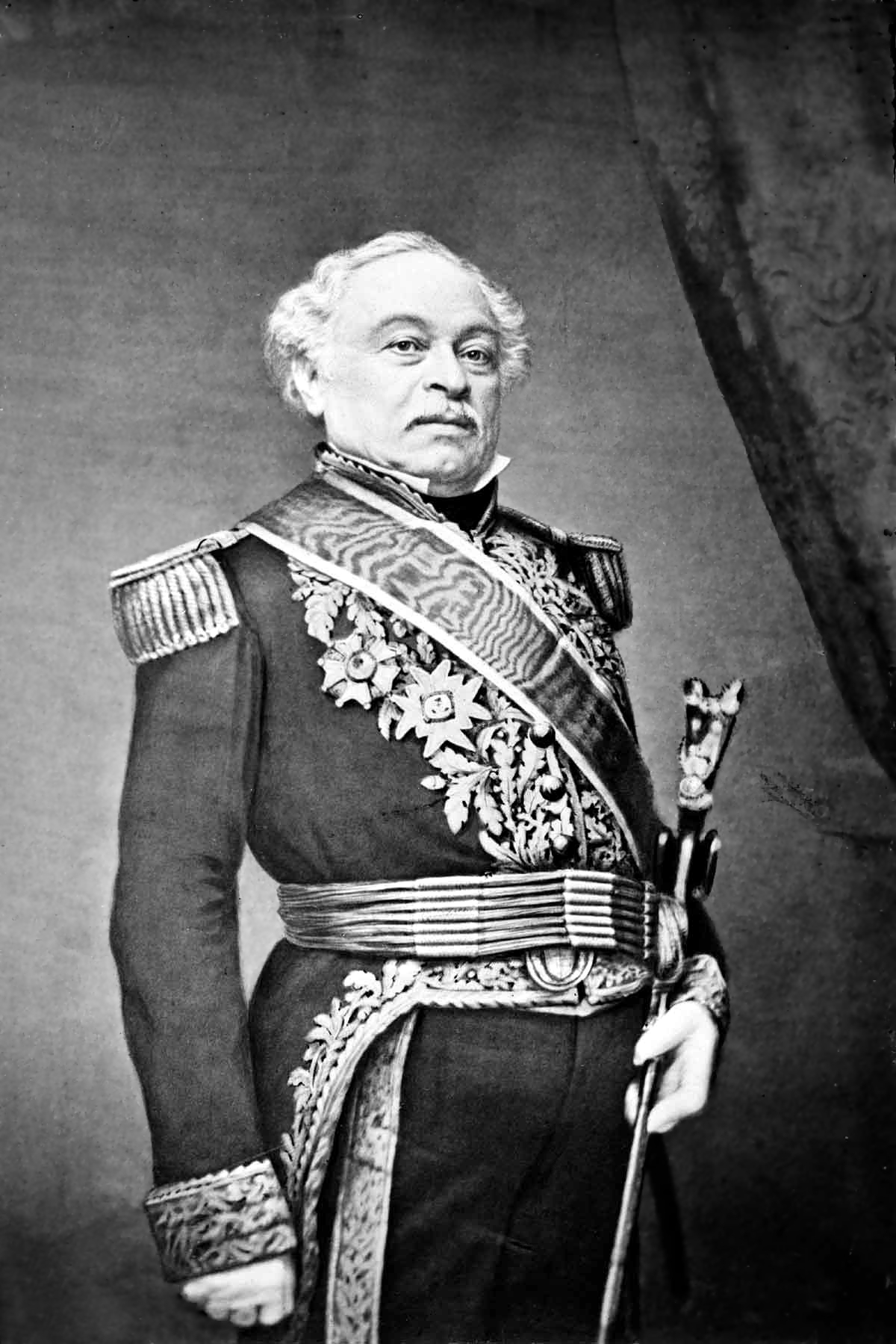
José Antonio Páez

The 1861 Venezuelan coup d'état was a coup d'état carried out by former president José Antonio Páez against the interim government of Pedro Gual from within his own Conservative Party during the Federal War.

== History ==
After the fall of the government of Julián Castro during the Federal War, Pedro Gual and Manuel Felipe de Tovar briefly assumed the presidency of the country. The Conservative Party was divided between those who supported a civilian direction and those who supported a military direction for the nation. José Antonio Páez returned to Venezuela in March 1861; President Tovar resigned and Pedro Gual assumed office again.

On August 19, 1861, a movement of Páez supporters rose up in Valencia against the government of Gual. Colonel Manuel Echezuría then took Caracas with this armed movement and placed President Gual under arrest on the 29th of that month, thus consummating a coup d'état.

After these events, Páez agreed to assume his third government as supreme civil and military chief of Venezuela, governing until 1863.

== See also ==
- Dictatorship of José Antonio Páez
