= 1988 Panamanian coup attempt =

The 1988 Panamanian coup attempt was a failed coup d'état in Panama, led by the country's police chief Colonel Leonidas Macias, which aimed to seize control of the central military headquarters. Allegedly instigated by the United States, the coup attempt led to widespread looting and protests in Panama City which were quelled by paramilitary gangs and security forces. The media faced harassment for covering the failed coup, with several journalists being detained or beaten by the authorities or government supporters.

== Coup attempt ==
The coup attempt followed three weeks of protests by public sector workers over unpaid wages, who staged work stoppages and blockades. In response, the government issued a communique and placed the military in charge of key struck government facilities – the electric power, water and telephone companies, national railroad, and seaports and airports – to mitigate the most severe effects of the strikes.

Amidst escalating anti-government sentiments, Colonel Leonidas Macias along with other dissident officers staged a coup attempt at around 6:30 am on March 16, 1988. Aiming to seize control of the military's central headquarters, the colonel attempted to convince the 4th Infantry Company and riot police leaders through his authority to support the revolt. Despite his best efforts however, the police force remained staunchly loyal to Manuel Noriega. By 7 am, the coup had been thwarted and the headquarters was secured by the Battalion 2000, a specially trained group. The ten officers involved in the coup were arrested and forced into retirement, including Colonels Leonidas Macias, Bernardo Barrera, Majors Fernando Quezada, Aristides Valdonedo, Jaime Benitez, and Captain Humberto Macea. To reassert his authority, Noriega replaced Colonel Leonidas Macias with Colonel Eros Ramios Cal as the new police chief.

== Post-coup ==
Following the coup attempt, the country's capital of Panama City erupted into further protests and riots, leading to widespread street violence and looting. Barricades were erected, cars were burned, and shops were looted. Government forces, using birdshot and tear gas, successfully restored order with the help of paramilitary gangs and plainclothes agents.

Initially denying the coup repeatedly, government spokesman Major Edgardo Lopez finally confirmed the coup later on, calling it a "Kamikaze attack" instigated by the United States by highlighting how most of the coup plotters received recent military training in the US. Meanwhile, about an hour after the aborted coup attempt, a relaxed Noriega appeared at the headquarters building and addressed reporters questioning the gunfire, mocking the attempted coup by saying "They were kisses."

The government repressed the press for covering the abortive coup, detaining three members of a British television crew and an ABC News producer. Additionally, a Mexican television cameraman and two other foreign reporters were beaten by government supporters. Associated Press (AP) reporters were also held at gunpoint before being released, with the soldiers claiming they were participating in a "simulated exercise."
