= 1975 Ecuadorian coup attempt =

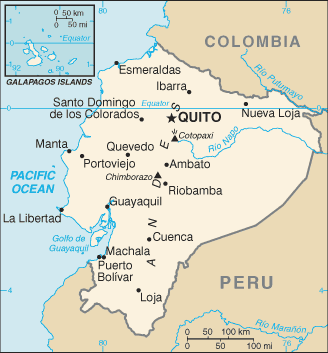
Date	31 August - 1 September 1975
Location	Quito, Ecuador
Result	Failure of the coup attempt: Arrests of Civic Front members; Decline of the Ecuadorian military regime

Belligerents
Government of Ecuador: Ecuadorian Armed Forces	(Ecuador) Dissident faction of the Armed Forces: Civic Front

Commanders and leaders
(Ecuador) Guillermo Rodríguez Lara	(Ecuador) Raúl González Alvear (Ecuador) Alejandro Solís Rosero

Casualties and losses
- 25 in total during the coup

The 1975 Ecuadorian coup attempt also known as Guerra de la Funeraria was a failed military coup d'état in Ecuador led by Ecuadorian Armed Forces Chief Raúl González Alvear along with his brother-in-law, General Alejandro Solís Rosero, director of the National War College, with the goal of forcing President Guillermo Rodríguez Lara to resign. Poorly planned and hastily executed, the coup attempt took place over the course of a two-day period from August 31 - September 1, 1975. By the afternoon, it was clear that the coup had failed with General González seeking asylum, initially from the US Embassy and later the Chilean Embassy, before being captured by government authorities.

== Background ==
In 1972, General Guillermo Rodríguez Lara became Ecuador's dictator through a successful military coup - later known as El Carnavalazo. After his seizure of power, Rodríguez Lara established a military junta of a progressive and reformist nature called the Nationalist Revolutionary Government of the Armed Forces. During his presidency, the Ecuadorian state was strengthened due to oil revenues in the 1970s. President Rodríguez early engaged in a firm campaign to control the nation's oil resources and, in part, to consolidate government authority. The Rodríguez Lara dictatorship was a period of prosperity and investments in several economic areas in Ecuador, mainly in agriculture and infrastructure works. In agriculture, the military regime engaged in a failed agrarian reform project in which less than 1% of the country's cultivable land changed hands. In infrastructure projects, the regime had notable achievements such as the construction of the Esmeraldas refinery. CEPE, a precursor corporation to Petroecuador, was created in 1972. Ecuador joined OPEC in 1973.

By 1974, the country was suffering due to months of economic mismanagement under the Rodriguez regime. Hypernationalistic government ministers had made the mistake of raising oil prices by 54 cents per barrel, above the standard OPEC price and thus upsetting the oil companies, who limited their oil production in protest, cutting into the nation's bottomline. This was severely damaging to Ecuador's economy, as it relied heavily on its exports, including oil.

Despite the economic downturn, the wealthy in Ecuador continued spending lavishly on foreign luxury goods like cars and television sets. The excessive spending caused the country to have a massive trade deficit of $170 million in the first half of 1975. To address the economic crisis, President Rodriguez dismissed his Natural Resources Minister and lowered oil prices by 43 cents per barrel. Additionally, President Rodriguez implemented a heavy 60% tax on all luxury imports, a measure that aimed to stabilize the economy but was deeply unpopular with the public.

The import tax on luxury goods was part of a series of unpopular economic decisions by the regime, including restrictive policies on foreign investment through Andean Pact Decision 24, and the aforementioned petroleum policy which too was unpopular. Coupled with their failure to control inflation and lacking progress in the agricultural sector, the regime's economic policies sparked widespread protests and also open criticism from the chambers of commerce, small industries, editorial boards, politicians, and political parties.

Amidst the political turmoil, a coalition of political parties was formed named the Civic Front to pressure the government into returning to constitutional rule. Comprising Velasquistas, Poncistas, Conservatives, Socialists, and the National Revolutionary Party, the political coalition excluded the country's Communist parties, labeling them as "government parties". Some parties, such as the Radical Liberal Party and the Concentration of Popular Forces, decided not to publicly associate themselves with the Civic Front.

== Coup attempt ==
Considerations for the coup attempt had apparently been brewing in General González's mind for the past two years, yet concrete preparations only began on August 29, 1975, just two days before the planned coup, leading to a rushed and poorly thought-out execution. Motivated by growing public discontent with the Rodriguez regime, he believed this dissatisfaction could be leveraged to gain support for the coup. However, General González misjudged the level of civilian and military support he truly had and made little effort during the pre-coup planning to secure the backing of several military officers who were reportedly implicated in the plot to varying degrees.

Setting up their base of operations in a funeral parlor in Quito two blocks away from the national palace, General González and General Solís launched their coup plot in the dead of night on August 31, 1975, mobilizing a force consisting of 150 soldiers and six to ten outdated US Army tanks. The coup attempt was quickly plagued with problems: General González distributed manifestos announcing the coup prematurely, which coincidentally reached President Rodriguez; General Solís, the highest-ranking officer involved in the coup, was captured early on by Battalion 142 while attempting to court the Quito Artillery Battalion.

By the early morning of September 1, 1975, the coup attempt was in full swing as the rebel tank unit besieged the presidential palace in Quito, aiming to capture President Rodriguez. Unbeknownst to them, however, the president had already slipped away unnoticed after receiving the copy of the general's manifesto, leaving his wife and five kids behind in the palace. He relocated to an army base at Riobamba, over a hundred miles south of Quito, where he gathered loyalist forces to crush the coup.

Rebel forces, mistakenly believing the president was still trapped inside the palace, continued laying siege to the hollow shell. They made further errors by failing to seize key government installations such as the Ministry of Defense, the city's airport, broadcasting facilities, or newspapers. The rebels further weakened their position when they allowed President Rodriguez's wife and children to leave the palace, giving up one of their few potential bargaining chips.

The tides turned in the president's favor when the air force and navy declared their support for the regime. By 4 PM, loyalist troops, particularly the Vencedores Battalion, had surrounded the presidential palace and successfully retaken it, 12 hours after the rebel assault began. The rebel forces eventually surrendered. Amid the chaos of the failed coup however, mobs of Quito citizens ransacked the national palace, taking away items like rugs, lamps, and other valuables. The state of confusion also allowed General González to escape unnoticed while disguised in civilian clothes. He initially attempted to seek political asylum at the U.S. embassy, but his request was denied. Eventually, González Alvear managed to take refuge in the Chilean embassy and was later allowed to go into exile in Chile by the Pinochet regime, where he lived until his death in 2015. Other coup participants were confined in García Moreno Prison, while some managed to escape and seek asylum in the embassies of Colombia, Chile and Venezuela.

== Aftermath ==
In the end, twenty five people were killed and more than 53 were injured over the course of the two-day uprising, including civilian and military casualties. Following the failed coup attempt, President Rodriguez imposed a curfew and ordered the arrest for all members of the Civic Front, who had publicly supported the coup attempt. Among those arrested were Pablo Dávalos Dillon, from the Social Christian party, and five members of the Christian Democrats: Guillermo Cabrera, Carlos Cornejo Orbe, Fausto Cordovez Chiriboga, and José Joaquin Silva.

This event would become known in Ecuadorian history as the Guerra de la Funeraria, due to the fact that General González Alvear used a funeral parlor in Quito as the base of the coup's operations. After the military revolt was crushed, President Rodríguez ordered the press not to mention the September 1 events again. In a satirical manner, Ecuador's mass media referred to the events as "August 32".

Despite the defeat of the 1975 coup attempt, this was the trigger for deterioration in the Ecuadorian military regime. In 1976, General Rodríguez was removed from office under High Command's pressure and replaced by a military triumvirate composed of Alfredo Poveda Burbano, Guillermo Durán Arcentales and Luis Leoro Franco. The Civic Front denounced the "coup", accusing the new rulers of having been personally chosen by Rodríguez Lara.

The 1975 coup attempt revealed a breach in the institutional unity of the Armed Forces of Ecuador. According to El Telégrafo, Ecuador's presidential escort has adopted the motto "Loyalty until sacrifice" since the 1975 events. As a way of alleviating splits within the military institution, the Supreme Council of Government - the ruling junta since the 1976 coup - had the idea of handing power back to civilians, which culminated in the 1978–79 transition to the civilian rule.
