= Madera ambush =

2020 clash between Mexican organized crime cartels

- Part of Mexican drug war
Date	April 3, 2020
Location	near Chuhuichupa, Ciudad Madera, Chihuahua, Mexico
Result	La Linea victory

Belligerents
Gente Nueva del Jaguar y sus Lobos	La Linea

Commanders and leaders
El Jaguar; El Lobo †; El Morito †	El 32

Strength
20	40

Casualties and losses
19 killed 1 injured	Unknown

On April 3, 2020, members of the La Línea faction of the Juárez Cartel led by El 32 ambushed members of Gente Nueva del Jaguar y sus Lobos, a faction of the Sinaloa Cartel led by El Jaguar, near Ciudad Madera, Chihuahua, Mexico. Nineteen people were killed in the ambush, and one was injured.

== Prelude ==
Confrontations between Gente Nueva and La Linea have been ongoing in northern Mexico for years, and in 2017, became controlled by Roberto Gonzalez Montes, known as El 32 in La Linea. Francisco Arvizu Marquez, dubbed El Jaguar, leads a Gente Nueva faction in the area. They most notably culminated in the LeBarón and Langford families massacre in November 2019. The massacre drew serious concern from the Mexican and American governments, and efforts began to crack down on La Linea.

Eighteen others were killed in separate incidents in the Madera area on April 3.

== Clashes ==
The clashes occurred on a dirt road near Chuhuichupa, near La Norteña, around 6:35pm local time. A wounded 18-year-old man named Tomas Estrada Estrada from the Gente Nueva group stated that his group of around twenty people were ambushed by forty members of La Linea. According to Estrada, Gente Nueva was traveling under the command of El Jaguar's brother El Lobo at the time of the ambush. Eighteen people were killed in the immediate aftermath of the attack. Two injured fighters were taken to a hospital in Ciudad Cuauhtémoc, but one died on the way. Mexican police seized 18 guns at the scene.

== Aftermath ==
On April 7, Chihuahua attorney general Cesar Augusto Peniche Espejel said nine of the 19 victims had been identified, although the brother and nephew of El Jaguar had not been identified yet. In an operation against La Linea by the Mexican government, three camps were destroyed. The toll was later updated, and El Jaguar's nephew Uriel Arvizu "El Morito" and El Jaguar's brother Jose Luis Arvizu Marquez "El Lobo" were both killed in the ambush. El Lobo was a senior leader in El Jaguar's faction of Gente Nueva.
