= Operation Limpieza =

1965 operation during the Dominican Civil War

- Part of Dominican Civil War
Date	13 May – 21 May, 1965
Location	northern Santo Domingo, Dominican Republic
Result	Constitutionalist victory: Successfully silencing Radio Santo Domingo

Belligerents
Dominican Republic (Constitutionalist faction)	Dominican Republic (Loyalist faction)

Commanders and leaders
Col. Antonio Imbert Barrera	Unknown

Strength
1,000 Regulars; 16 Tanks	Unknown

Casualties and losses
Heavy losses (Constitutionalist faction)	

Operation Limpieza took place during the Dominican Civil War in May 1965. The objective of the operation was to eliminate rebel resistance in the northern part of Santo Domingo. Operation Limpieza (Cleanup) involved 16 tanks and over 1,000 troops of the military junta.

The offensive began on 13 May. The attacking infantry was well equipped with mortars, bazookas, and 37 mm cannons, while the defending civilians were armed with nothing heavier than machine guns. However, the rebels inflicted heavy losses on the junta troops. Nonetheless, junta troops were successful in eliminating pockets of rebel resistance in the northern part of the capital and in silencing Radio Santo Domingo. Operation Limpieza ended on 21 May.

The operation resulted in the wholesale destruction of many city blocks. Junta troops massacred many black civilians as part of their Limpieza campaign.
