= Tuzantla shootout =

2022 shootout in Mexico

- Part of the Mexican drug war
Date	August 24, 2022
Location	Tuzantla, Michoacán, Mexico
Result	Inconclusive

Belligerents
Tuzantla-based faction of La Familia Michoacana	Rival faction of La Familia Michoacana

Commanders and leaders
Johnny "El Pez" Hortado Olascoaga; José Alfredo "El Fresa" Hurtado Olascoaga	"El Chaparro"

Casualties and losses
Unknown	Unknown
- 8 civilians killed

On August 24, 2022, eight people were killed in the city of Tuzantla, Michoacán, in Mexico, after a firefight between rival factions of La Familia Michoacana.

== Prelude ==
The state of Michoacán, in south-central Mexico, has had a heavy cartel presence since the early 2010s. The cartels in Michoacán often exploit the lucrative avocado trade, the largest export from Michoacán and an integral part of the state's economy. The dominant cartels in the area are La Familia Michoacana and Los Caballeros Templarios, both originating locally after incursions by Los Zetas and the Gulf Cartel. In early 2022, Tuzantla had seen cartel violence with an ambush on Mexican government arms inspectors raiding suspected cartel members' homes.

== Shooting ==
According to Mexican Deputy Security Minister Ricardo Mejía Berdeja, the attack began around 2:00pm local time in the town of Yerbabuena, before spreading to the town square of Tuzantla. The fighting began after a rival faction of La Familia entered the town, shooting at the Tuzantla-based faction. Four pickup trucks were torched, and civilians stated houses on the streets where fighting broke out were raided. The original dispute, according to Mexican prosecutors, stemmed from infighting between brothers Johnny "El Pez" and Jose Alfredo "El Fresa" Hurtado Olascoaga, leaders of the Tuzantla cell, and their former coworker known as "El Chaparro".

== Aftermath ==
The bodies of eight civilians killed during the fighting were discovered in a butterfly sanctuary near Tuzantla. The Mexican National Guard announced the creation of a new post in Melchor Ocampo, near Tuzantla. Michoacán security minister José Alfredo Reyes Ortega also visited Tuzantla after the attack, promising to bolster security.
