= Corynthia expedition =

Part of the Cuban Revolution in 1957

- Part of Cuban Revolution
- Map of Cuba
Date	19–28 May 1957
Location	Uvero, near the coast in southeastern Cuba
Result	Cuban government victory: Failure of the expedition
Territorial changes	None

Belligerents
Republic of Cuba	26th of July Movement; Partido Auténtico (financial support)

Commanders and leaders
(Republic of Cuba (1902–1959)) Fulgencio Batista (Republic of Cuba (1902–1959)) Fermin Cowley	Calixto Sánchez White; Carlos Prío Socarrás (financing)

Units involved
Cuban Constitutional Army; Cuban Police	Unknown

Strength
500 soldiers 200 rural guards	~150-20 militants

Casualties and losses
Unknown	16 killed

The Corynthia expedition, also known as the Corinthia invasion or the Corinthia massacre, was a failed armed attack carried out in Uvero near the coast of Cuba and was financed by former president of Cuba, Carlos Prío Socarrás. Due to the revolutionaries being spotted, they were tipped off to the state police (Guardia Rural) which quickly engaged the invading rebels. 16 rebels were killed, and the expedition was ruled a failure.

== Preparation and arrival ==
Map of Central Biscayne Bay, a part of Biscayne Bay where the militants had departed towards Cuba.

On May 19, 1957, the Corinthia, a small ship under US registration left Florida's Biscayne Bay headed for Cuba on a Prío-financed revolutionary expedition. The expeditionary force, led by Calixto Sánchez White, aimed to open a second front against Batista in the Sierra Cristal. The landing had been planned in the Baracoa area, but the incidents encountered during navigation forced them to deviate from their itinerary. Upon their arrival on Cuban shores after a four-day journey, lengthened by bad weather, the inexperience of the pilot and a faulty engine, the revolutionaries were helped by fishermen from Cayo Saetía, near Mayarí, where they had arrived.

== The expedition and massacre ==
Soon after their landing on May 23 at Cabonico (near Mayarí in north Oriente), a Cabonico man spotted the invading force and tipped off the State Police (Guardia Rural), which were stationed at the barracks in Mayarí, which immediately dispatched men to engage the landing force, and notified other commands including the Army garrison in Holguin commanded by Col. Fermin Cowley. Batista's intelligence services were well-informed about the plan, and had been well-prepared for the landing by rebel forces. Both Government and rebel forces suffered casualties, the Government headquarters said, but no number was given for the government casualties.

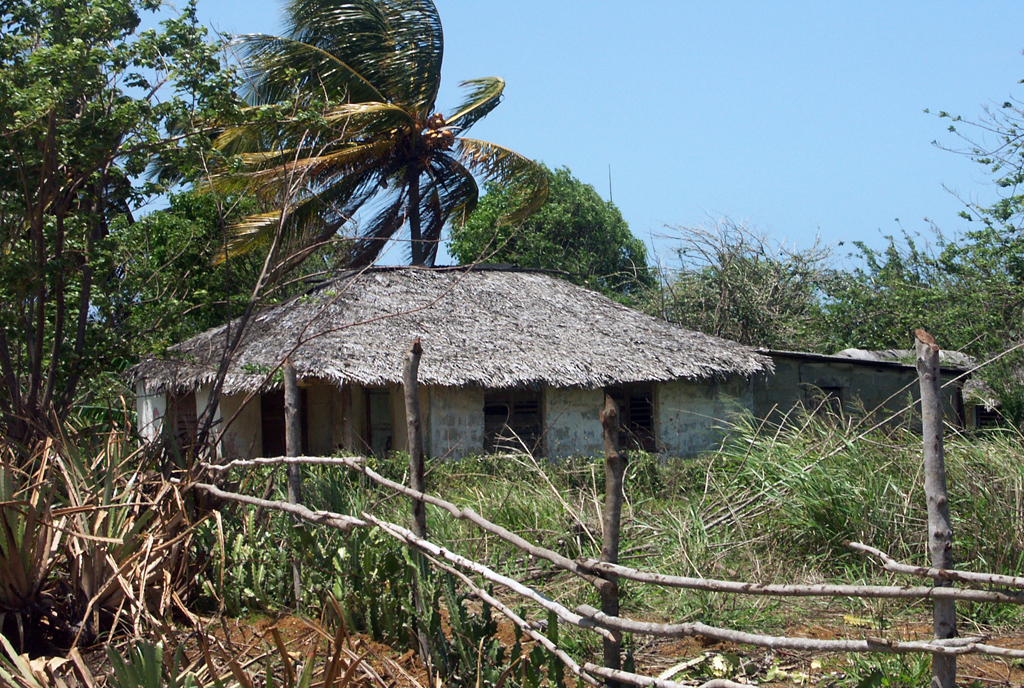
Camino de Playa Corinthia in 2008

The military gunned down 16 rebels. During the massacre, 16 of the 27 members of the group died. They belonged to the Authentic Party and had claimed allegiance to M-26-7 and had left Miami for Cuba on the night of May 19, led by Calixto Sánchez White. Fermin Cowley, who was under the direct orders of Fulgencio Batista on that mission, had the unequivocal instruction not to count surrendered people, only dead people. He made every effort to comply with the battalion of 500 soldiers and 200 rural guards, very well armed to pursue, surround and annihilate the detachment of future combatants, whose number and names were well known to them. They were well informed about the landing, and used this to their advantage.
