= Prison riot =

Organized act of defiance by prisoners against each other or the prison administration

A prison riot is an act of concerted defiance or disorder by a group of prisoners against the prison administrators, prison officers, or other groups of prisoners.

Academic studies of prison riots emphasize a connection between prison conditions (such as prison overcrowding) and riots, or discuss the dynamics of the modern prison riot. In addition, a large proportion of academic studies concentrate on specific cases of prison riots. Other recent research analyzes and examines prison strikes and reports of contention with inmate workers.

== Prison conditions ==
In the late 20th century, the analyses and conclusions presented to account for prison disturbances and riots began to shift and change based upon new studies and research. Initially, prison riots were considered irrational actions on the behalf of the prisoners. Nevertheless, there has been a shift in the form of explanation as external conditions like overcrowding are promoted by authorities as possible sources of causation.

== List of notable prison riots ==
The list does not include prisoner-of-war camps.

Event	Date	Location	Death toll	Notes	Ref.
Cooking Pot Uprising	1846, July 1	Penal colony of Norfolk Island, Australia	4 officials killed		
	1929, October 3	Colorado State Penitentiary, Cañon City, Colorado, United States	13 (5 inmates, 8 guards)	A majority of the physical plant was destroyed during the riot.	
Battle of Alcatraz	1946, May 2–4	Alcatraz Federal Penitentiary, Alcatraz Island, United States	5		
Kingston Penitentiary riot	1954, August 14	Kingston Penitentiary, Kingston, Ontario, Canada	0	Two-hour riot involving 900 inmates. Breakout attempt was foiled. Several buildings set on fire. $2 million in damages. 160 troops and a squad of police responded.	
	1954, September 22	Missouri State Penitentiary, Jefferson City, Missouri, United States	4 inmates	29 injured, including 4 guards	
Montana State Prison Riot	1959, April 16–18	Montana State Prison, Montana, United States	3		
	1958, July 31	Shita Prison, Harod Valley, Israel	13 (2 jailors and 11 inmates)	The most deadly prison riot in the history of Israel. The prisoners, most of them were Palestinian Fedayeen, assaulted the prison's duty officer, took control of the armory, and fought against the police reinforcements who arrived to the scene in order to suppress the rebellion.	
Pulau Senang prison riot	1963, July 12	Pulau Senang, Singapore	4 prison officers		
Kingston Penitentiary riot	1971, April 14	Kingston Penitentiary, Kingston, Ontario, Canada	2 inmates		
	1971, August 10	Idaho State Penitentiary, Boise, Idaho, United States	1 inmate	2 buildings destroyed, in March 1973 another riot that left multiple buildings destroyed.	
San Quentin 1971 riot	1971, August 21	San Quentin State Prison, San Quentin, California, United States	6	Riot between Black Guerrilla Family and Mexican Mafia	
Attica Prison riot	1971, September 9–13	Attica Correctional Facility, Attica, New York, United States	43		
	1973, July 27	Oklahoma State Penitentiary, McAlester, Oklahoma, United States	3 inmates	21 injured, 24 buildings were damaged and only 4 buildings were left usable. Over $25 million in damages	
August Rebellion	1974, August	Bedford Hills Correctional Facility, Bedford Hills, New York, United States	0	Prisoners held 7 guards hostage and controlled parts of the prison for 2.5 hours. Twenty-five women were injured and twenty-four women were transferred to the Matteawan Complex for the Criminally Insane.	
New Mexico State Penitentiary riot	1980, February 2–3	Penitentiary of New Mexico, Santa Fe County, New Mexico, United States	33	Over 200 injured	
Welikada prison massacre	1983, July 25+27	Welikada Prison, Sri Lanka	56 (53 inmates and 3 officers)		
Fremantle Prison riot	1988, January 14	Fremantle Prison, Fremantle, Australia	0	Prisoners created a fire and 5 officers were taken hostage. The fire caused $1.8 million in damage and unintentionally prevented the planned escape	
	1988, July 20	Centro Penitenciario, Michoacán, Mexico	10 inmates	13 injured	
Atlanta prison riots	1987, November	United States Penitentiary, Atlanta and Federal Detention Center, Oakdale, United States	1	250 injured	
1989 Davao hostage crisis	1989, August 13–15	Davao Metrodiscom, Davao City, Philippines	21 (5 hostages and 16 prisoners)		
Leopoldov prison uprising	1990, March	Leopoldov Prison, Leopoldov, Slovakia	1 inmate	40 injured (11 prison officers, 29 inmates)	
1990 Strangeways Prison riot	1990, April 1–25	Strangeways Prison, Manchester, England	1 inmate	194 injured (147 prison officers, 47 inmates), 25-day prison riot	
Carandiru massacre	1992, October 2	Carandiru Penitentiary, São Paulo, Brazil	111		
	1990, June	Robinson Correctional Institution, Enfield, Connecticut, United States	0	300 to 400 inmates set fire to the mess hall and gymnasium	
	1993, Easter Sunday	Southern Ohio Correctional Facility, Scioto County, Ohio, United States	10 (9 inmates, 1 officer)		
	1994, July 12	Robinson Correctional Institution, Enfield, Connecticut, United States	2 inmates	37 injured (35 inmates, 2 correctional officers)	
Prison Six rebellion	1997, August 9	Prison Six, near Atlit, Israel	0	The most famous case of a military prison riot in Israel, started by three imprisoned soldiers who demanded more humane treatment from the staff. The rebellion changed the military police's approach to its prison service sector and led to improvements in the physical structure of military prisons, as well as in conditions for both jail instructors and prisoners.	
Kalutara prison riots	1997, December 12	Kalutara, Sri Lanka	3		
Bindunuwewa massacre	2000, October 24	Bindunuwewa, Sri Lanka	26		
	2001, May	Centro de Cumplimiento Peniteciario, Iquique, Chile	28+	150 injured	
	2002, January 2	Urso Branco prison, in Porto Velho, Brazil	40		
	2003, April 5	El Porvenir prison, La Ceiba, Honduras	69		
	2004, May 16	El Porvenir prison, La Ceiba, Honduras	86 inmates		
	2004, May 29–31	Benfica prison, Rio de Janeiro, Brazil	38		
	2004, August 19	La Esperanza prison, San Salvador, El Salvador	31	24 injured	
	2004, December 17	Pul-e-Charkhi prison, Kabul, Afghanistan	8 (4 inmates, 4 guards)		
	2005, January	Camp Bucca, Umm Qasr, Iraq	4 inmates	6 injured	
	2005, March 15	Camp Bagong Diwa, Taguig, Philippines	23 (22 inmates, 1 officer)	Almost all Abu Sayyaf members who rose up, including several leaders, were killed	
	2005, August	Pavón Prison / Granja Pino Canada / El Hoyon, Guatemala	35		
	2006, February	North County Correctional Facility, Castaic, California, United States	1 inmate	100+ injured	
	2006, February 26	Pul-e-Charkhi prison, Kabul, Afghanistan	7+		
	2007, January 7	Apanteos jail, near Santa Ana, El Salvador	21		
	2007, December	Santa Ana prison, San Cristobal, Tachira, Venezuela	30 inmates		
	2008, March 28	Federal Correctional Institution, Three Rivers, Live Oak County, Texas, United States	1 inmate	22 injured	
	2008, April 20	United States Penitentiary, Florence High, Florence, Colorado, United States	2 inmates	A large scale race riot erupted between white supremacist inmates and black inmates, resulting in 2 deaths and 5 serious injuries.	
	2008, October 20	Cedes prison, Reynosa, Mexico	21+	8 injured	
2009 Ciudad Juárez prison riot	2009, March 4	CERESO state prison, Ciudad Juárez, Mexico	20	15 injured	
	2010, May 5	Santa Ana prison, San Cristobal, Tachira, Venezuela	8	3 injured	
	2011, October 15	Matamoros prison, Matamoros, Mexico	20	12 injured	
Altamira prison brawl	2012, January 4	Cereso de Altamira, Altamira, Mexico	31	13 injured	
Apodaca prison riot	2012, February 19	Apodaca, Mexico	44	12 injured	
	2012, May 20	Adams County Correctional Facility, Natchez, Mississippi, United States	1 guard	7 injured	
Yare prison riot	2012, August 20	Yare Prison near Caracas, Venezuela	25	43 injured	
2012 Welikada prison riot	2012, November 9–10	Welikada Prison, Sri Lanka	27	40 injured	
2013 Uribana prison riot	2013, January 25	Uribana prison, Barquisimeto, Venezuela	61	120 injured	
2013 Palmasola prison riot	2013, August 23	Palmasola, Santa Cruz de la Sierra, Bolivia	31	37 injured	
	2015, January 4	Brandvlei Maximum Correctional Centre, Western Cape, South Africa	1 inmate death, at least 6 injured	Prison gangs attacked a warder, followed by retaliation from authorities.	
Kaohsiung Prison riot	2015, February 11–12	Kaohsiung, Taiwan	6 (suicide)		
Topo Chico prison riot	2016, February 10–11	Topo Chico prison, Monterrey, Mexico	52+	12 injured	
	2016, July 19	Pavón Prison, Fraijanes, Guatemala	13		
2016 New Bilibid Prison riot	2016, September 28	New Bilibid Prison, Muntinlupa, Philippines	1	4 injured	
Agricultural Penitentiary of Monte Cristo riot	2016, October 16	Agricultural Penitentiary of Monte Cristo, Boa Vista, Roraima, Brazil	25 inmates		
	2017, January 1	Anísio Jobim Penitentiary Complex, Amazonas, Brazil	60+		
	2017, January 2	Prison Unit of Puraquequara, Manaus, Brazil	10		
	2017, January 6	Agricultural Penitentiary of Monte Cristo, Boa Vista, Roraima, Brazil	37		
	2017, January 8	Desembargador Raimundo Vidal Pessoa jail, Manaus, Brazil	4		
	2017, January 15	Natal State Prison, Natal, Brazil	27	9 injured	
	2017, February 1	James T. Vaughn Correctional Center, New Castle County, Delaware, United States	1 officer		
	2017, May 15	Buimo prison, Lae, Papua New Guinea	17		
	2017, June 7	Camp Bagong Diwa, Taguig, Philippines	2	17 injured	
	2017, July 6	Las Cruces prison, Acapulco, Mexico	28		
	2017, August 11	Cedes prison, Reynosa, Mexico	9	11 injured	
	2017, October 11	Cadereyta prison, Nuevo León, Mexico	13		
Lee Correctional Prison Riot	2018, April 15	Lee Correctional Institution, Bishopville, South Carolina, United States	7		
	2019, May 20	Vahdat prison, Vahdat, Tajikistan	32		
Acarigua prison riot	2019, May 24	Police station cellblocks in Acarigua, Venezuela	29	19 injured	
July 2019 Cameroon prison riots	2019, July 22–24	Kondengui Central Prison and Buea prison, Cameroon	Unknown	Unknown	
2019 Altamira prison riot	2019, July 29	Centro de Recuperação Regional de Altamira prison, Altamira, Brazil	62		
	2019, December 23	El Porvenir prison, La Ceiba, Honduras	18		
Cieneguillas prison riots	2019, December 31	Cieneguillas Regional Center for Social Reintegration, Cieneguillas, Mexico	16 inmates	5 injured	
Cieneguillas prison riots	2020, January 2	Cieneguillas Regional Center for Social Reintegration, Cieneguillas, Mexico	1 inmate	5 injured	
	2020, March 8–9	Sant'Anna prison, Modena, Italy	8 inmates	According to Modena's magistrature, all 8 deaths were caused by methadone and benzodiazepine overdose. The substances were looted from Sant'Anna's pharmacy. Modena's Procura requested the dismissal of all deaths on 3 March 2021.	
Bogotá prison riot	2020, March, 22	La Modelo prison, Bogotá, Colombia	23	90 injured	
	2020, March 30	Sepidar Prison, Ahvaz, Iran	18		
	2020, March 31	Sheiban Prison, Ahvaz, Iran	Unknown		
Guanare prison riot	2020, May 1	Los Llanos prison, Guanare, Venezuela	47	75 injured	
February 2021 Ecuadorian prison riots	2021, February 24	Regional & Penitenciaría del Litoral, Guayaquil; Cárcel de Turi, Cuenca; Centro de Rehabilitación Social Sierra Norte Cotopaxi, Latacunga, Ecuador	79	Coordinated riot as a result of a drug turf war. Eighteen beheadings and at least one prisoner had his heart cut out.	
September 2021 Guayaquil prison riot	2021, September 29	Penitenciaría del Litoral, Guayaquil, Ecuador	123	Coordinated riot as a result of a drug turf war.	
November 2021 Guayaquil prison riot	2021, November 13	Penitenciaría del Litoral, Guayaquil, Ecuador	68	25 Injured	
	2022, January 25	Social Rehabilitation Center (Cereso) Colima, Mexico	9		
Battle of al-Hasakah (2022)	2022, January 20–30	Al-Sina'a prison, Al-Hasakah, Syria	507	Large-scale Islamic State attack and prison riot aimed at freeing arrested fighters of the Islamic State.	
Tuluá prison riot	2022, June 28	Tuluá prison, Tuluá, Valle del Cauca, Colombia	52		
	2023, January 1	CERESO state prison, Ciudad Juárez, Mexico	14 (4 inmates, 10 guards)		
	2023, February 9	Hatay Closed Prison, Hatay Province, Turkey	3	Three inmates were killed and 12 more injured after soldiers opened fire during a riot. The prisoners were demanding to see their families affected by the 2023 Turkey–Syria earthquake.	
Támara prison riot	2023, June 20	Women's Center for Social Adaptation, Támara, Honduras	46+	A conflict presumed to be between MS-13 and Barrio 18 killed 46 people, after a riot caused a major fire.	
	2023, August 7	Kutama Sinthumule Correctional Centre, Limpopo, South Africa	At least 1 died in fire, 2 hospitalized	The fire was allegedly started by rioting prisoners after grievances about conditions and ill-treatment fell on deaf ears. (Prison managed by South African Custodial Management, a public-private partnership.)	
2026 Negombo prison riot	2026, July 6	Negombo prison, Negombo, Sri Lanka	27	100+ injured. Riots between inmates from rival drug gangs.	

== Gulag uprisings ==
- Norilsk uprising, May 1953 – strike
- Vorkuta uprising, July 1953 – 66 killed
- Kengir uprising, May 1954 – 37 killed (official Soviet figure), 500–700 killed (prisoner provided figure)

== See also ==
- Prison escape
- Walpole prison strike
