= Tangerang prison fire =

2021 fire near Jakarta, Indonesia

Coordinates: 06°11′12″S 106°38′25″E

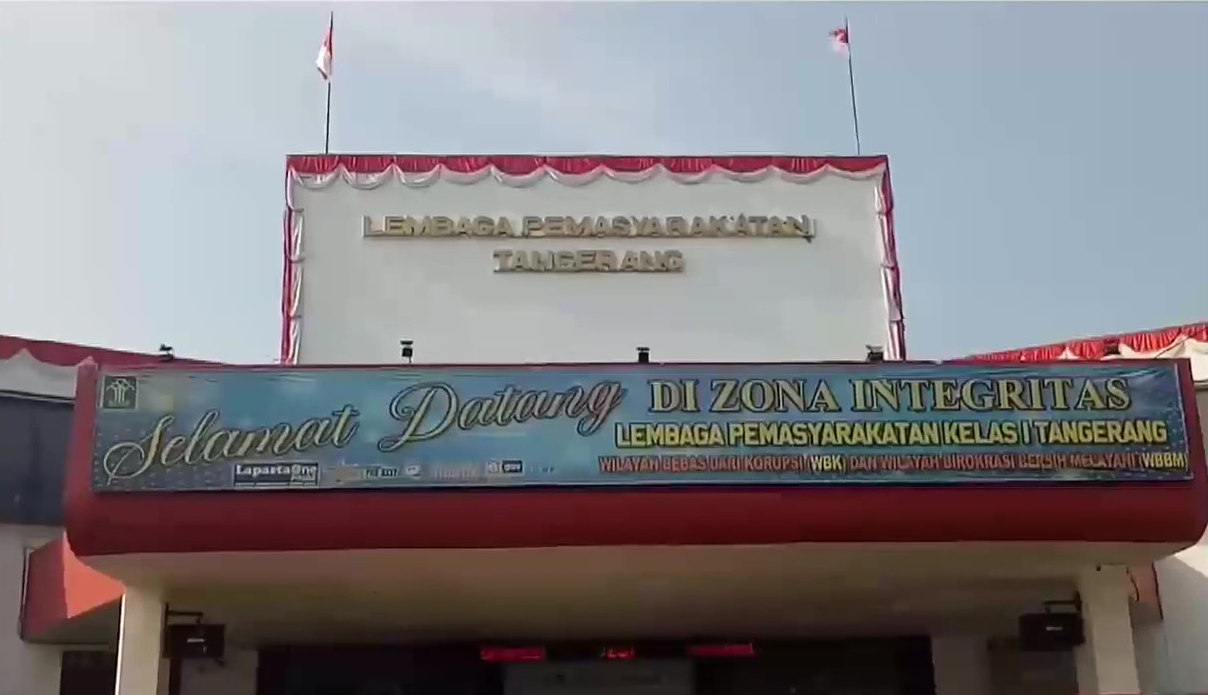
- Above the prison entrance
- Date: 8 September 2021
- Time: 01:45 WIB (18:45 UTC, 7 September)
- Location: Class I Tangerang Prison, Sector C Tangerang, Banten, Indonesia
- Type: Fire
- Deaths: 49
- Injuries: 72

On 8 September 2021, a fire occurred in an overcrowded prison block in the city of Tangerang, Banten, Indonesia. The fire began at about 01:45 WIB (18:45 UTC, 7 September) in sector C of the Tangerang prison, killing 41 inmates and injuring a further 75. More victims succumbed to their injuries in the following days, raising the death toll to 49.

== Background ==
=== Prison system ===
The Indonesian prison system has been overcrowded for years, partially due to stringent laws governing narcotics and a focus on incarceration rather than rehabilitation for those that violate them. Sector C (Chandiri Nengga), the affected prison block, held inmates incarcerated for drug-related offenses. The Class I prison in Tangerang had a capacity of 600, but was holding more than 2,000 inmates. Sector C had been built to hold 38 inmates, but had held 122 at the time of the fire.

=== Tangerang prison ===
The Tangerang prison, officially known as the Tangerang Class I Correctional Facility (Indonesian: Lembaga Pemasyarakatan Klas I Tangerang), was constructed in 1972 as a substitute for the Glodok prison, which at that time had been sold to a private company. The prison was inaugurated on 6 December 1982, by the Director General of Prisons. Although the prison was initially intended to incarcerate white-collar criminals, a surge of drug-related crime in 2008 prompted the government to transfer drug-related criminals into the prison. As of 2016, 60% of inmates in the prison were imprisoned due to drug-related cases.

== Fire ==
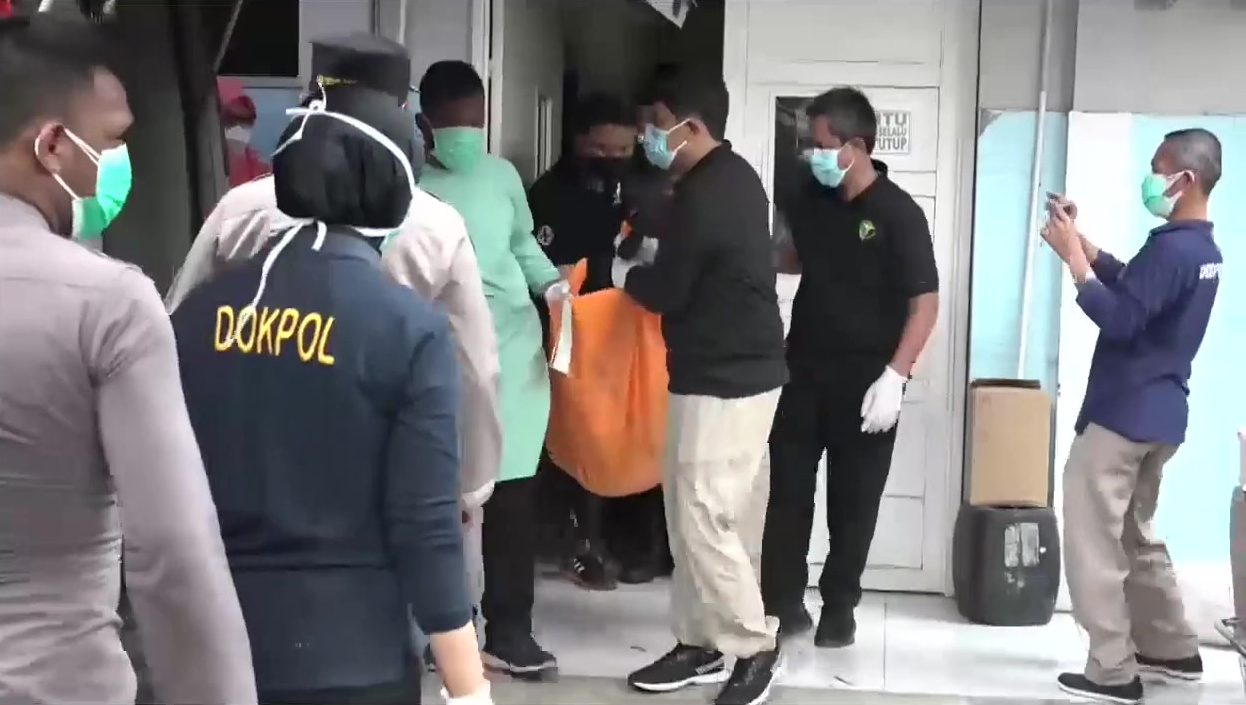
Police members transferring the bodies of the victims into an ambulance.

The fire started at 01:45 local time, when a small fire occurred in sector C2 of the prison. A prison employee, Iyan Sofyan, heard screams from inside the sector's cells. Several other wardens and guards tried to evacuate the entire sector, but were only able to evacuate 20 inmates. The sector housed inmates being held for drug-related offences and had a capacity for 38 but at least three times that were housed there with a spokeswoman for the ministry's corrections department reporting that 122 individuals were housed in a space for 38.

According to the prison's protocols, the inmates were kept in locked cells, but as the fire spread the prison employees did not manage to unlock every room. All the deaths occurred in the locked cells. Firefighters were alerted of the disaster shortly after, and around 30 fire trucks were deployed. The fire trucks arrived on the scene at 02:00, had the fire under control by around 03:00, and finally extinguished the flames roughly two hours after they began.

Multiple Indonesian officials immediately arrived at the scene. Police chief of Jakarta Inspector-General M. Fadil Imran arrived in the morning and deployed around 150 police, mostly Brimob members, to secure the prison perimeters. Minister of Law and Human Rights Yasonna Laoly and deputy minister Edward Omar Sharif Hiariej followed shortly at around 10 AM local time.

== Casualties ==
Some of the inmates that were killed during the fire

In the immediate aftermath of the fire, 41 inmates were killed, eight others seriously injured, and 73 lightly injured. The injured victims were brought to the Sitanala Hospital and the Tangerang Regency General Hospital. A day after the fire, three critically injured victims died in hospital, bringing the death toll to 44. The death toll rose to 46 six days after the fire. The death toll later rose to 49.

Most of the dead inmates were imprisoned for drug-related crimes, while a number of others were imprisoned for terrorism and murder. Two of the dead inmates were foreigners: one from South Africa and the other from Portugal. All of the injured inmates were convicted for drug-related charges.

== Investigation ==
Initial investigations by the police indicated that the fire occurred due to a short circuit. The electrical wiring of the prison had not been upgraded since the prison was built in 1972, and there was also a shortage of fire extinguishers.

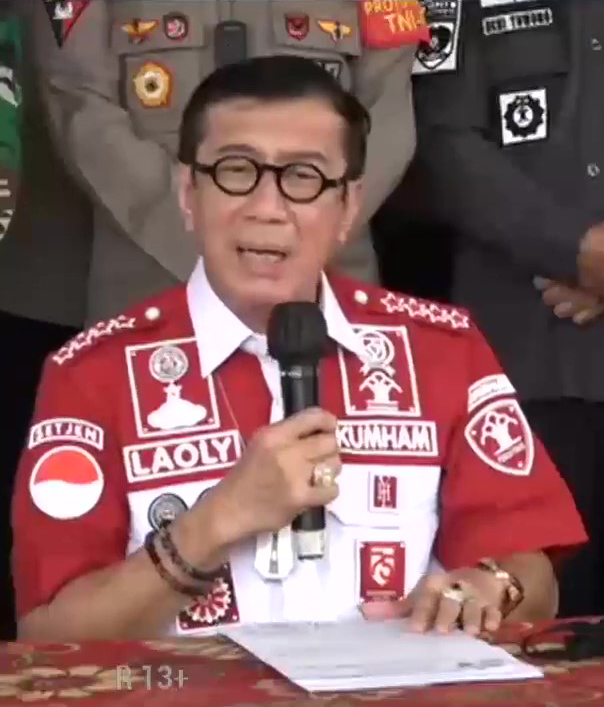
Minister of Law and Human Rights Yasonna Laoly holding a press conference around an hour after his arrival.

== Aftermath ==
Member of the People's Representative Council Syarifuddin Sudding demanded responsibility from Laoly in regards to the incident. In response to the demands, Laoly formed five teams to assist in handling the incident, with each team being responsible for victim identification, victims' funerals, victims' family recovery, coordination of handling, or public relations.

The President of Indonesia Joko Widodo, via his spokesperson Fadjroel Rachman, delivered his condolences to the victims and stated his expectation that the disaster could be handled with few casualties.

Following the accident, Laoly announced that the relatives of the victims would be compensated. Each next-of-kin of the deceased would receive Rp 30 million (US$ 2,120).

Mayor of Tangerang Arief Rachadiono Wismansyah announced that the city would provide financial compensation for the relatives of the victims.

== See also ==
- 1930 Ohio Penitentiary fire
- 1994 Sabaneta Prison fire
- 2005 Higüey Prison fire
- 2010 Santiago prison fire
- 2012 Comayagua prison fire
- 2018 Valencia (Venezuela) prison fire
- List of building or structure fires
