= 2018 Valencia, Venezuela fire =

Prison fire in Valencia, Venezuela

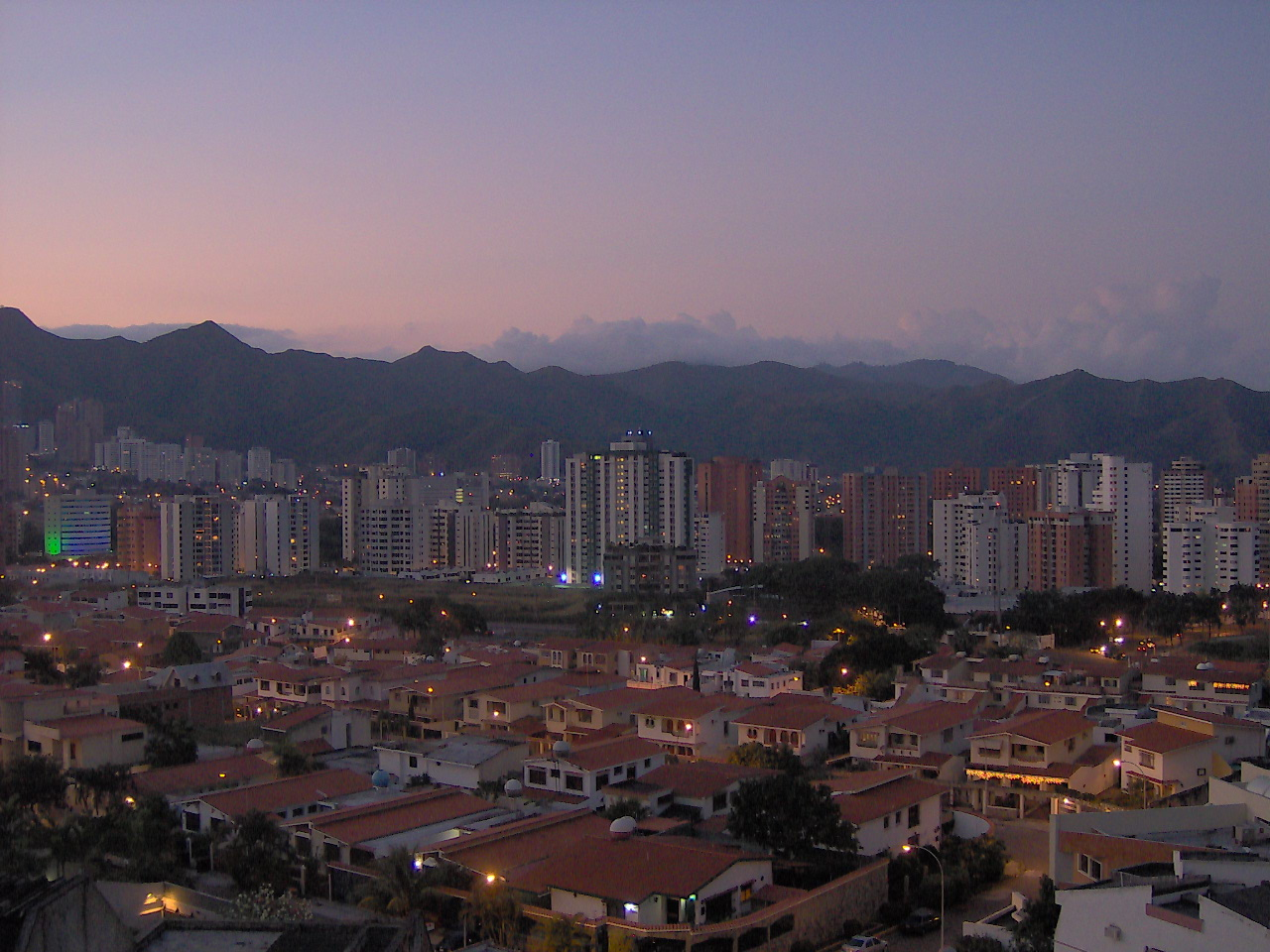
- Valencia, Venezuela, the location of the deadly jail fire
- Date: March 28, 2018
- Venue: Jail cells inside a police station
- Location: Valencia, Carabobo, Venezuela; 10.189222°N 68.002216°W
- Type: Fire
- Motive: Escape attempt
- Deaths: 78+

On 28 March 2018, a fire broke out during a prison riot in the cells at the Carabobo state police headquarters in Valencia, Carabobo, Venezuela. The fire killed at least 68 people and injured scores of others. The fire is one of the deadliest incidents ever in a Venezuelan prison since the 1994 Sabaneta prison fire, in which more than 100 inmates died.

Four prosecutors have been named to investigate the circumstances preceding the victims' deaths. The U.N. High Commissioner for Human Rights requested an investigation and reparations for the families of the fire victims.

== Background ==
Violence and overcrowding are problems in Venezuela's prison system. The Observatorio Venezolano de Prisiones (English: Venezuelan Observatory of Prisons) estimates that 6,663 prisoners have died between 1999 and 2015, with average overcrowding at over 200%.

More than 60 prisoners died in the 2013 Uribana prison riot. The organization Human Rights Watch states that because of poor training and insufficient numbers of guards, corruption and deterioration of infrastructure, armed gangs have seized control of inmate populations.

== Fire ==
The fire began in the jail attached to the police station in Valencia, a city located about 160 km (100 mi) west of Venezuela's capital city, Caracas. The jail was built to contain only 60 prisoners, but when the fire broke out, it housed about 200.

The fire reportedly began when, during a riot, prisoners in the jail inside the police station lit their mattresses on fire in an attempt to escape. Later reports stated that the fire began during a party thrown by the inmates. Gunfire was also reportedly heard during the riot that preceded the fire. However, the circumstances surrounding the fire have yet to be officially confirmed, and local officials initially only confirmed that some people had died in the fire.

Later on the day of the fire, Tarek William Saab, Venezuela's lead prosecutor, stated that the death toll was 68, which included two women, most likely visitors; and Saab stated that an investigation would be started to “clarify” the incident.

== Aftermath ==
On the same day of the fire, relatives of the dead prisoners gathered at the police station where the fire occurred, but were dispersed by police using tear gas. The gas was used after the protesters attempted to push their way into the station and detention center in question, the Carabobo state police headquarters, with one officer being injured by a stone.

The governor of Carabobo, Rafael Lacava, stated his "consternation" over the events, and the human rights body of the United Nations called for an investigation. In a released statement, the U.N. High Commissioner for Human Rights also requested reparations for the victims' families.

Political opponents of Venezuelan President Nicolás Maduro have seized on the fire as evidence that Venezuelan society has declined under Maduro's leadership. Venezuelan opposition leader Henrique Capriles tweeted "How many more times are we going to see the same Dantesque scenes with the prisoners of the country?"

Many of the dead prisoners were buried side by side, and three deep, in a mass grave separated by cinder blocks and marked by crosses.

== See also ==
- Acarigua prison riot
- Guanare prison riot
- 2020 Cagua fire
- 1994 Sabaneta fire
