= Acarigua prison riot =

2019 prison riot in Acarigua, Venezuela

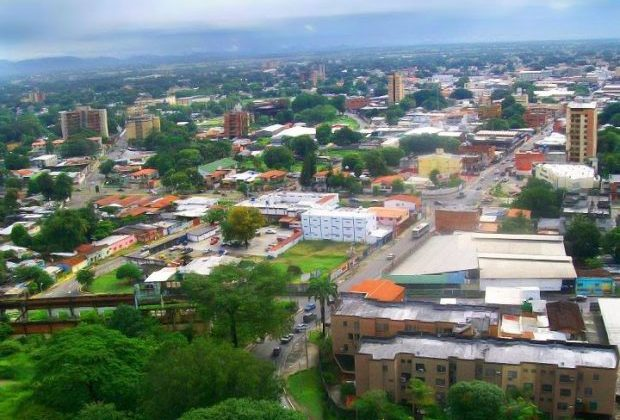
- Acarigua in 2018
- Date: May 24, 2019
- Venue: Cellblocks inside a police station
- Location: Acarigua, Portuguesa, Venezuela; 9°33′57.8″N 69°12′13.5″W
- Type: Riot
- Deaths: 29 inmates
- Injuries: 19 guards

A group of inmates were involved in a prison riot on 24 May 2019 in the police station cellblocks in Acarigua, Portuguesa state, Venezuela. The riot allegedly began when inmate Wilfredo Ramos was killed following ten days of protests against the denial of visits by relatives.

== Background ==
Prisons in Venezuela are largely overpopulated; many prisons are supposedly under gang control and subject to violence. However, the prison of this uprising was actually the holding cells of the police headquarters at Centro de Coordinación Policial José Antonio Páez (PoliPáez). A police document accessed by Agence France-Presse (AFP) reported that the prison cells were designed to hold 60 prisoners, but actually held about 500. Nobody is meant to be held in the cells for more than 48 hours, but many have been there much longer.

Humberto Prado of the NGO Observatorio Venezolano de Prisiones (English: Venezuelan Prison Observatory; OVP) told Reuters that for "several days" before the uprising, inmates at PoliPáez had been asking the ombudsman to assure them they wouldn't be transferred to out-of-state prisons where relatives could not visit them; the uprising took place during a relative visit. This move had apparently been planned by the prison to prevent gang wars between inmates. Mariángel Moro, a journalist from Portuguesa, reported that the tensions began on Mother's Day, when family was not allowed to visit.

Prior to the uprising, videos were recorded by a masked inmate. In them, he asks for a cease in violence and for guards to "stop shooting" before waving weapons and saying he is "willing to die" fighting the guards. The videos were shared on social media after the event by an exiled Venezuelan prosecutor, Zair Mundaray. Panorama reported that Caraota Digital named the man in the video as Wilfredo Ramos. Prior to the uprising, Ramos had tried bargaining with the prison services for better conditions at PoliPáez. It is believed Ramos died in the ensuing fight.

A police report from 16 May revealed that the prison services and local government were aware of protests and tension breaking out at PoliPáez.

== Riots ==
According to the BBC, Venezuelan news outlet El Pitazo reported that the incident began on 14 May. The violence escalated on 23 May, with prisoners taking hostages from the visitors to the center and several troops entering the prison. A Portuguesa state official called it an escape attempt, saying inmates tried to escape through a hole in the wall but began fighting. Efecto Cocuyo reports that Wilfredo Ramos Ferrer was known as the leader of the inmates ("pran"), and that the violence began when he was shot by prison officials during the ongoing prison protests at PoliPáez.

Panorama reported that the prisoners began revolting at 5:50 am. Efecto Cocuyo says that the violence started on 23 May and ended at 10:00 am on 24 May, with prisoners surrendering. The outburst of violence was supposedly in response to guards trying to remove the visitors and carry out searches. It is believed that the group of prisoners was armed.

According to Panorama, the first local news was in the early hours of the morning when residents of Acarigua and Araure heard that a prisoner was dead, followed by "six continuous hours of explosions" throughout the morning; Venezuelan journalist Mariángel Moro, based in the area, called it a "morning of terror". Moro confirmed that there had been riots in PoliPáez for over a week, adding that it may stem from the guards often turning away family members trying to visit, a legal right, along with denying the inmates other requests, like construction materials to build a swimming pool.

Local police, as well as soldiers of the National Guard and a specialised prison unit, were quick to attend the scene, helping prison guards quash the uprising. As well as shooting, it was reported that an explosion was heard; it was later announced by authorities that three explosive devices were used, reported as two by the NGO Una Ventana a la Libertad (English: A Window to Freedom), with several prison guards wounded by them.

== Casualties ==
At least 29 prisoners were killed by gun fire. It is reported that several bodies had gunshot wounds through the head, and that Wilfredo Ramos Ferrer's body was completely destroyed, with his face also largely disfigured; he was identified by a shoulder tattoo. Ramos' body was supposedly recovered with a grenade in his right hand, and it is believed he was killed by guards as he prepared to throw the grenade.

Nineteen guards were injured.

== Response ==
The information was spread to English-language news agencies through the OVP, who called it a "massacre". Prado also blamed Prisons Minister Iris Varela for the deaths of the prisoners.

According to Reuters, the official story from Óscar Valero of the local government, describing an escape attempt where rival prison gangs killed each other then harmed the guards trying to intervene, has been questioned by human rights groups. The official source also reports a lower number of inmates than the NGOs, at 355. The Ministry for Prisons in Venezuela did not comment on the uprising, saying that police station cells are not in their jurisdiction.

Officers at PoliPáez took many inmates into custody for inciting the uprising, with photographs shared on the internet and in coverage by major newspapers like La Patilla showing these prisoners stripped naked and lying in rows on the ground outside. A police report of the inmates at this time counted 540, not including those killed. The police also prevented journalists from covering the incident at the scene.

The Venezuelan Prosecutor's Office has confirmed it is investigating the events. In order to perform autopsies, gowns and scalpels were delivered from Caracas, 200 miles away. El Pitazo reported that some autopsies were performed with equipment purchased by relatives of the deceased, before the supplies could arrive from the capital, and that a team of forensic pathologists also came with the supplies from Caracas in order to complete the remaining autopsies.

The Venezuelan National Assembly, with an opposition majority, expressed its sympathy and blamed the policies of the leading government.

The Inter-American Commission of Human Rights (IACHR) condemned the violence in the police station, calling upon the State to "adopt immediate measures to guarantee the life and integrity of detainees", stressing the importance of investigating the events.

Amnesty International director Erika Guevara-Rosas blamed the government of Nicolás Maduro as the responsible for the deaths because the inmates were under state custody.

== See also ==
- 2018 Valencia, Venezuela fire
- Guanare prison riot
- Overcrowding
