= Cieneguillas =

Cieneguillas may refer to:

- Cieneguillas, Argentina
- Cieneguillas, Bolivia
- Cieneguillas, Mexico

== See also ==
- Cieneguilla
