= Topo Chico prison riot =

2016 prison riot in Mexico

2016 Topo Chico prison riot
- Part of the Mexican drug war
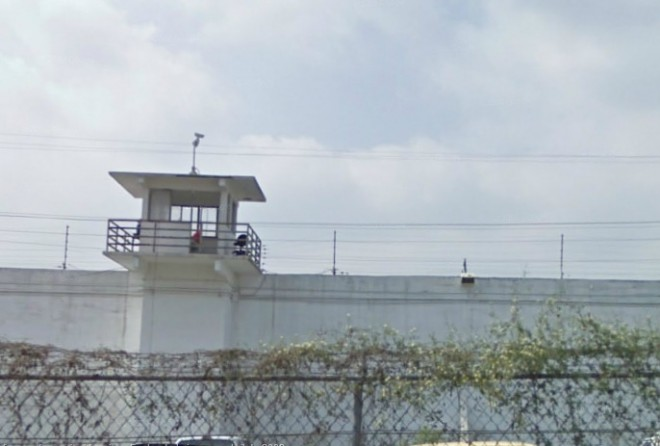
- Date: February 10–11, 2016; 11:30 p.m.–1:30 a.m.
- Location: Topo Chico (prison), Nuevo León State, Northern Mexico
- Caused by: Gang rivalry, overcrowded prison, gang rule
- Methods: Melee; stabbing, beating, shooting

Parties
Los Zetas prisoners ("El Z-27" faction)	Los Zetas prisoners ("El Credo" faction)	Prison Guards; Federal Police; Local law enforcement Mexican Army

Lead figures
Juan Pedro Saldivar-Farías ("El Z-27")	Jorge Iván Hernández Cantú ("El Credo")	Jaime Rodríguez Calderón

Number
?	?	100 guards

Casualties
- Deaths: 52+
- Injuries: 12
- Arrested: 3
- All fatalities were inmates

On 10 February 2016, a prison riot broke out at the Topo Chico prison near Monterrey, in northern Mexico. 49 inmates were killed during the riot and ensuing fire. The riot was the most deadly in Mexican penal history, surpassing the death toll of the 2012 Apodaca prison riot. After the rioting, authorities uncovered 'luxury cells' prison leaders had. Among the items confiscated included televisions, mini-fridges, aquariums, and saunas.

== Background ==
The Topo Chico prison houses 3,800 inmates, over 35% of capacity overseen by 100 guards. According to Mexican media, the prison was controversially known for being overcrowded and ungovernable.

== Prison riot ==
The riot started at 11:30 p.m, the cause was an internal dispute between members of the Los Zetas drug cartel. A rival faction of the gang was led by Juan Pedro Saldivar-Farías (known as "El Z-27"), against a faction led by Jorge Iván Hernández Cantú (alias "El Credo"). Hernández was at first reported by Mexican media to have ties to the Gulf Cartel, a fierce rival to the Zetas, but it was later confirmed that the fight broke out between members of the same criminal organization. The fighting was allegedly triggered by a warring dispute between Saldivar over control of the prison from Hernández.

The rioting began when Saldivar mobilized a group of prisoners to attack rival leader Hernández, but they failed to reach his cell. The rioting took place in two separate units of the prison complex, and inmates used a combination of weapons such as wooden bats, sticks, razor blades, bottles, and chairs during the melee. Fire was set to a food storage and the blaze spread to a section housing prison cells.

The fighting continued until 1:30 a.m., when the Mexican Army along with federal and local police subdued the rioting.

According to Nuevo Leon state Governor Jaime Rodríguez Calderón, the riot was not an attempt at escape but a fight between the two rival groups. No prisoners had escaped during the riot.

== Fatalities ==
Forty of the victims have been identified, while five were unrecognizable, charred by the fire. All of the fatalities were inmates and 40 of them were killed from strikes and blows delivered by hammers, cudgels, and knives. In all, 60 hammers, 86 knives and 120 shivs were used.

The sole fatality of a gunshot wound was an inmate who was killed by a guard protecting a group of women. The guard, Jose Reyes Hernandez, was later charged with murder.

== Arrests ==
A state prosecutor charged prison director Gregoria Salazar Robles and superintendent Jesus Fernando Dominguez Jaramillo for not maintaining the necessary security measures inside the prison. Investigators determined inmates had bats and metal bars that were used in the riot. Some cells did not have locks and inmates were out and about at times they should not have been.

== Aftermath ==
After the riot, authorities seized various kinds of contraband items, such as half a kilogram of marijuana, cocaine and other drugs, televisions, and USB memory sticks. Also dismantled were 'luxury cells'. Zetas leader Jorge Iván Hernández Cantú had his cell equipped with a king-size bed, a luxury bath and a huge television, other inmates had air conditioners, mini-fridges, aquariums and portable saunas. Police also dismantled 280 inmate-run food stalls, a bar and hundreds of altars to Santa Muerte, a death-like figure revered by many members of Mexico's drug cartels.

== Reactions ==
Nuevo Leon Governor Jaime Rodríguez Calderón blamed the rioting on "the old, outdated, obsolete system" under which Mexican prisons are run. During a visit to Mexico, Pope Francis sent a message of condolences to the archbishop of Monterrey and the families of those killed. Mexican president Enrique Peña Nieto said his administration will "continue to work in coordination with the state authorities" to secure the safety of the nation's often overcrowded and gang-controlled penitentiaries.

== See also ==
- Apodaca prison riot
- Altamira prison brawl

25°43′30″N 100°20′41″W
