= Paisa (disambiguation) =

Paisa is a monetary unit name used in South Asia.

Paisa may also refer to:

- Indian paisa, Indian monetary unit
- A person from the Paisa Region of Colombia
- An inmate of one of the prisons in Honduras who did not belong to a street gang
- Paisa (2014 film), an Indian Telugu-language film
- Paisa (2016 film), an Indian Tamil-language film
- Paisà, a 1946 Italian film directed by Roberto Rossellini, released in English as Paisan

== See also ==
- Paisa Paisa (disambiguation)
- Paisa Vasool (disambiguation)
