= 1994 Sabaneta fire =

Prison fire in Venezuela

1994 Sabaneta Prison Fire
- Date: 3 January 1994
- Location: Maracaibo National Prison (Sabaneta Prison), Maracaibo, Venezuela
- Type: Structure fire
- Cause: Probable Arson
- Motive: Disputed
- Deaths: 108

The Sabaneta prison fire was a fire that occurred on 3 January 1994 in a prison in Maracaibo, Venezuela, in which at least 108 inmates died. It is the tragedy that caused the most deaths in the country's prison history.

== Fire ==
It was estimated that the fire was set with gasoline by one of two warring groups in the prison and the gang "Los Goajiros" was blamed for it. However, Diario República reported that an internal source revealed that the day before an inmate had been decapitated and that soccer was played with his head, an event that had occurred before in December 1990; according to the source, the event infuriated the fellow inmates and they waited for the night to chain the exit doors and cause the fire. The fire demonstrated the shortcomings of the Venezuelan penal system and led to urgent decisions, including the intervention of the Sabaneta prison and criminal actions against the prison guards.

== See also ==
- 2018 Valencia, Venezuela fire
