= 2020 Cagua fire =

Venezuelan fire

- Location of Cagua
- Date: 23 January 2020
- Location: Agrícola del Lago sugar plantation, Cagua, Venezuela

Impacts
- Deaths: 11
- Injuries: 2

Ignition
- Cause: Uncontrolled sugarcane harvesting utility fire

On 23 January 2020, a fire was started in the Agrícola del Lago reed bed in Cagua, Aragua state, Venezuela. Eleven people were confirmed to have died as a result of the fire, all but two being minors.

== Fire ==
The fire started in Cagua on 23 January 2020, around 13:00 local time (VET), at the Agrícola del Lago reed bed sugarcane plantation, located in a popular extraction zone in the La Carpiera sector, in Cagua, Aragua state. The fire was under control by 22:00 but the authorities maintained a watch on it. Firefighter units from Aragua, Cagua and the Forestry Unit, state civil defense officials, rescue groups, as well as park rangers and Corposalud Aragua participated in the operation.

At 21:50 an official from the fire department declared that the incident was a "vegetation fire" that had started in the afternoon. Aragua's governor, Rodolfo Clemente Marco Torres, stated that investigations were under way to clarify the circumstances, and Douglas Rico, director of the Scientific, Penal, and Criminal Investigation Service Corps (CICPC), declared that officers had been deployed for the investigation.

Reports from the rescue teams initially indicated that the fire had claimed ten victims. The following day, Attorney General Tarek William Saab announced that at least eleven people died, nine of them minors, and announced that he had formed a commission headed by the state high prosecutor to investigate.

The young people who died had approached the area to hunt rabbits that were escaping from the fire, but a change in the wind direction spread the flames rapidly, and they were unable to get out of the burning plantation. According to Saab, this plantation periodically burned sugarcane in the process of harvesting. A relative of the victims noted that the owners of the plantation had started the fire during the day to burn sugarcane, as customary, but stressed that these types of fires are supposed to be set during the night, when temperatures are lower and there is less risk to neighbors, and that a firebreak should be in place to control the flames; the relative also claimed that this was not the first instance of plantation owners starting a fire during the daytime without taking the recommended precautions.

Residents of the area criticized the municipal government for leaving local firefighters without the necessary equipment to control the fire, including tanker trucks and water, which meant that the fire took hours to bring under control. They also drew attention to the government party official for Sucre Municipality, Miriam Pardo, who had spent millions of dollars to remodel a public square during her tenure.

The National Assembly deputy of Aragua, Karin Salanova, declared that the children had been hunting rabbits to feed themselves due to the precarious situation they lived in, noted that there were no ambulances in the area to transfer the injured to hospital, questioned the lack of supplies in the hospital where they were taken, the Central Hospital of Maracay—whose pediatrics wing was closed—and pointed out that regional authorities did not mobilize the Armed Forces to respond to the emergency.

== Victims ==
In the area where the fire took place, there were no health centers prepared for this type of emergency, which meant that the victims had to be transferred to several more distant centers in the region, including the Cagua Clinic, the Central Hospital of Maracay and San José Social Service, also in Maracay.

At least seven teenagers died during the fire; another two died in the Cagua Clinic and a tenth in the Central Hospital of Maracay, where one of the victims was receiving intensive care. On social media, some users posted messages asking for medical supplies to be brought to the health centers. Two twelve-year-old children were hospitalized in the intensive care unit of the Central Hospital of Maracay, in critical condition and with burns covering 30 percent of their bodies; one of them died during the night. The victims were aged between 10 and 18, with all but two being minors.

Juan Guaidó, Henrique Capriles, and Guaidó's presidential human rights commissioner, Humberto Prado, sent their condolences to the victims' relatives.

== See also ==
- 2018 Valencia, Venezuela fire
