= Cieneguillas prison riots =

Prison riots in Mexico in 2020

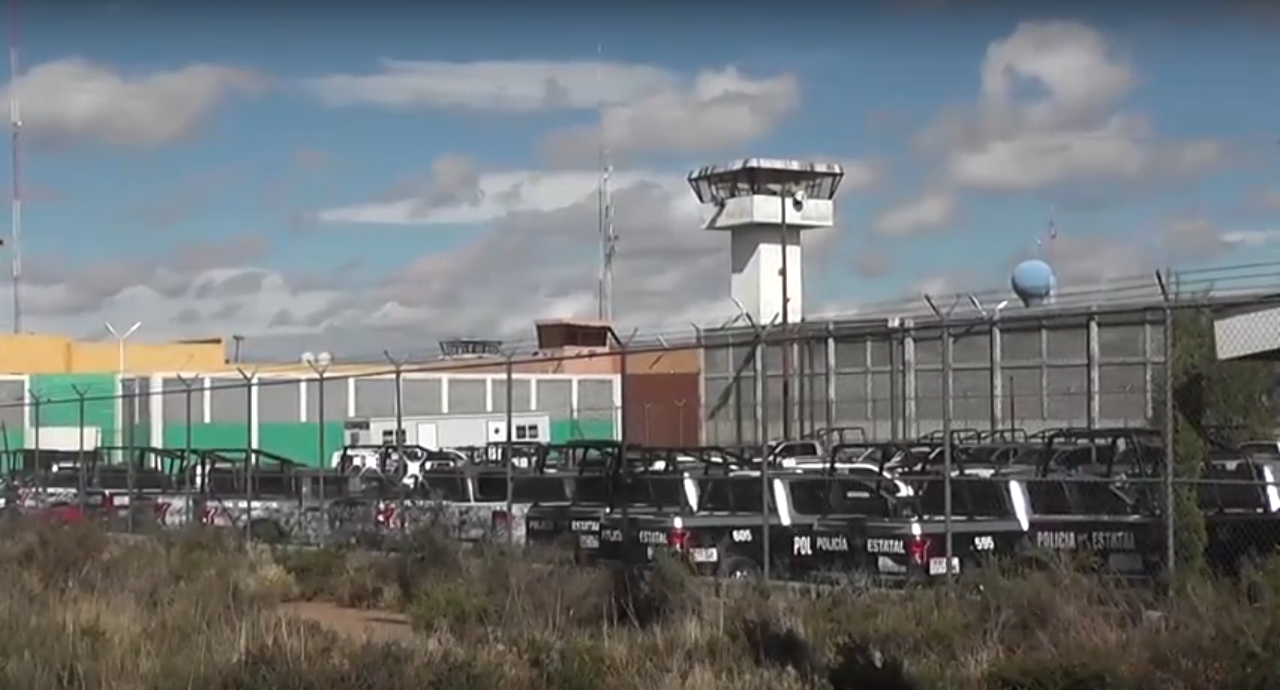
- The prison on 1 January 2020
- Date: 31 December 2019, 2 January 2020
- Location: Cieneguillas Prison, Zacatecas, Mexico; 22°45′46″N 102°40′16″W
- Caused by: Cartel war

Casualties
- Deaths: 17
- Injuries: 10

Two prison riots occurred at the Cieneguillas Regional Center for Social Reintegration in Cieneguillas, Zacatecas, Mexico. The first was on 31 December 2019, and the second on 2 January 2020. Sixteen inmates were killed on 31 December, and another inmate was killed on 2 January.

== Background ==
The Cieneguillas prison is a medium-security center. During the 2010s, inmates linked with various cartels, including Los Zetas, the Gulf Cartel, and the Sinaloa Cartel, were added to the prison. The prison became dangerous and failed several assessments due to the introduction of the cartel inmates, with the last assessment before the riots deeming it to have a lack of governance and an undermined security. The prison is sectioned so that members of different organizations, and those unaffiliated, are separated. However, when reporters from El Universal visited in 2019, authorities reported a lack of infrastructure to operate the prison optimally.

In 2009, the prison was the location of a high-profile escape that freed 53 inmates; a state official, speaking in 2019, said that steps had been taken to improve security after that event. There was also a plan to cause a riot on New Year's Eve in 2018, to allow another escape, but this was uncovered and prevented.

== Riots ==
=== New Year's Eve riot ===
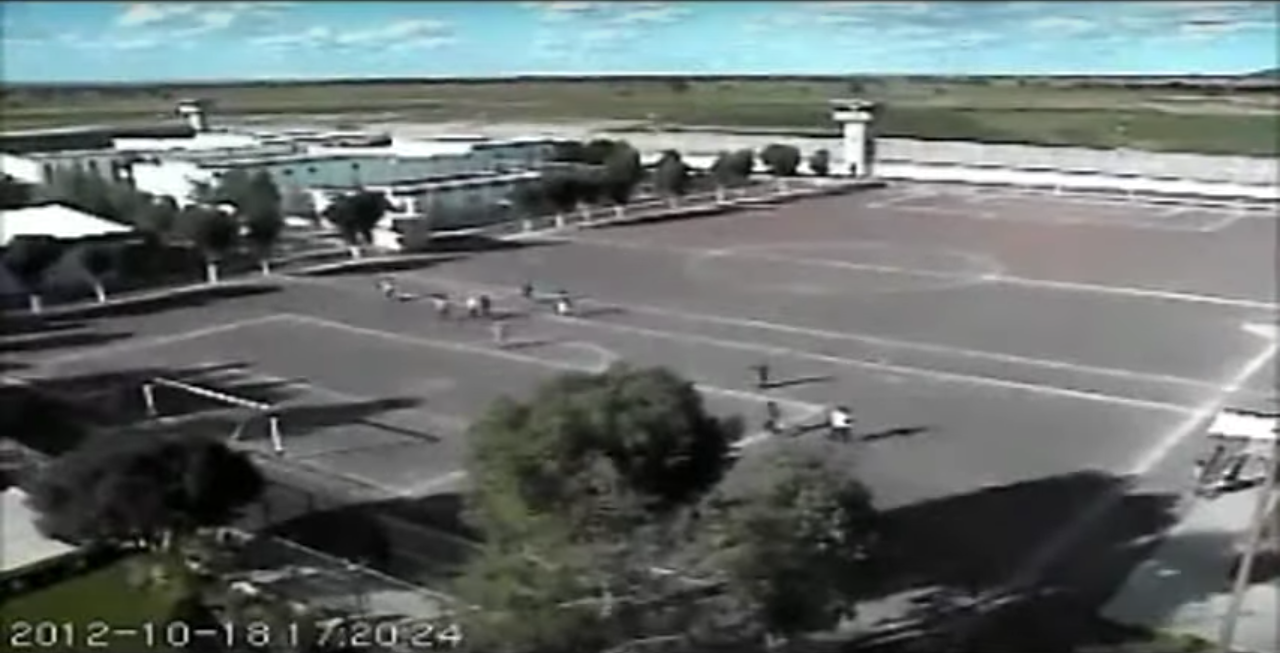
The prison's football pitch in 2012

The riot broke out at 2:30 pm local time (20:30 GMT) and lasted until about 5 pm local time. Inmates used weapons including knives and guns; when the situation was calmed, these were found, including one gun on the person of an inmate. It is reportedly not known how weapons entered the prison, but speculation from a state official suggested they could have been smuggled during visitation earlier the same day. A search for weapons had been conducted in the days before New Year's Eve. It is believed that the riot broke out due to fighting between different cartels, while local media reported that it was a dispute over a football game where old rivalries became inflamed again.

Visitors were still in the prison when the riot began, but were escorted out. Some of the visitors told the press that they had been able to see dead and injured inmates from the riot.

=== 2 January riot ===
After the first riot, the prison security announced that they were on alert for any reaction between the prisoners that may occur.

Another riot broke out in the morning of 2 January, less than 48 hours after the first. State security has said that the second riot broke out after fighting between inmates over the first riot. Inmates began attacking others who they believed betrayed them in the other riot. This riot was stopped more quickly; the prison's panic button had been immediately set off, with the state police and ambulance service alerted to the scene.

== Victims ==
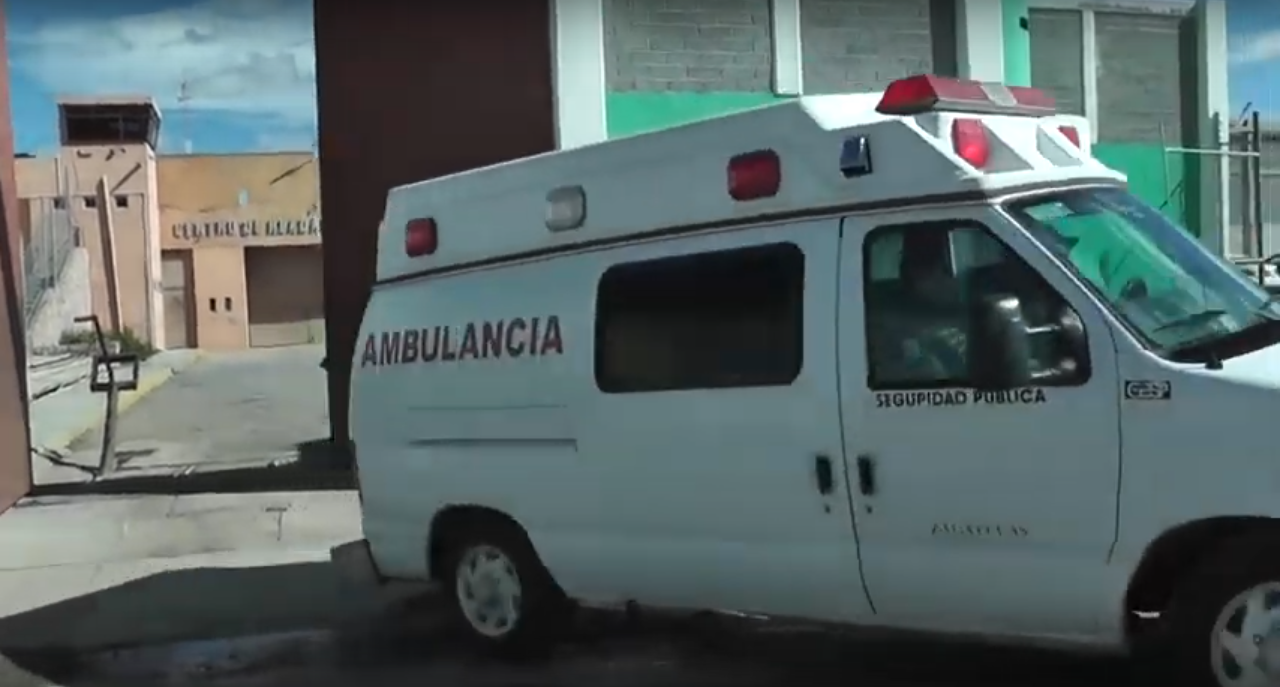
An ambulance leaving the prison after the first riot

In the first riot, sixteen inmates were killed and five others injured. Fifteen of those dead died in the prison, the other died later at a hospital. A state official said on 1 January that the deaths were variously caused by gunshot wounds, stab wounds, and being beaten. Only inmates were injured.

In the second riot, one inmate was killed, and another five injured. The prisoner who died was beaten by a metal cell door that others had taken off. All the injuries in this riot were also caused by beatings, not weapons.

== Response ==
An investigation was begun into various staff at the prison working shifts around the first riot. On 1 January, state officials said they increased the security inside and around the prison, and 120 inmates were relocated to prevent more rioting. However, the second riot occurred after these measures were taken.

After the second riot, the road from the town of Cieneguillas to the prison was closed, and access to the town from outside was also blocked. The Public Security Minister announced that 31 December riot took place between members of the Gulf Cartel and Sinaloa Cartel. The Security Minister for Zacatecas attended to the prison in person after the second riot. After the second riot, a total of 165 inmates were transferred to Guanajuato.

Elian Peltier of The New York Times said that it was "one of the worst outbreaks of violence in the country's troubled penal system for years". The director of the prison, Antonio Solís, was fired on 3 January, with former brigadier general Ignacio López Flores being made director on 8 January.
