= Jorge Lankenau =

Mexican banker and businessman (1944–2012)

- Born: April 16, 1944; Monterrey, Nuevo León, Mexico
- Died: June 16, 2012 (aged 68); San Pedro Garza García, Nuevo León, Mexico

Jorge Lankenau Rocha (16 April 1944 – 16 June 2012) was a Mexican banker and businessman born in Monterrey, Nuevo León. He was founder and president of Grupo Financiero Abaco, one of the most important financial groups in Mexico in the 1990's.

Jorge Lankenau Rocha serve as director of several banking institutions before establishing his own financial group. He was representative and vice president in Monterrey of Bank of America in 1984 and a year later, in 1985, with a group of investors, founded Casa de Bolsa Abaco. He owned one of the largest insurance companies in Mexico: ABA Seguros. He was also the former head of Abaco Grupo Financiero, he was the owner of Agua Sport, one of the largest water companies in Mexico, of its Mexican banking unit, Banca Confía, of the investment bank "Rodman y Renshaw" (headquartered in Chicago, Illinois), and of ABA Sport, a sportswear brand (the name was based on its insurance company) that sponsored Rayados de Monterrey, Tigres UANL, Santos, Chivas, Atl. Saltillo, Atlas, Olimpia, Estudiantes Tecos and finally the Mexico National Soccer Team.

With the reprivatization of the Mexican Bank in 1991, Lankenau Rocha, along with a group of investors, won the auction to acquire Banca Confía on April 4. August 1991, becoming the first Bank awarded to investors from Nuevo León (El Norte, January 28, 1992). After the acquisition of Confía, the businessman from Monterrey started an ambitious growth plan based on an aggressive marketing strategy and innovative marketing. Soon the green logo of Confía invaded billboards, pages of newspapers and magazines, television screens, soccer stadiums, baseball and even tennis courts. Banca Confía was the institution with the greatest growth during those years, reaching 300 branches by the end of 1992.

In addition to his business success, Lankenau Rocha was a great promoter of sports, art, culture, and recreation. He acquired the Club de Futbol Rayados de Monterrey, of which he served as president from 1991 to 1998, making him one of the prominent teams in the Mexican Soccer League. Thanks to the success achieved with the Rayados, Ábaco also sponsored the Mexican Soccer Team, making them train on the soccer fields of Cerrito, home of the Rayados de Monterrey. For his business leadership and for contributing to the development of the community, the Monterrey Chamber of Commerce awarded him the "Pedro Maiz Arsuada" award in December 1992 (El Norte December 26, 1992). Among other things, thanks to his sponsorship, The First Major League Baseball Series outside the United States and Canada was held in Monterrey from August 16 to 18, 1996, between the New York Mets and the San Diego Padres. Lankenau Rocha was one of the first Mexicans entrepreneurs to appear on the cover of The Wall Street Journal in 1996. The American newspaper dedicated a cover story to him, on which the management style, strategy, and structure of Grupo Financiero Ábaco was described as positive and surprising (The Wall Street Journal, March 8, 1996).

The history of the Ábaco Financial Group was captured in a case study by the Instituto Tecnológico y de Estudios Superiores de Monterrey to serve as material for discussion in classes on July 29, 2011. This case describes the formation of the group, its growth, and its strategy. Lankenau owned Agua Sport, one of the biggest water companies in Mexico.

On November 17, 1997, Lankenau Rocha appeared at Topo Chico Penitentiary in Monterrey to testify for a fraud claim concerning offshore operations, also known as investments in "tax havens", and the authorities awaited him with an arrest warrant. He was initially kept under house arrest in Monterrey, but was imprisoned in Topo Chico on November 17, 1997, and served for 8 years, due to charges of fraud, tax evasion, and crimes established in the (Mexican Credit Institutions Law). On December 25, 2005, he was released after paying $53 million MXN. In December 2003, he was granted a judicial pardon from 113 of the 250 plaintiffs. He was pursued by 48 different charges, but was found not guilty of each and every one.

After suffering a stroke in September 2009, Lankenau Rocha died on June 16, 2012, at the age of 68, leaving a mark on Mexican business, culture, and sports. (El Norte, June 17, 2012).Lankenau was arrested on August 30, 1997 on suspicion of defrauding 250 people of a total of USD170 million. He was initially kept under house arrest in Monterrey, but was imprisoned in Topo Chico on November 17, 1997 and held there for 8 years, on charges of fraud, tax evasion, and offenses under the Mexican Ley de Instituciones de Crédito (Credit Institutions Act). On December 25, 2005 he was freed after paying MXN 53 million. In December 2003, he was granted a judicial pardon by 113 of the 250 complainants. He was tried on 48 different charges but was found innocent of every single one.

He died on June 16, 2012, at the age of 68.
