= Paisa Paisa =

Paisa Paisa may refer to these in Indian entertainment:

- Paisa Paisa (2017 film), an Indian Telugu-language film
- Paisa Paisa (2016 film), an Indian Marathi-language film by Joji Raechal Job
- Paisa Paisa (2013 film), an Indian Malayalam-language film
- "Paisa Paisa" (2009 song), the theme song for the 2009 Indian Hindi-language film De Dana Dan
- "Paisa Paisa" (2007 song), a song from the Tamil version of the 2007 Indian Hindi-language film Guru
- "Paisa Paisa", a song by Suzanne D'Mello and Hamza Faruqui in the 2006 Indian Hindi-language film Apna Sapna Money Money
- "Paisa Paisa", a 2002 Punjabi song by Daler Mehndi from the album Nach Ni Shaam Kaure
  - "Paisa Paisa", remake by Mehndi for the 2014 Indian film Namo Bhootatma

== See also ==
- Paisa (disambiguation)
- Paisa Yeh Paisa, a 1985 Indian Bollywood film
- "Paisa Hai Power", a song by Dibyendu Mukherjee from the 2009 film Aa Dekhen Zara
