= Tuluá prison riot =

2022 fire in Colombia

- Tuluá prison riot (Colombia)
- Date: 28 June 2022
- Location: Tuluá, Valle del Cauca Department, Colombia; 04°05′37″N 76°11′28″W
- Type: Prison riot, fire
- Deaths: 52
- Injuries: 34

On 28 June 2022, a fire broke out during a riot inside a prison in Tuluá, Colombia killing at least 52 people and injuring at least 34.

== Background ==
In Colombia, and many other Latin American countries, prisons are highly overcrowded with riots a common issue. Colombia's prison system, which has the capacity to hold 81,000 inmates, currently houses about 97,000 per official figures. In March 2020 a riot in the La Modelo prison in Bogota, killed 24 inmates and injured 90 others over fears of COVID-19. The Tuluá prison was operating at 117% capacity, housing about 1,267 inmates and the cell block where the fire occurred housed 180.

== Fire and riot ==
Around 2:00 am on 28 June 2022, a fight had broken out among the prisoners, and one inmate reportedly set fire to a mattress during the fight. Other sources have claimed that the disturbance was not a fight but a prisoners' protest or a prison escape attempt. Flames from the first fire quickly spread throughout the prison wing and penitentiary personnel attempted to put the fire out but were unable to and had to wait for firefighters to arrive. While they waited for first responders, prison guards evacuated a majority of the inmates to other prison blocks.

== Victims ==
General Tito Castellanos, the director of INPEC prison agency, confirmed that a total of 51 people had died due to the fire, with 49 victims reported deceased at the prison and an additional two declared deceased after being taken to hospital. A majority of the victims died due to smoke inhalation, according to Castellanos.

== Reactions ==
Outgoing Colombian President Ivan Duque was in Portugal at the time of the fire and expressed his solidarity with the victims and their families and his sorrow over the tragedy. President-elect Gustavo Petro called the fire a massacre and linked it to the previous deaths in La Modelo prison in 2020, while calling for prison reform and expressing his sympathies to families of the deceased on social media.

== See also ==
- Bogotá prison riot
