= Bogotá prison riot =

Prison riot

On 21 March 2020, at least 23 prisoners were killed and 83 injured during a riot which erupted in La Modelo prison in Bogotá, Colombia, amid fears over the spread of SARS-CoV-2 on its premises during the COVID-19 pandemic. Prisoners across the country had been protesting against overcrowding as well as poor health services since the outbreak of COVID-19.

== See also ==
- Tuluá prison riot
