= Maracaibo National Prison (Sabaneta Prison) =

Former prison in Maracaibo, Venezuela

- Location: Maracaibo, Zulia, Venezuela
- Status: Closed
- Capacity: 700
- Population: 3700 (2013)
- Opened: 1958
- Closed: 2013
- Managed by: Venezuelan Ministry of Prison Services

The Maracaibo National Prison (Sabaneta Prison) was a notoriously violent prison in the city of Maracaibo, Venezuela in the state of Zulia. It was operated by the Ministry of Prison Systems, most recently under minister Iris Varela, from 1958-2013. Typical of a Venezuelan prison, it was severely overcrowded, with inadequate access to medical care, food, and clean water, and violence among prisoners was common. Gangs of inmates had control over the prison, and were led by a "pran" (inmate leader). The prison was closed after 55 years of operation due to government intervention and is now being converted into a museum.

== Facilities ==
=== Prison life ===
Home of 3,700 inmates, the overcrowded prison was built to occupy 700 prisoners as of 2013. Of this number, an estimated 192 of them were children of the inmates. The prison was run by prisoners themselves, following the trend of 80% of Venezuelan prisons which are run by their prisoners. As the population continued to grow inside Maracaibo National Prison, it far exceeded its intended population.

=== Structure ===
Throughout its construction in 1958, Maracaibo National Prison was split into 4 main areas. The first of which Procemil was formed to house military officers and police agents. Reeducation hosted criminals with light charges. Prison contained a variety of standard prisoners. Maximum housed the criminals with the most serious charges.

== Notable incidents ==
=== 1994 Riot and Fire ===
On January 3, 1994, a riot broke out in the prison as a result of ongoing gang activity. A fire was started by a group of inmates, and then they subsequently shot or stabbed other inmates who tried to escape the fire. While there is some dispute over the number of casualties and injuries during the incident, many more prisoners were killed when security personnel attempted to take control of the prison, with some sources claiming over 150 casualties. This riot brought attention to the poor conditions in Venezuelan prisons and is often cited as one of the deadliest prison incidents to date.

=== Other riots ===
Smaller riots also occurred regularly in Maracaibo National Prison, with authorities claiming it to be gang violence among prisoners. In 2012 it was reported that as few as 8 wardens were on duty at any time, with an additional 32 Venezuelan National Guard officers patrolling the outside. Due to this lack of security personnel, gang violence was common, with 69 prisoners killed in 2013 alone.

=== Raids ===
While the governmental control over the prison was weak, raids by government forces frequently yielded massive amounts of weapons and drugs. One raid even discovered a collection of jungle animals housed in the prison, including a few endangered species.

== Notable inmates ==
Mocho Edwin was the "pran" in Maracaibo National Prison at the prison's closing. He was first imprisoned in 2006 but was soon after released in 2007. Since then, he was sent to Maracaibo for committing triple homicide. Edwin was known for drug sales and prostitution throughout the prison and connections with the outside world after being seen with Iris Varela.

== In media ==
Maracaibo National Prison is often viewed as a place of terror. With constant gang violence and death, reporters have placed a veil of violence over the prison. Some consider it to be one of the world's most dangerous prisons to live in. Local news sources stress the overcrowded nature of the prison and poor living conditions. It often appeared in sensationalized articles of many dangerous prisons and bloody massacres.

== Closing ==
In 2013 after a riot killing 16 inmates, the Maracaibo National Prison was closed. There are currently plans to reopen the prison as a museum for citizens to visit the sites of famous massacres and learn about the historical running of corrupt prison systems. It is known that "Mocho Edwin" put up a fight, and refused to leave his kingdom within La Sabaneta upon its closure.

== Reopening ==
In August 2023, the Venezuelan Prison Observatory reported that local residents feared the Sabaneta prison had been reopened.

== See also ==
- Government of Venezuela
- Iris Varela
- Yare Prison
- Yare Prison Riot
- Zulia
