= 2012 Yare prison riot =

2012 riot by armed prisoners in Venezuela

- Date: 20 August 2012
- Location: Yare I prison complex, Miranda state, Venezuela
- Methods: Prison riot

Casualties
- Deaths: 25 (inmates); 1 (visitor)
- Injuries: 29 (inmates); 14 (visitors)

On 20 August 2012, armed prisoners in the Yare I prison complex, an overcrowded prison in Miranda state near Caracas, Venezuela, rioted. A shootout between two groups resulted in the deaths of 25 people, one of them a visitor. Among those injured during the incident were 29 inmates and 14 visitors.

== Background ==
Venezuela's prison system is heavily overcrowded; its facilities have capacity for only 14,000 prisoners, yet house over 50,000 inmates. More than 300 prisoners die every year, and not all of it is due to overcrowding. Prisoners have easy access to machine guns, grenades, and narcotics. According to the Venezuelan Prisons Observatory, in the first half of 2012 clashes between prison gangs left 304 dead – a 15% increase from the same period last year.

Following the 2011 riots in El Rodeo I and El Rodeo II prisons, where dozens of inmates were killed respectively, President Hugo Chávez announced a program to reduce the violence and the overcrowding in Venezuela's prison systems.

With an upcoming presidential election, the prison chaos in Venezuela was a politically sensitive issue for Venezuela's president. Chávez blamed the past regimes before he took office in 1999 for the current problems in Venezuela's prison system, while Henrique Capriles Radonski, the opposition leader, stated on Twitter after the prison riot that Chávez's administration has been oblivious of reforms.

The deadliest prison massacre in Venezuela's history occurred in 1994 at Maracaibo National Jail, where around 130 inmates were burned to death or butchered with machetes during a gang fight and ethnic feud.

== Incident ==
Inside the Yare I prison complex near Caracas on 20 August 2012, a clash between two prison gangs left 25 dead and 43 wounded. The brawl started after a gunshot was fired during a discussion between the gang leaders of the two factions, although the shot did not hit anyone. The gun battle between the two gangs vying for the control of the prison lasted over four hours, bringing the death toll to over 500 since the Government of Venezuela implemented a Prison Ministry to reform the country's prison system since July 2011. About 980 women were on a visit trip at the prison when the riot occurred, and some of the relatives decided to stay inside because they were scared of how the security forces outside the prison would react.

Local media reports indicated that the tension inside the prison may have started after several inmates were transferred to Yare I from La Planta, an overcrowded prison near Caracas that was closed after a series of violent incidents back in May 2012.

Security experts believe that Venezuela's penitentiary system remains a "cauldron of violence" because the prison gangs rule the facilities, have easy access to weapons, and are too powerful for the corrupt and ineffective prison authorities.

== Reactions ==
Venezuelan Prisons Minister Iris Varela responded that "we will make them answer for this."

Opposition leader and presidential candidate Henrique Capriles tweeted, "The transformation of the Venezuelan prison system is another big lie that we've been told by this government. How many more will die?"

== See also ==
- 2013 Uribana prison riot
