= Cieneguillas, Argentina =

Town in Jujuy province, Argentina

Coordinates: 22°06′05″S 65°52′03″W

Cieneguillas is an Argentine town located in the Santa Catalina Department of the Jujuy province. It is located at the intersection of National 40 and Provincial 87 routes, 34 km west of the city of La Quiaca and 28 km southeast of the Santa Catalina departmental capital.
