= 2010 Santiago prison fire =

Prison fire in Santiago, Chile

Coordinates: 33°29′55.1″S 70°38′44.5″W

- Date: 8 December 2010; 15 years ago
- Time: 5:30 a.m.
- Location: Santiago, Chile
- Deaths: 81
- Injuries: 19

The 2010 Santiago prison fire occurred in the San Miguel prison in Santiago, Chile on 8 December 2010, in which 81 inmates were killed, making it the country's deadliest prison incident.

The fire broke out at 5:30 am Chile Daylight Time (8:30am GMT) on the fourth floor during a fight between rival gangs. An improvised flamethrower was reportedly used, setting mattresses and other flammable material alight. Those killed were trapped behind closed gates.

Local firefighters took around three hours to bring the fire under control.

At least 81 inmates were reported killed, and 14 suffered life-threatening burns, according to the Health Minister Jaime Mañalich. One firefighter and two prison guards also suffered lesser injuries. According to Chile's Fundacion Paz Ciudadana, the prison's capacity is 892, but was heavily overcrowded with 1,654 inmates. An investigation determined that there was not a suitable emergency procedure in place.

According to officials, firefighters received the first emergency call at 5:48 a.m., about 18 minutes after the fire began. The prison held about 1,900 inmates, nearly double its design capacity, and only six guards were on duty inside at the time, with 26 more stationed outside. The incident occurred on a scheduled visiting day, and thousands of relatives who were already gathered outside reacted with confusion as authorities read survivors’ names.

Eleven guards and one firefighter were injured in addition to the 81 inmates who died.

The incident prompted Chile's president Sebastián Piñera to launch an investigation and he called for an end to the overcrowding in the country's prison system, saying: "We cannot keep living with a prison system which is absolutely inhumane. We are going to speed up the process to ensure our country has a humane, dignified prison system that befits a civilised country."

== See also ==
- Comayagua prison fire
