= Acarigua =

- City
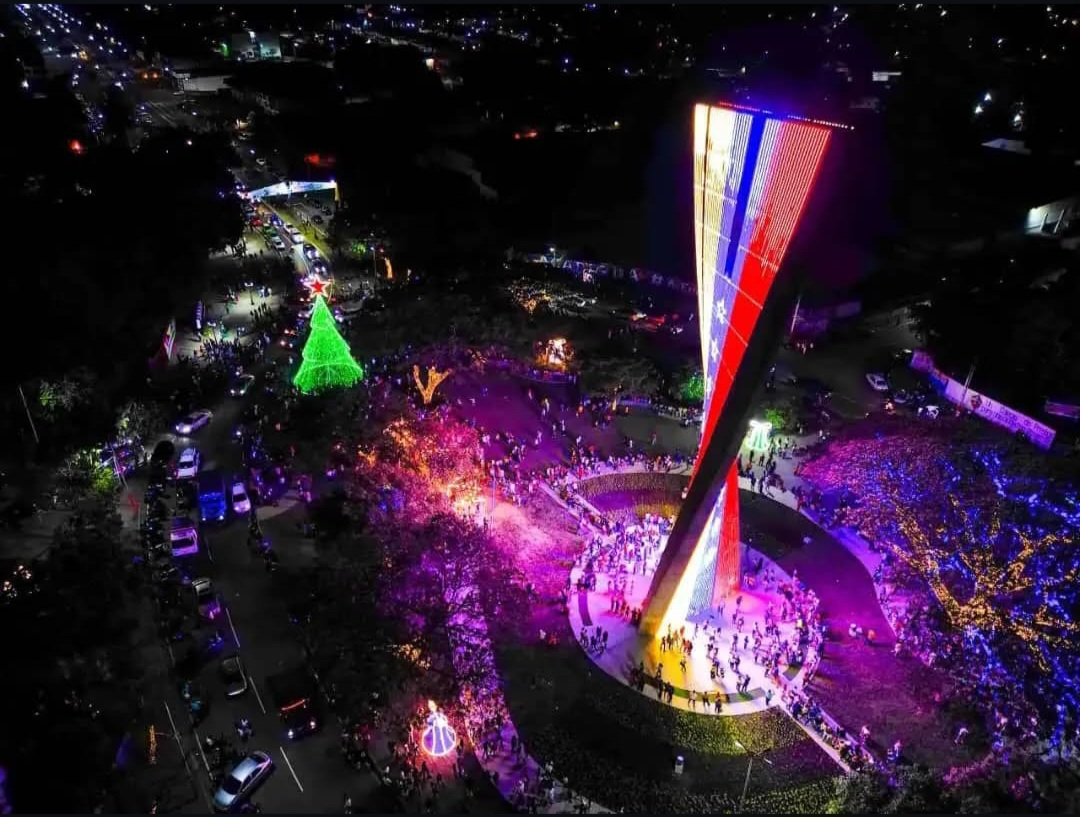
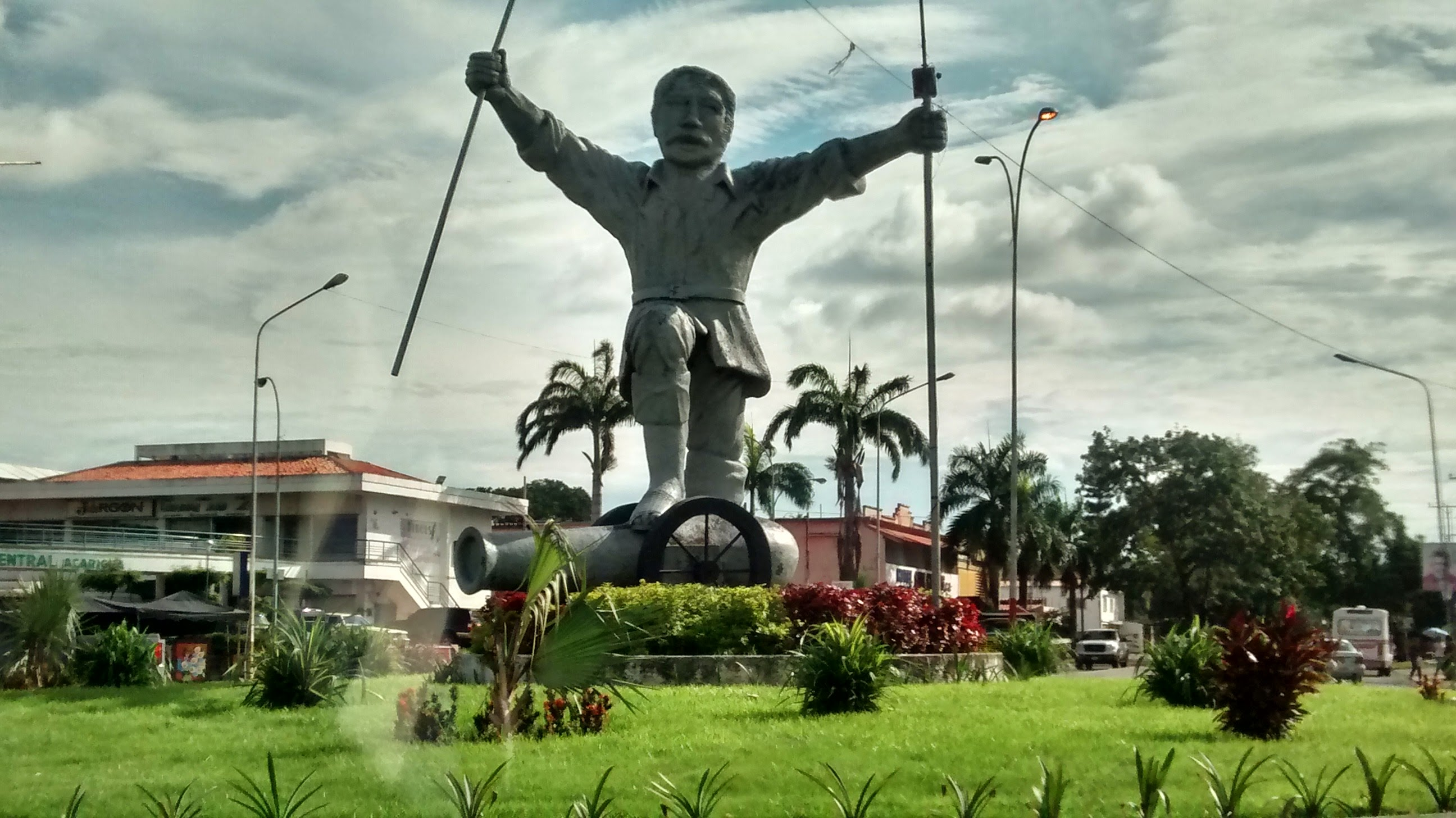
- La Espiga monument Statue of Portuguesa in December 5 Square

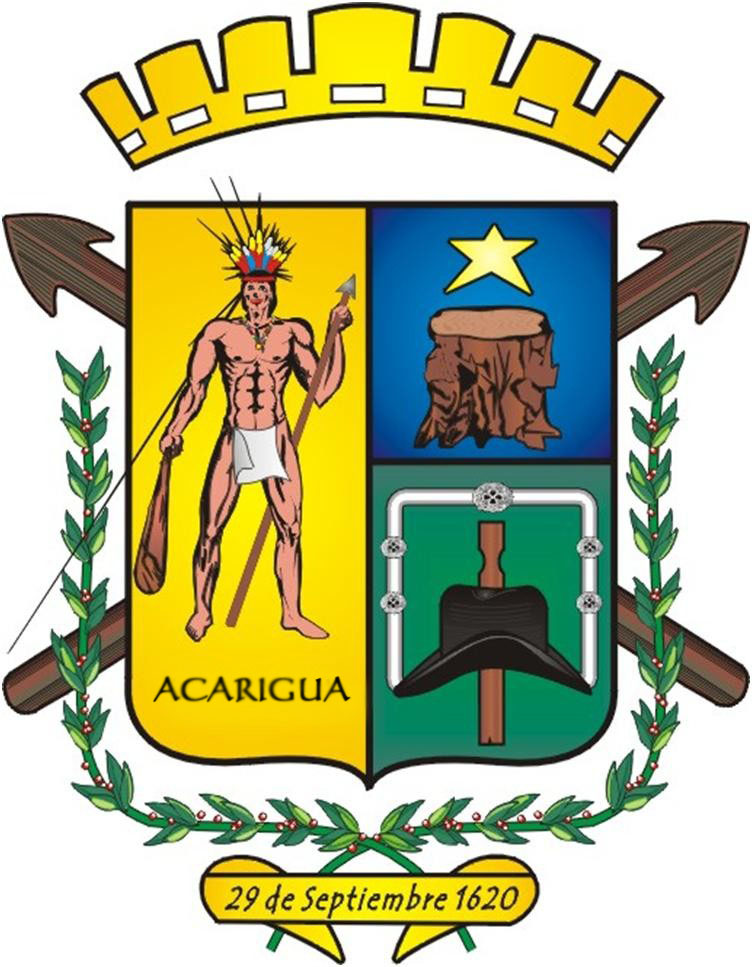
- Coat of arms

- Location in Venezuela Acarigua (South America)
- Coordinates: 9°33′35″N 69°12′7″W
- Country: Venezuela
- State: Portuguesa State
- Municipality: Páez Municipality
- Founded: September 29, 1620

Area
  - City: 175 km^{2} (68 sq mi)
- Elevation: 195 m (640 ft)

Population (2012)
  - City: 203,358
  - Density: 1,160/km^{2} (3,010/sq mi)
  - Metro: 208,495
- Demonym: Acarigüeño (a)
- Time zone: UTC-4:30 (VST)
- Postal code: 3301
- Area code: 0255
- Climate: Aw
- Website: Municipal website

Acarigua (Spanish pronunciation: [akaˈɾiɣwa]), founded as San Miguel de Acarigua in 1620, is a city in northwestern Venezuela, in the northern part of the state of Portuguesa and its former capital. It encompasses the Páez municipality.

It is a major commercial center for the northern Llanos region of South America. It is contiguous with the neighboring city of Araure.

== Etymology ==
The name Acarigua comes from the indigenous word Hacarygua, given to the land by the indigenous Gayón people. The name San Miguel de Acarigua, given to the area by Spanish conquistadores, follows the Spanish Catholic tradition of naming cities after saints.

== History ==
The first accounts of the Hacarygua territory was in the writings of German colonizer Nicolás Federmann, who arrived in one of the area's indigenous villages on December 15, 1530. He was headed to southwestern Llanos territory to search for the mythical city of El Dorado. In the winter of 1535, German colonizer Jorge Spira sought shelter and food during his travels in what is now Acarigua.

It was established as the state capital of Portuguesa in 1927, but ten years later in 1937 Guanare took its place.

== Demographics ==
The city's population was 116,551 in 1990 and was estimated at 208,495 in 2008. In 2012 the population was 143,704. In 2020 the population of the Páez municipality was 216,827.

== Religion ==
Its Cathedral Catedral de Nuestra Señora de la Corteza is the episcopal see of the Roman Catholic Diocese of Acarigua–Araure.

== Geography ==
=== Climate ===
Acarigua is in a tropical savanna wet (Aw) Koppen climate type region.

Climate data for Acarigua (1991–2020 normals, extremes 1971–2020)
Month	Jan	Feb	Mar	Apr	May	Jun	Jul	Aug	Sep	Oct	Nov	Dec	Year
Record high °C (°F)	37.4 (99.3)	37.6 (99.7)	39.5 (103.1)	39.8 (103.6)	37.7 (99.9)	39.9 (103.8)	34.9 (94.8)	36.2 (97.2)	39.7 (103.5)	36.6 (97.9)	37.0 (98.6)	36.8 (98.2)	39.9 (103.8)
Mean daily maximum °C (°F)	33.7 (92.7)	34.4 (93.9)	35.2 (95.4)	34.1 (93.4)	32.2 (90.0)	31.3 (88.3)	31.0 (87.8)	31.4 (88.5)	32.0 (89.6)	32.1 (89.8)	32.6 (90.7)	33.0 (91.4)	32.8 (91.0)
Daily mean °C (°F)	26.3 (79.3)	27.1 (80.8)	27.8 (82.0)	27.8 (82.0)	26.8 (80.2)	25.8 (78.4)	25.4 (77.7)	25.7 (78.3)	26.0 (78.8)	26.3 (79.3)	26.3 (79.3)	26.4 (79.5)	26.5 (79.7)
Mean daily minimum °C (°F)	21.9 (71.4)	22.5 (72.5)	23.3 (73.9)	23.9 (75.0)	23.4 (74.1)	22.4 (72.3)	22.0 (71.6)	22.3 (72.1)	22.5 (72.5)	22.7 (72.9)	22.7 (72.9)	22.2 (72.0)	22.6 (72.7)
Record low °C (°F)	16.6 (61.9)	16.6 (61.9)	18.2 (64.8)	18.2 (64.8)	17.6 (63.7)	17.6 (63.7)	17.4 (63.3)	17.4 (63.3)	17.1 (62.8)	19.0 (66.2)	18.5 (65.3)	17.0 (62.6)	16.6 (61.9)
Average precipitation mm (inches)	15.6 (0.61)	11.8 (0.46)	25.9 (1.02)	109.7 (4.32)	157.1 (6.19)	230.8 (9.09)	212.0 (8.35)	184.5 (7.26)	161.5 (6.36)	177.8 (7.00)	92.5 (3.64)	48.7 (1.92)	1,427.9 (56.22)
Average precipitation days (≥ 1.0 mm)	2.2	1.6	3.1	8.2	13.0	18.4	17.5	16.2	13.3	12.7	7.3	5.7	119.2
Average relative humidity (%)	68	66	65	72	81	85	85	86	85	84	80	74	78
Mean monthly sunshine hours	254.2	229.6	229.4	159.0	148.8	150.0	182.9	195.3	189.0	201.5	216.0	235.6	2,391.3
Mean daily sunshine hours	8.2	8.2	7.4	5.3	4.8	5.0	5.9	6.3	6.3	6.5	7.2	7.6	6.6
Source: NOAA (humidity and sun 1971–1990)

=== Fauna ===
Fauna of the area includes macaws, jaguars, howler monkeys, pumas, and moths. The Thysania agrippina is one of the world's largest moths, with wings 32 centimetres (13 in) in size, and can be found in Acarigua.

=== Flora ===
The saman or Samanea saman is the most widespread tree throughout the city.

=== Protected areas ===
- Parque Musiu Carmelo
- Parque Mittar Nakichenovich
- Balneario Sabanetica
- Balneario el Mamón
- Parque Curpa, popularly known as José Antonio Páez Park.

== Agriculture ==
Acarigua is a principal commercial center of the northern portion of the Llanos (plains), in which cattle, peanuts, sorghum, cashews, beans, cotton, corn (maize), and rice are the principal products.

== Media ==
Acarigua is home to 3 regional newspapers, and the community TV station Siguaraya TV.

== Transport ==
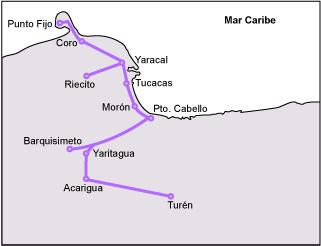
Map of the Central Western Railway System (Spanish: Sistema Ferroviario Centro Occidental de Venezuela)

Acarigua is served by the Oswaldo Guevara Mujica Airport and the Central Western Railway System. The main access road into the city is the José Antonio Páez Highway.

== Sports ==
It is home to Portuguesa FC, whose home stadium is the Estadio General José Antonio Paez. Other sports facilities in the city include the Estadio Bachiller Julio Hernández Molina, the Wilbaldo Zabaleta Indoor Gym, and the Cancha Techada 19 de Abril de la Urb. La Goajira.

== Notable people ==
- Luis Antonio Herrera Campins (1925-2007), was President of Venezuela

== See also ==
- Araure
- 2019 Portuguesa, Venezuela prison uprising
