= Paisa Vasool =

Paisa Vasool (transl. bang for the buck) may refer to:

- Paisa Vasool (2004 film), an Indian film
- Paisa Vasool (2017 film), an Indian Telugu-language action comedy film
