= Prisons in Honduras =

Prisons in Honduras house an estimated 12,000 prisoners in Honduras, with a general population of 8 million. There have been a number of massacres, including 69 people killed in a rural prison outside La Ceiba called La Granja (The Farm) in April 2003. On April 26, 2008, 9 people were massacred in a prison located in the center of San Pedro Sula. On May 3, 2008, 18 prisoners were massacred in a prison to the north of Tegucigalpa, the capital city of Honduras. Due to problems with street gangs, prisoners are divided into 3 groups: Maras (active gang members), Pesetas (former gang members) and paisas (those who have never been in a gang before their incarceration).

== Actual population ==
Penitentiary	Construction materials	Construction year	Population 2013	Design capacity	Occupancy rates
Centro Penal de Yoro	Adobe, wood and tile	1870	191	150	127%
Centro Penal de Trujillo	Adobe, brick and lamina	1890	309	120	258%
Centro Penal de La Ceiba	Adobe, wood and tile	1906	284	100	284%
Centro Penal La Esperanza, Intibucá	Adobe, wood, tile	1937	301	100	301%
Centro Penal de Santa Bárbara	Adobe, wood and tile	1940	195	70	279%
Centro Penal de Puerto Cortés	Block, brick and tile	1950	153	50	306%
Penitencieria Nacional de San Pedro Sula	Adobe. brick and lamina	1953	2,216	800	277%
Centro Penal de Olanchito	Block, brick and lamina	1961	144	60	240%
Centro Penal de Puerto Lempira	Block, wood and lamina	1967	61	20	305%
P.N. Femenina	Block, concrete, lamina, brick	1974	164	200	82%
Centro Penal de Marcala	Block, brick and lamina	1975	123	120	102%
Centro Penal de Tela	Block, brick and lamina	1975	123	160	77%
Centro Penal de El Progreso	Block, brick and lamina	1976	402	120	335%
Centro Penal de Comayagua	Block, concrete, lamina, brick	1978	471	240	196%
Centro Penal de Nacaome	Block. concrete, lamina and brick	1978	220	120	183%
Centro Penal de Danlí	Block, concrete, lamina, brick	1980	482	240	201%
Centro Penal de Santa Rosa de Copán	Block, brick and tile	1980	602	240	251%
P. N. de El Porvenir, La Ceiba	Block, concrete, lamina and brick	1980	445	240	185%
P.N. de La Paz	Block, concrete, lamina and brick	1984	208	120	173%
P.N. Marco Aurelio Soto	Block, concrete, lamina and brick	1998	2,844	2,500	114%
P.N. de Choluteca	Block, concrete, lamina and brick	2001	562	800	70%
Centro Penal de Ocotepeque	Block, concrete and brick	2001	158	153	103%
P.N. de Gracias, Lempira	Block, concrete, lamina, brick	2002	561	600	94%
P.N. de Juticalpa	Block, concrete and lamina	2007	454	800	57%
Cárcel de El Pozo	Block, concrete, lamina	2016		2,000	
Total / average / median		1967 average 1976 median	11,673 total 486 average 293 median	8,123 total 338 average 152 median	192%

== See also ==
- Comayagua prison fire
