= Comayagua prison fire =

Deadly 2012 fire in Honduras

Coordinates: 14°26′47.5″N 87°38′33.9″W

- Date: 14–15 February 2012
- Location: Comayagua, Honduras

Impacts
- Deaths: 361

Ignition
- Cause: Accidental

A deadly fire occurred on 14–15 February 2012 at the National Penitentiary in Comayagua, Honduras, killing 361 people. Prisoners trapped in their cells died by burning or suffocation; dozens were burned beyond recognition. The fire started late in the evening of 14 February. According to one prisoner, calls for help went out almost immediately and "for a while, nobody listened. But after a few minutes, which seemed like an eternity, a guard appeared with keys and let us out." Rescue forces did not arrive until about 40 minutes later.

With a death toll of 361, this is the deadliest prison fire ever recorded.

== Casualties ==
The death toll was initially announced at 382, but was lowered after firefighters stated that 353 bodies were found dead in the scene, with five more hospitalized. Several more died from their injuries afterwards, bringing the final death toll to 361.

There were 856 prisoners officially listed on the roster for the prison; more than half of these were not yet convicted of any crime and were being held awaiting trial or even indictment. The Comayagua prison is considered a medium security facility, but many of the inmates were being housed for serious crimes, such as murder and armed robbery. Around 475 prisoners escaped from the fire, many through the roof of the facility. Several prisoners jumped over the walls of the prison to escape the fire, but were reportedly shot at by prison guards. According to firefighters, around 100 inmates burned to death or suffocated in their cells as the keys to release them could not be located. Around 30 prisoners were transported to the capital to receive specialist treatment for severe burns. Paola Castro, the local governor, claimed that she called the Red Cross and the firefighters, but it took them around 20 to 30 minutes to get to the prison, when most of the fire had nearly subsided.

The chief of forensic medicine for the prosecutor's office stated that it would take at least three months to identify all of the victims, mainly from DNA samples.

The Comayagua prison did not utilize smoke detectors, a fire sprinkler system, fire alarm pull stations, manual fire extinguishers, nor any other fire protection system, any of which could have potentially slowed the spread of the fire or alerted authorities sooner.

== Cause ==
An investigation by the U.S. Bureau of Alcohol, Tobacco and Firearms (ATF) determined that the cause was most likely an open flame that accidentally ignited combustible materials, although they were unable to recover the source. Other causes such as lightning, an electrical fault, or an accelerant were ruled out. There was also a witness who described to investigators that an inmate had fallen asleep while smoking. Because of overcrowding, prisoners were housed in bunk beds in stacks of four. They typically created privacy for themselves by isolating their bunks with wood panels, bed sheets, towels, or drapery. The mattresses were also flammable, being made of thin cloth surrounding a polyurethane core. As a result, the fire was able to spread quickly.

This conclusion was not accepted by many of the relatives of the deceased. One reason may be that Honduran officials gave out conflicting information on the cause. Governor Castro first stated that an inmate was responsible, and survivors initially reported that an inmate shouted "We will all die here!" before setting fire to his bedding. Castro later retracted her statement, and prison authorities instead blamed it on an electrical fault. Relatives of the victims were in disbelief of the ATF's determination, arguing that the prisoners would have quickly put the fire out themselves.

The Comayagua fire is the fourth prison fire in Honduras since 1994 to result in 70 or more casualties. In addition, it was reported that firefighters were unable to aid the victims right away because they heard "gunshots inside the prison," and also because they did not have the keys to enter the cells. The Soto Cano Air Base, just 15 minutes away from the prison, provided U.S. and Honduran aid at around 10:20.

== Aftermath ==
Relatives of the prisoners gathered outside the facility to discover the fate of the incarcerated, eventually leading to clashes with the police. Angry family members attempted to storm the prison to claim the remains of deceased inmates and were restrained with tear gas. Some were seen hurling rocks at police officers. The President of Honduras, Porfirio Lobo Sosa, demanded a full inquest into the disaster. The Honduran authorities asked the families to "remain calm" despite the "difficult situations" in order to continue with the investigation.

After the fire, Ron W. Nikkel, the president of the Prison Fellowship International, mentioned that the prison was one of the "worst prisons" he had seen when he visited the facility in 2005. Nikkel mentioned that the overpopulated cells, the constant prison riots and the inadequate conditions of the prison had brought to light the harsh and terrible conditions of Honduran prisons. Vivanco said that "[the] horrendous tragedy [was] the result of prison conditions that are symptomatic of the country’s larger public security crisis." The Proceso magazine mentioned that prisons in Honduras were made to accommodate and support up to 6,000 prisoners, but they currently have more than 12,000 inmates. The prison had over 800 inmates, more than twice its intended capacity. The United States Department of State issued a report which said that the prisoners suffered from "malnutrition, overpopulation, and unsanitary facilities." They also mentioned that the prisoners have "easy access to firearms" and they often go unpunished. The security minister of Honduras claimed in 2010 that the overpopulation of the prisons makes them "universities of crime." A number of inmates are thought to have used the chaos of the fire to escape.

President Porfirio Lobo Sosa promised a "full and transparent" investigation for the "unacceptable" tragedy. Mexican President Felipe Calderón reiterated Mexico's solidarity with the Honduran community and pledged to send medics and aid. The National Congress said it would send 14 experts to help identify the burned victims. The United States sent agents from the Bureau of Alcohol, Tobacco, Firearms and Explosives to help investigate the fire at the request of the Honduran government. Israel's ambassador to Honduras said he would relay an offer from an Israeli company to construct four new prisons utilizing high safety and security measures.

== See also ==
- Prisons in Honduras
- 2010 Santiago prison fire
- List of fires
- Politics of Honduras
