= Guanare prison riot =

Venezuelan prison riot

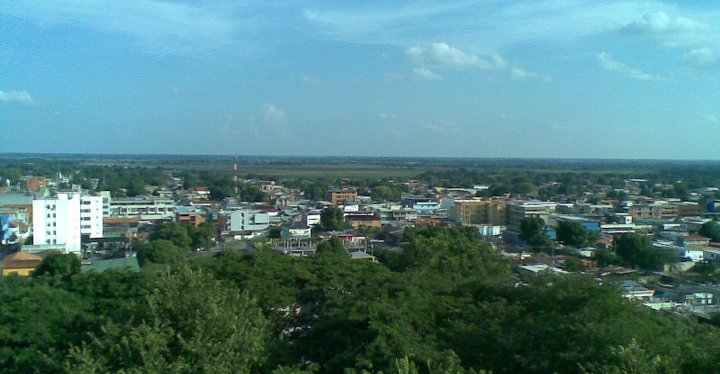
- Guanare in 2012
- Date: May 1, 2020
- Venue: Cepella
- Location: Guanare, Portuguesa, Venezuela
- Type: Riot
- Cause: Confiscation of food
- Deaths: 47
- Injuries: 75

The Guanare prison riot, also known as the Guanare massacre, occurred in the Los Llanos prison (known as Cepella) in Guanare, Portuguesa state, Venezuela, on 1 May 2020. The events caused around 47 deaths, and 75 people were injured.

== Background ==
According to the BBC, Venezuelan prisons saw an increase in riots during the COVID-19 pandemic. Prisons in the country experience overcrowding and unsanitary conditions, and many inmates rely on food and water brought to the prison for them. During the pandemic, visits were cut down and much of the food for prisoners was confiscated, leading to widespread hunger. The Guardian reported that the prison was designed to hold 750 inmates, but had over 2,500 at the time of the riot.

== Riot ==
According to families of the prisoners, the primary motive for the riot was hunger, with the inmates trying to reclaim food that had been kept by guards. A group of prisoners went to the gates to ask for their food after visiting time on 1 May, but the director of the prison and a military officer were there and a confrontation ensued; the officials then claimed there was an escape attempt and so prisoners were subdued.

The riot occurred in the administrative area of the prison and a section known as "Jumanji", where the prisoners catalogued as "los Manchados" – those imprisoned as pranatos (a modern Venezuelan judicial term indicating a dangerous life-sentence criminal, from an acronym for "born killer") – are held. Spokespersons for some of the prisoners gave testimonies to El Pitazo on 3 May, saying that there was no confrontation and that the National Guard initiated a massacre when a group of prisoners asked to be allowed through to get food. Families of prisoners added that they had also requested more flexibility with visiting times, which have been disrupted due to the COVID-19 pandemic.

=== Official motive theory ===
The Venezuelan NGO Una Ventana a la Libertad also reported on another theory, which suggests that the riot was started by "Olivo", an inmate prison gang leader, in response to the death of his second-in-command, who was killed by a group of various law enforcement and military officers in Biscucuy. According to the Minister for Prison Services, Iris Varela, the prisoners were forced by Olivo to start an escape attempt, and threatened by his gang at gunpoint. Varela said she would not confirm the number of deaths until more was known, and also claimed the prison director had been shot.

== Casualties ==
During the riot, at least 47 people were killed, and 75 injured. All of the deaths were prisoners.

The report from the Venezuelan Prison Observatory (OVP) indicated that at least 52 of the injured stayed in hospital overnight. The OVP also said that during the riot, the prison director Carlos Toro was injured by a stab wound to the back, and that a member of the Venezuelan National Guard (GNB) was injured by shrapnel from a grenade. A group with minor injuries were discharged and transferred back to prison before the morning.

== Aftermath ==
Information to the families of the prisoners was slow. One woman, identified as family of one of the prisoners in a video published by Una Ventana a la Libertad, said that the families were informed that they were going to be shown a list, but that they had been given no information or told if their relatives were alive.

The director of the OVP, Beatriz Carolina Girón, said that "the families [were] at the doors of the morgue to move the bodies, but the Guanare forensic scientist asked them for bleach and soap to clean the bodies and hand them over", and that "until now [the doctors] have not let [the families] see [the deceased], a relative told [Carolina Girón] that they identified them from photos shown on a computer".

The BBC said that, according to National Assembly deputy María Beatriz Martínez, families of the deceased have been informed that they will not receive their relatives' bodies, which will be buried in a mass grave instead.

=== Reactions ===
The UN High Commissioner for Human Rights, Michelle Bachelet, called for the government to investigate the deaths and to further guarantee basic rights for prisoners. The Inter-American Commission on Human Rights also spoke of their worries about the events, and asked for the Venezuelan authorities to investigate impartially to ultimately find those responsible.

Luis Almagro, Secretary General of the Organization of American States (OAS), referred to the massacre as "another unacceptable form of torture by the dictatorship [of Venezuela]". Amnesty International directly blamed Nicolás Maduro for the deaths, and for trying to "justify the violence used, stating that it was an attempted escape by persons deprived of liberty."

== See also ==
- 2018 Valencia fire
- Acarigua prison riot
