= La Modelo =

Prison in Colombia

Coordinates: 4°38′9.4734″N 74°6′27.8382″W

La Modelo (English: The Model [Prison]) is a prison in Bogotá, Colombia. With 15,000 inmates, the facility is known for its violence. Different areas of the prison are controlled by different factions of paramilitaries, guerrilla fighters, and drug cartels. Most of the prisoners at La Modelo are not associated with any factions. Prison guards do not carry weapons in the prison, except for a baton. However, guards in the watch towers do have a rifle. Prisoners have easy access to guns and grenades. The prison's administration allows prisoners to have businesses, such as bakeries or restaurants.

On 27 April 2000, over 100 prisoners were murdered in fighting. After the killings and the publicity it created the government began to change the prison regime. Many of the private shops were shut down and security was stepped up, although inmates still have access to arms.

== The battles of April 2000 ==
In mid-February 2000, visits to La Modelo were suspended. In March a peace pact was signed that was broken when the following April the dismembered corpse of paramilitary leader Carlos Alberto León, an inmate of patio two, was found.

While the Cuerpo Técnico de Investigación (CTI) were conducting their due diligence and removing the body, on Wednesday April 26, 2000, an armed confrontation between paramilitaries from the Autodefensas Unidas de Colombia (AUC) and common criminals from yards 3, 4 and 5 of the La Modelo prison left a total of 32 dead, 17 injured and 17 missing.. The battle lasted for 12 hours between Thursday afternoon and Friday morning, in a day that is the bloodiest experienced in any Colombian prison. In this incident, weapons, explosives, cartridges, communication elements, and AUC insignia were seized, among other elements.

The battle started at 14:40, when members of the self-defense groups of yards 3 and 5 learned of the shooting death of Yema Ospina Flórez, a relative of one of the members of "Los Priscos", a criminal gang from the time of Pablo Escobar, leader of the Cartel de Medellín who disappeared in 1993. Ospina had been infiltrated by the paramilitaries in yard 4, so that he would report who the bosses were in that yard. Most of the inmates in this yard were accused of social crimes (kidnapping, rape and theft, among others).

Approximately 800 men under the command of Jhon Jairo Velásquez, alias "Popeye", former lieutenant of Pablo Escobar. When Popeye's men found out about Ospina's intention, they executed him. The event triggered the operation led by the paramilitary chief of patio 5 known as Cadavid. Faced with the impotence of the prison guards and knocking down walls and bars with the use of grenades, the paramilitaries entered yard 4. Wearing black armbands and the initials AUC, they demanded that Popeye's protégés surrender. Only 42 did, those who refused were shot.

The National Police of Colombia, who had not entered the prison for 15 years, decided to take it at dawn the following Saturday. An arsenal was seized that included four kilos of high-powered explosive and seven charges of dynamite. However, 4 days later, guards from Instituto Nacional Penitenciario y Carcelario (INPEC) entered a yard in the prison and captured a sub-machine pistol Ingram MAC-10 plus a pistol capable of tricking the X rays, amongst other weapons. Pistols and hand grenades were also found, wrapped in plastic bags and hidden in the walls or buried.

Additionally, 17 inmates held in patio 4 were declared missing. According to the Committee for Solidarity with Political Prisoners, there were indications that the prisoners used tunnels and sewers to hide the bodies of the disappeared. However, both INPEC and the Cuerpo Técnico de Investigación (CTI) of the prosecution service and the police denied the existence of such graves.

Most of the victims were wounded with a firearm and some with a knife. Their ages range from 23 to 43 years old.

== Other incidents ==
In 2016, the dismembered remains of at least 100 prisoners and visitors were found in drain pipes at the jail.

On 21 March 2020, at least 23 prisoners were killed and 83 injured during a riot which erupted amid fears over the spread of SARS-CoV-2 in the prison during the COVID-19 pandemic. Prisoners across the country were protesting against overcrowding and poor health services since the outbreak of COVID-19.

On 16 May 2024, Elmer Fernandez, the prison's director who had been in office since 4 April, was shot dead by a motorcycle gunman while he was returning home from work in Bogota.

== See also ==
- Tuluá prison riot
