= Yare Prison =

Prison complex in San Francisco de Yare, Miranda State, Venezuela

Coordinates: 10.18029°N 66.74231°W

Yare Prison (Spanish: Prisión de Yare; officially: Prison of San Francisco de Yare) is a prison in San Francisco de Yare, in the Simón Bolívar Municipality of the Miranda state, Venezuela. Like other prisons in Venezuela, it is known for its harsh conditions, mainly due to overcrowding and poor facilities. Nationally, some 44,500 prisoners are housed in buildings designed for 15,000.

There are three groups of buildings: Yare I, II, and III. These centers are overpopulated. Yare I was designed to have 750 prisoners, but currently houses approximately 1,153. Yare I was built in 1984, and Yare II was constructed between 1997 and 1998. Military personnel involved in the coup of February 1992 against President Carlos Andrés Pérez were imprisoned here from 1992 until 1994, until President Rafael Caldera's pardon. While imprisoned here, Hugo Chávez, leader of the coup, wrote his political manifesto "Cómo salir del laberinto".

== 2012 Riot ==
On the 20th of August, 2012, a clash between two gangs in Yare I caused 25 deaths and 43 wounded. The cause of the brawl was a gun discharged during a discussion between the gang leaders. However, the shot did not hit anyone.

== See also ==
- Yare prison riot
