= Humberto Prado =

Venezuelan lawyer and activist

Humberto Prado is a Venezuelan lawyer and activist. He is the founder and served as director of the Venezuelan Observatory of Prisons (OVP). In 2019, during the presidential crisis in Venezuela, he was appointed by Juan Guaidó as Presidential Commissioner for Human Rights.

== Venezuelan Prison Observatory ==
In September 2002, Humberto founded the Venezuelan Prison Observatory together with a team and with family savings, an organization dedicated to assisting people deprived of liberty and documenting cases of human rights violations within prison facilities. On several occasions Prado has requested precautionary measures before the Inter-American Commission on Human Rights (IACHR) to preserve the fundamental rights of the prison population.

In 2009 he received the human rights award given by the Canadian embassy for his work as a defender of the rights of those deprived of liberty in Venezuela, as well as for his research work in the search for knowledge of prison systems around the world.

== Presidential commissioner ==
On August 28, 2019, during the Venezuelan presidential crisis, he was appointed as presidential commissioner for human rights by the president in charge Juan Guaidó.
