= Observatorio Venezolano de Prisiones =

Venezuelan non-governmental organisation

The Observatorio Venezolano de Prisiones (OVP, in English Venezuelan Observatory of Prisons) is a Venezuelan NGO working to improve human rights for prisoners. Its offices are located in Caracas.

== History ==
The OVP was founded in 2002. Among its members there are political scientists, criminologists, sociologists, architects and experts in the prison system.

The organisation was very vocal when in 2014 when 34 inmates at the Uribana prison died during protests. This was in the wake of the 2013 Uribana prison riot in which over 60 prisoners died.

The IACHR expressed concerns after government official Diosdado Cabello informed on his TV program Hitting with the Hammer when several representatives of the OVP were arriving in Venezuela after an international tour. The IACH considered Cabello was threatening them by notifying what were private details of a trip.
