= Altamira prison brawl =

2012 prison riot in Altamira, Mexico

- Part of Mexican drug war
- Location: 22°20′N 97°52′W
- Date: 4 January 2012
- Target: Gulf Cartel
- Attack type: Mass murder
- Deaths: 31
- Injuries: 13
- Perpetrator: Los Zetas
- Motive: Gang rivalry

The Altamira prison brawl was a deadly fight that occurred on 4 January 2012 in Altamira, Tamaulipas, Mexico. Officials from the state of Tamaulipas confirmed that 31 people were killed, with another thirteen injured. The fight started after a drug gang burst into a section of the prison where they were banned from, attacking their rival gang housed there, triggering the fight. During the altercation, the inmates used several kinds of cold weapons (non-firearms) to kill their opponents. The prisoners also used sticks and knives to massacre the members of the rival gang.

Alejandro Poiré Romero, Mexico's Secretary of the Interior, pledged to work with the state of Tamaulipas. In addition, the United Nations condemned the massacre and asked for the National Human Rights Commission to "monitor conditions of detention throughout Mexico."

== Causes ==
The state government of Tamaulipas reported that a group of inmates entered a prohibited area inside the prison and attacked the members of their rival gang. Local media indicated that the brawl was between the Gulf Cartel and Los Zetas, two drug cartels that fight for territory in the northeastern part of Mexico. La Jornada newspaper, in addition, said that prison in Altamira had the capacity to house 2,000 prisoners, but actually had more than 3,000.

== Past incidents ==
=== Prison killings ===
On 15 October 2011, in the border city of Matamoros, Tamaulipas, 20 inmates were killed and 12 were severely wounded in a prison brawl. Some sources revealed that the killings were "planned executions." Earlier on 6 August 2010, 14 inmates were also killed in a riot at the federal prison in Matamoros. Moreover, in 1991, the time when Juan García Ábrego was the supreme leader of the Gulf Cartel, the federal prison in Matamoros experienced the massacre of 18 people. In the nearby border city of Reynosa, Tamaulipas, 21 inmates were killed after a shooting inside the prison on 20 October 2008.

On 26 July 2011 in Ciudad Juárez, Chihuahua, a prison brawl left 17 inmates dead and 4 injured after "one group of inmates attacked rivals from another drug gang." Some of the corpses were shot with assault rifles, and authorities investigates whether the weapons used in the attack were "stolen from prison guards, homemade or smuggled" inside the prison. Surveillance videos show how two gangs of the Sinaloa Cartel and the Juárez Cartel stormed the prison with assault rifles.

On 19 February 2012, in the city of Apodaca, Nuevo León, 44 were killed and 12 were injured in a prison riot; the brawl was, according to local authorities, between the Gulf Cartel and Los Zetas, their former allies. In the state of Durango, 19 inmates were killed in the prison of Gómez Palacio on 25 August 2009; in the same prison on 21 January 2010, about 23 inmates were killed in a brawl. On 19 May 2011, a shooting inside a prison in Durango left 8 prisoners dead, and on 15 November 2010 a group of gunmen threw a grenade inside the prison. In Tijuana, Baja California on 18 September 2008, nearly 19 inmates were killed in a brawl between rival drug cartel members.

In Mazatlán, Sinaloa on 14 June 2010, a group of gunmen entered a prison, killed the guard, then entered a cell and massacred 29 people.

== See also ==
- 2011–12 in the Mexican drug war
- Apodaca prison riot
- Mexican drug war
- Timeline of the Mexican drug war
