= Cieneguillas, Zacatecas =

Town in Zacatecas, Mexico

Coordinates: 22.757°N 102.664°W

Cieneguillas is a town in the Mexican state of Zacatecas. It is located in the state's centre and lies within the municipality of Zacatecas. The city has 2,200 inhabitants, which makes it the second most populous settlement in the municipality, after the municipal seat and state capital, the city of Zacatecas, within whose more lavish urban confines Cieneguillas lies.

== Prison riots ==
Prison riots occurred in Cieneguillas in 2019 and 2020.
