= 2013 Uribana prison riot =

2013 deadly prison riot in Barquisimeto, Venezuela

- Location: Uribana prison, Barquisimeto, Venezuela
- Date: 25–26 January 2013
- Target: Venezuelan National Guard members
- Deaths: 61
- Injuries: 120

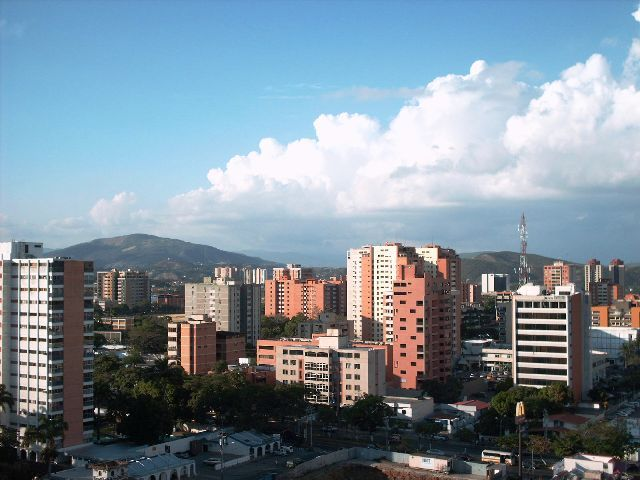
Buildings in Barquisimeto

On 25 January 2013, a riot began at Uribana prison in Barquisimeto, Venezuela. Initial reports gave at least 50 people killed and over 120 people injured, and by 27 January a death toll of 61 was reported. Officials on the first day of the riot faulted media for breaking news in advance that the prison would be searched by the military. As the riot continued into a second day, human rights groups faulted overcrowding and conditions in the gang-dominated prison.

== Outbreak ==
The riot was reportedly triggered by an announcement that, in an anti-gang measure, Venezuelan National Guard troops would be searching for weapons. The inmates were reportedly waiting for the National Guard when they arrived. Most injuries were from gunshot wounds. Bodies have been described as unidentifiable due to their mutilation. Due to the mutilation, officials were charged for a violation of human rights.

== Response ==
In a press statement on the first day of the riot, minister of penitentiary services Iris Varela laid blame on the local media for reporting the prison search ahead of time, stating that many of the deaths were a "settling of scores" among rival prison gangs. Human rights groups blamed overcrowding and inhumane conditions, as well as poor execution and unnecessary force. Unnamed critics of the government noted that the Inter-American Court of Human Rights had called on president Hugo Chávez in 2007 to relieve conditions there that put visitors, inmates, and guards at risk. The inmates were temporarily removed as a result of two days of rioting.

== See also ==
- Yare prison riot
- Carandiru massacre
