= Topo Chico (prison) =

Prison located in Monterrey, northern Mexico

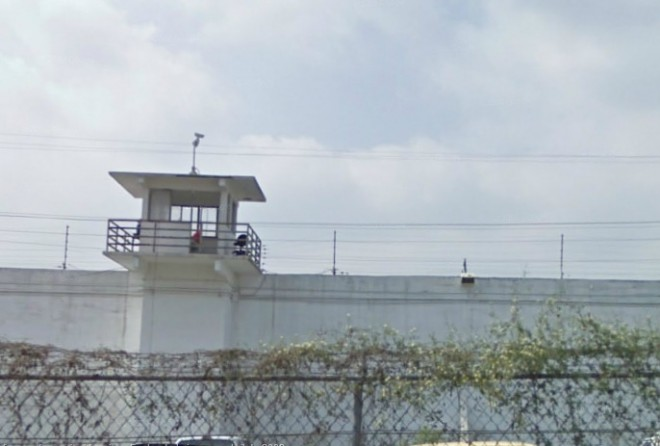
- Interactive map of Topo Chico
- Location: Monterrey, Nuevo León, Mexico; 25°43′30″N 100°20′41″W
- Status: closed
- Capacity: 3,685
- Population: 4,091 (September 2015)
- Managed by: Secretariat of Public Security
- Director: Gregoria Salazar Robles

Notable prisoners
- Jorge Lankenau

Topo Chico was a prison located in Monterrey, northern Mexico, close to Penitenciaría (Spanish for 'penitentiary') metro station.

The prison is an establishment of the Federal Government of Mexico and is administered by the Secretariat of Public Security (Spanish: Secretaría de Seguridad Pública, SSP). The director of the prison is Gregoria Salazar Robles, appointed 12 March 2012.

As of September 2015 the prison was overcrowded with a capacity for 3,685 inmates but a population of 4,091. The infrastructure in poor condition with generally no water, light or ventilation in the cells according to a 2014 report by United Nations Special Rapporteur Juan E. Méndez.

== Incidents ==
In 2011 police found the dismembered body of prison security chief Francisco Martinez Ramirez in a plastic box inside a car abandoned near Topo Chico.

On 21 February 2012, 3 inmates were stabbed to death in targeted attacks at the prison.

On 11 February 2016, 49 inmates were killed and 12 injured following a fight between two rival gangs at Topo Chico in which inmates set fires affecting two of the prison's units. Governor of Nuevo León state Jaime Rodríguez Calderón told journalists that one of the factions involved in the violence was led by a leader of the Zetas Cartel, and the leader of the other group was identified by Mexican media as a leader of the Gulf Cartel.
