= List of French forts in North America =

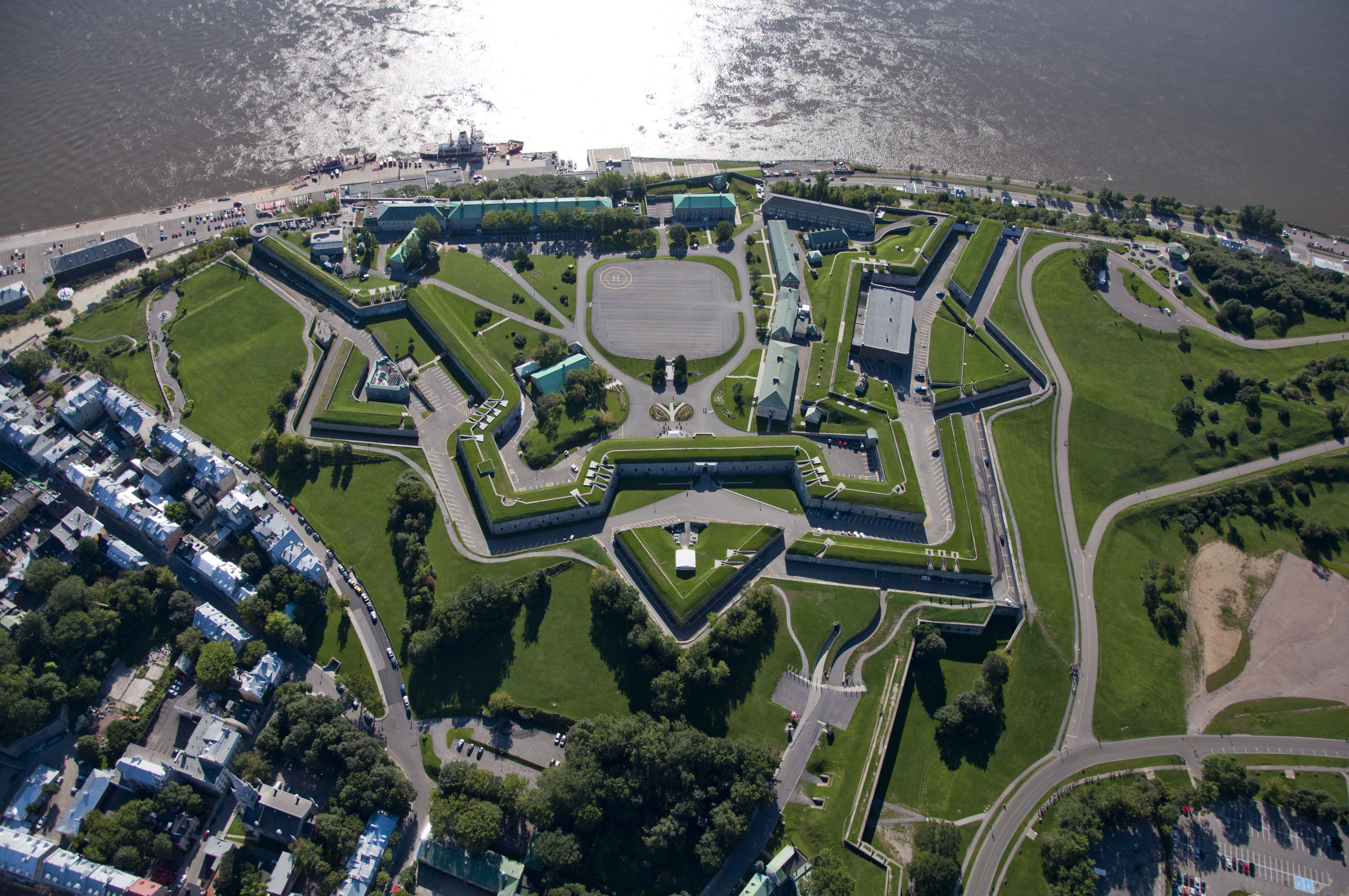
The Citadelle of Quebec is a National Historic Site of Canada, and also forms part of the Fortifications of Québec National Historic Site of Canada. The fortress is located within the "Historic District of Old Québec", which was designated a World Heritage Site in 1985.

This is a list of forts in New France built by the French government or French chartered companies in what later became Canada, Saint Pierre and Miquelon, and the United States. They range from large European-type citadels like at Quebec City to tiny fur-trade posts.

Predominant French colonial trading companies operating in North America included, Company of One Hundred Associates, Company of Habitants and French West India Company. See also, French Canadian North West Company.

== Canada ==
The French forts in Canada were located from the Atlantic Ocean to as far west as the confluence of the North and South Saskatchewan rivers, and as far north as James Bay. Built between the 1640s and the 1750s, a few were captured from rival British fur trading companies like Hudson's Bay Company. The forts were located on waterways to provide transport of fur back east to Montreal or Quebec City. A few have survived or been re-built, but most are ruins or simply disappeared after abandonment.

Name	Date constructed c.	Location	Province	Image
Fort Anne	1636	Annapolis Royal	Nova Scotia	
Fort Anticosti	1681	Anticosti Island	Quebec	
Fort Bas de la Rivière	1750	Fort Alexander	Manitoba	
Fort Boishébert	1749	Grand Bay	New Brunswick	
Fort Beauséjour	1751	Aulac	New Brunswick	
Fort Bourbon (West)	1741	Grand Rapids	Manitoba	
Fort Bourbon (North)	1697	York Factory	Manitoba	
Camp d'ésperance	1756	Beaubears Island	New Brunswick	
Fort Charlesbourg Royal	1541–1543	Quebec City	Quebec	
Fort Chambly	1665	Chambly	Quebec	
Citadelle of Quebec	1693	Quebec City	Quebec	
Citadelle of Montreal	1690–1821	Montreal	Quebec	
Fort Dauphin	1741	Winnipegosis	Manitoba	
Fort de l'Isle aux Noix	1759	Île aux Noix	Quebec	
Fort de la Corne	1753	Fort à la Corne Provincial Forest	Saskatchewan	
Fort de la Montagne	1685	Montreal	Quebec	
Fort Douville	1720	Toronto	Ontario	
Fort Dumoine	1730	Rapides-des-Joachims	Quebec	
Fort du Moulin	1749	Trois-Rivières	Quebec	
Fort du Sault Saint-Louis	1725	Kahnawake	Quebec	
Fort Esquimaux Baie	1743	North West River	Newfoundland and Labrador	
Fort Fronsec	1648	Miramichi	New Brunswick	
Fort Frontenac	1673	Kingston	Ontario	
Fort Gaspareaux	1751	Strait Shores	New Brunswick	
Fort Jemseg	1659	Jemseg	New Brunswick	
Fort Jacques-Cartier	1759	Cap-Santé	Quebec	
Fort Kaministiquia	1717	Thunder Bay	Ontario	
Fort Lachine	1669–1695	Montréal	Quebec	
Fort Laprairie	1687	La Prairie	Quebec	
Fort La Reine	1738	Portage la Prairie	Manitoba	
Fort La Jonquière	1751	Saskatchewan River Forks (near Prince Albert)	Saskatchewan	
Fort Longueuil	1690	Longueuil	Quebec	
Fort La Tour	1631	Saint John	New Brunswick	
Fortress of Louisbourg	1719	Louisbourg	Nova Scotia	
Fort Maurepas (Red River)	1733	Selkirk	Manitoba	
Fort Maurepas (Winnipeg River)	1739	Powerview-Pine Falls	Manitoba	
Fort Menagoueche	1751	Saint John	New Brunswick	
Fort Nashwaak	1691–1692	Fredericton	New Brunswick	
Fort Paskoya	1741	The Pas (on Cedar Lake)	Manitoba	
Fort Plaisance	1662	Placentia	Newfoundland and Labrador	
Fort Pointe-aux-Trembles	1670	Montréal	Quebec	
Fort Pontchartrain	1704	Blanc-Sablon	Quebec	
Port-Royal Habitation	1605	Annapolis Royal	Nova Scotia	
Habitation Of Quebec	1608	Quebec City	Quebec	
Fort Richelieu	1641	Sorel-Tracy	Quebec	
Fort Richibouctou	1682	Richibucto	New Brunswick	
Fort Rouge	1738	Winnipeg	Manitoba	
Fort Rouillé	1750	Toronto	Ontario	
Fort Royal (Newfoundland)	1687	Placentia	Newfoundland and Labrador	
Fort Sainte Anne (Hudson Bay)	1670 (1686)	Fort Albany	Ontario	
Fort Sainte Anne	1629–1641	Englishtown	Nova Scotia	
Fort Saint-François	1660	Trois-Rivières	Quebec	
Fort Saint Jacques	1686–1693 and 1697–1713	Waskaganish	Quebec	
Fort Saint-Jean	c1748	Saint-Jean-sur-Richelieu	Quebec	Fort Saint-Jean c1748
Fort Saint Louis (Newfoundland)	1690–1713	Placentia	Newfoundland and Labrador	
Fort Saint Louis (Guysborough)	1634–1683	Guysborough	Nova Scotia	
Fort St. Louis	1620–1834	Quebec City	Quebec	
Fort St. Louis (Shelburne)	1623–1930	Cape Sable Island	Nova Scotia	
Fort Ste. Marie (Ontario)	1639	Midland	Ontario	
Fort Ste. Marie (Nova Scotia)	1632	LaHave	Nova Scotia	
Fort St. Louis	1670s (1686)	Moose Factory	Ontario	
Fort St. Pierre (St. Peter's)	1630	St. Peter's	Nova Scotia	
Fort St. Pierre	1731	Fort Frances (near mouth of the Rainy River meets with Rainy Lake)	Ontario	
Fort Sainte Thérèse	1665	Carignan	Quebec	
Fort Senneville	1671	Montreal	Quebec	
Fort Shédiac	1671	Shediac	New Brunswick	
Fort Témiscamingue	1679	Ville-Marie	Quebec	
Tadoussac Trading Post	1600	Tadoussac	Quebec	
Fort Toronto	1750	Toronto	Ontario	
Fort Tourette	1683	Lake Nipigon	Ontario	
Fort Trois-Rivières	1634–1638	Trois-Rivières	Quebec	
Fort Ville-Marie	1642–1688	Montreal	Quebec	
Port-la-Joye	1720	Charlottetown	Prince Edward Island	

== Saint Pierre and Miquelon ==
Name	Date constructed c.	Location	Communes of France	Image
Pointe aux Cannon Battery	1690	Saint Pierre Island	Saint-Pierre	

== United States ==
The French forts built in what is now the United States, were part of a series of forts built from the Great Lakes to the Mississippi delta; as far west as Kansas, as far east as Maine.

Name	Date constructed c.	Location	State	Image
Arkansas Post	1686	Arkansas County	Arkansas	
Fort des Alibamons	1717	Wetumpka	Alabama	
Fort Assumption	1739	Memphis	Tennessee	
Fort de la Balise	1722	Plaquemines Parish	Louisiana	
Fort Beauharnois	1727	Goodhue County	Minnesota	
Fort De La Boulaye (Fort Bayougoula, Fort Iberville, Fort Louisiana)	1700	Phoenix, Plaquemines Parish	Louisiana	
Fort de Buade	1683	St. Ignace	Michigan	
Fort Carillon	1754–57	Ticonderoga	New York	
Fort Caroline	1564	Jacksonville	Florida	
Fort de Cavagnal	1744	Missouri River between Kansas City and Fort Leavenworth	Kansas	
Fort Charles	1562	Beaufort	South Carolina	
Fort de Chartres	1720	Randolph County	Illinois	
Fort Condé de la Mobille	1723	Mobile	Alabama	
Fort Conti	1679	Youngstown	New York	
Fort Crèvecoeur	1680	Creve Coeur	Illinois	
Fort Denonville	1687	Youngstown	New York	
Fort Ponchartrain du Détroit	1701	Detroit	Michigan	
Fort Détour à l'Anglais	1722	Belle Chase	Louisiana	
Fort Duquesne	1750	Morrison County	Minnesota	
Fort Duquesne	1754	Pittsburgh	Pennsylvania	
Fort Dubreuil (Côte des Allemands)	1740	Destrehan	Louisiana	
Fort St. Jean	1708	New Orleans	Louisiana	
Fort Kaskaskia	1759	Kaskaskia	Illinois	
Fort de La Présentation	1671	Ogdensburg	New York	
Fort Le Boeuf	1753	Waterford	Pennsylvania	
Fort Lévis	1759	Ogdensburg	New York	
Fort Louis de la Louisiane	1702	Le Moyne	Alabama	
Fort Machault	1754	Franklin	Pennsylvania	
Fort Massac	1757	Massac County	Illinois	
Fort Maurepas	1699	Ocean Springs	Mississippi	
Fort Miami (Indiana)	1715	Fort Wayne	Indiana	
Fort Miami (Michigan)	1679	St. Joseph	Michigan	
Fort Michilimackinac	1715	Mackinaw City	Michigan	
Fort des Natchitoches	1714	Natchitoches	Louisiana	
Fort Niagara	1678	Youngstown	New York	
Fort Orleans	1723	Brunswick	Missouri	
Fort Ouiatenon	1717	West Lafayette	Indiana	
Fort Pentagouet	1638	Castine	Maine	
Fort St. Philip	1761	Buras-Triumph	Louisiana	
Fort Pimiteoui	1691	Peoria	Illinois	
Fort Pointe-à-la-Chevelure	1731	Chimney Point	Vermont	
Fort Presque Isle	1753	Erie	Pennsylvania	
Fort Prudhomme	1682	Memphis	Tennessee	
Fort Rosalie	1716	Natchez	Mississippi	
Fort Ste. Anne	1666	Isle La Motte	Vermont	
Fort St. Charles	1732	Lake of the Woods County	Minnesota	
Habitation Of St. Croix	1604	Saint Croix Island	Maine	
Fort St. Frédéric	1729–1757	Crown Point	New York	
Fort St. Joseph	1691	Niles	Michigan	
Fort St. Leon	1749	Belle Chase	Louisiana	
Fort Saint Louis	1685	Inez	Texas	
Fort St. Louis-Le Rocher	1682	North Utica	Illinois	
Fort St. Marie	1746	English Turn	Louisiana	
Fort St. Saveur	1613	Mount Desert Island	Maine	
Fort Sandoské	1745	Sandusky Bay	Ohio	
Fort de Tombecbé	1735–37	Epes	Alabama	
Fort Toulouse	1717	Wetumpka	Alabama	
Fort Vincennes	1731–32	Vincennes	Indiana	

== See also ==
- Military of New France
- List of Hudson's Bay Company trading posts
- List of North American cities by year of foundation

Canada related

- Canadian Forces base
- Former colonies and territories in Canada
- List of Royal Canadian Air Force stations
- List of Royal Canadian Navy stations

United States related

- List of United States Army installations
- List of United States Army airfields
- List of United States military bases
- List of United States Navy installations
- List of United States Marine Corps installations
- List of United States Air Force installations
