= List of battles with most German military fatalities =

This article contains a list of battles and military campaigns with most German military deaths.

== Introduction ==
This article lists battles and campaigns in which the number of German military fatalities exceed 1,000. The term casualty in warfare refers to a soldier who is no longer fit to fight being in combat. Casualties can include killed, wounded, missing, captured or deserted.

In this article the numbers of killed refer to those killed in action, killed by disease, missing presumed dead, or someone who died from their wounds.

== Battles ==
Battle or siege	Conflict	Date	Estimated number killed	Opposing force	References
Battle of Verdun	World War I	February 21 to December 18, 1916	143,000 killed (Note: Estimates range from 71,000 to 143,000 killed)	France	
Battle of Berlin	World War II	April 16 to May 2, 1945	100,000 killed (Note: Estimates range from 92,000 to 100,000 killed and are based on incomplete archival data. These figures do not include the 125,000 German civilians who were also killed during the battle.)	Soviet Union; Poland	
Battle of Smolensk (1941)	World War II	July 8 to September 10, 1941	~29,650 killed (Note: Between July 21 and September 10 only)	Soviet Union	
First Battle of Kiev	World War II	July 7 to September 26, 1941	26,856 killed	Soviet Union	
Battle of Łódź	World War I	November 11 to December 6, 1914	25,818 killed (Note: Per German medical data)	Russia	
Battle of the Ardennes	World War I	August 21 to 23, 1914	15,000 killed	France	
Battle of Monte Cassino	World War II	January 17 to May 18, 1944	~15,000 killed	United Kingdom; British Raj (Dominion of Newfoundland) Newfoundland; United States; Free France (Polish government-in-exile) Poland; Canada (Dominion of New Zealand) New Zealand (Union of South Africa) South Africa (Kingdom of Italy) Italy	
Siege of Breslau	World War II	February 15 to May 6, 1945	13,000 killed (Note: Estimates range from 5,700 to 13,000)	Soviet Union	
Battle of the Seelow Heights (part of the Battle of Berlin)	World War II	April 16 to 19, 1945	12,000 killed	Soviet Union; Poland	
Battle of Lyuban	World War II	January 7 to April 30, 1942	11,642 killed	Soviet Union	
Falaise pocket	World War II	August 12 to 21, 1944	10,000 killed (Note: While estimates range from 10,000 to 15,000 killed, 10,000 is the most widely cited number)	United States; United Kingdom; Canada; Poland; France	
Battle of the Bzura	World War II	September 9 to 19, 1939	8,000 killed	Poland	
Battle of Gravelotte	Franco-Prussian War	August 18, 1870	5,237 killed	France	
Battle of Bautzen (Note: Also known as the Battle of Budziszyn)	World War II	April 21 to 30, 1945	5,000 killed	Soviet Union; Poland	
Battle of Humin-Bolimów	World War I	January 14 to February 28, 1915	4,631 killed	Russia	
Battle of Uman	World War II	July 15 to August 8, 1941	~4,610 killed (Note: Estimated losses of the 17th Army and 1st Panzer Army between July 20 and August 10, 1941 only). The 17th Army also included a brigade sized Slovakian "mobile command" from the Slovak Expeditionary Army Group)	Soviet Union	
Third Battle of Kharkov	World War II	February 19 to March 15, 1943	4,500 killed	Soviet Union; Czechoslovakia	
Battle of Mars-la-Tour	Franco-Prussian War	August 16, 1870	4,421 killed	France	
Siege of Sevastopol	World War II	October 30, 1941 to July 4, 1942	4,264 killed	Soviet Union	
Battle of the Mons pocket	World War II	August 31 to September 5, 1944	3,500 killed	United States; Belgium	
Battle of Gdynia	World War II	September 1 to 14, 1939	~3,000 killed	Poland	
Second Battle of Kiev	World War II	November 3 to December 22, 1943	2,628 killed	Soviet Union; Czechoslovakia	
Liberation of Strasbourg	World War II	November 23, 1944	Over 2,000 killed (Note: Between November 18 and 23.)	France; United States	
Battle of Saint-Mihiel	World War I	September 12 to 16, 1918	2,000 killed	United States; France	
Battle of Tannenberg	World War I	August 23 to 30, 1914	Over 1,726 killed (Note: Between August 21 and 30)	Russia	
Battle of Kissingen	Austro-Prussian War	July 10, 1866	1,589 killed	(Kingdom of Bavaria) Bavaria (Note: Bavaria was aligned with the Austrian-led part of the German Confederation states during the war)	
Battle of Wörth	Franco-Prussian War	August 6, 1870	1,586 killed (Note: 103 officers and 1,483 soldiers)	France	
Battle of Leuthen	Third Silesian War and the Seven Years' War	December 5, 1757	1,141 killed	(Austrian Empire) Austria	
Battle of Crete (Note: Also known as Operation Mercury)	World War II	May 20 to June 1, 1941	1,353 killed (Note: 1,032 paratroopers and Luftwaffe aircrew and 321 from the 5th Mountain Division)	United Kingdom; Australia; New Zealand (Kingdom of Greece) Greece	
Battle of Sedan	Franco-Prussian War	September 1 to 2, 1870	1,310 killed	France	
Battle of Borny–Colombey	Franco-Prussian War	August 14, 1870	1,189 killed	France	
Battle of Rostov	World War II	November 17 to December 2, 1941	Over 1,141 killed (Note: Per incomplete German German medical data between November 11 and November 30 which also excludes non-combat casualties)	Soviet Union	
Opération Vésuve (Note: Also known as the Liberation of Corsica)	World War II	September 8 to October 4, 1943	1,000 killed	(Kingdom of Italy) Italy; Free France; United Kingdom; United States	
Royan pocket	World War II	September 12, 1944 to April 20, 1945	~1,000 killed	France; United States	

== Campaigns ==
Campaign	Conflict	Date	Estimated number killed	Opposing force	References
Operation Bagration	World War II	June 22 to August 19, 1944	~381,000 killed (Note: Estimates range from 26,397 killed to around 381,000 killed)	Soviet Union; Poland (Free France) France	
Vistula–Oder offensive	World War II	January 12 to February 2, 1945	295,000 killed	Soviet Union; Poland	
Operation Barbarossa	World War II	June 22 to December 5, 1941	186,452 killed	Soviet Union	
Battle of the Dnieper	World War II	August 26 to December 23, 1943	102,000 killed	Soviet Union	
Hundred Days Offensive	World War I	August 8 to November 11, 1918	Over 100,000 killed	France; United Kingdom; Canada (Australia) Australia New Zealand (Dominion of Newfoundland) Newfoundland; South Africa; United States; Belgium (Kingdom of Italy) Italy; Portugal (Thailand) Siam	
Bobruysk offensive (part of Operation Bagration)	World War II	June 23 to 28, 1944	50,000 killed	Soviet Union	
Polotsk offensive (part of Operation Bagration)	World War II	June 29 to July 4, 1944	37,000 killed	Soviet Union	
Battle of Moscow (Note: Also known as Operation Typhoon)	World War II	October 2, 1941 to January 7, 1942	Over 35,757 killed (Note: The figure per official Wehrmacht daily casualty for the Battle of Moscow was 35,757 killed, 128,716 wounded, and 9,721 missing between 1 October 1941 and 10 January 1942. However, the data from the official report does not match unofficial reports from individual battalion and divisional officers and commanders at the front, who record suffering far higher casualties than was officially reported.)	Soviet Union	
Vilno-Dvinsk offensive	World War I	August 29 to November 30, 1915	33,337 killed	Russia	
Mogilev offensive (part of Operation Bagration)	World War II	June 23 to 28, 1944	33,000 killed	Soviet Union	
Belostok offensive (part of Operation Bagration)	World War II	July 5 to 27, 1944	30,000 killed	Soviet Union	
Meuse–Argonne offensive (part of the Hundred Days Offensive)	World War I	September 26 to November 11, 1918	28,000 killed	United States; France (Rattanakosin Kingdom (1782–1932)) Siam	
Battle of France	World War II	May 10 to June 25, 1940	27,074 killed	(French Third Republic) France; French Algeria (French protectorate in Morocco) French Morocco (French protectorate of Tunisia) French Tunisia; French West Africa; French Madagascar; French Indochina; Belgium; United Kingdom; Netherlands; Poland; Canada (Czechoslovak government-in-exile) Czechoslovakia; Luxembourg	
Battle of the Bulge	World War II	December 16, 1944 to January 28, 1945	24,000 killed (Note: Estimates range from 10,749 killed to 24,000 killed.)	United States; United Kingdom; Canada; France; Belgium	
Rogachev–Zhlobin offensive	World War II	February 21 to 26, 1944	24,000 killed (Note: Estimates range from 4,000 to 24,000 killed.)	Soviet Union	
Defence of the Reich	World War II	September 4, 1939 to May 8, 1945	At least 23,000 killed (Note: Including both soldiers and policemen. This figure does not include the 500,000 civilians who were also killed)	United States; United Kingdom; Canada; Soviet Union; France; Belgium; Netherlands; Norway (Second Polish Republic) Poland; Czechoslovakia	
North African campaign	World War II	June 11, 1940 to May 13, 1943	18,594 killed	United Kingdom (British Raj) India (Dominion of Newfoundland) Newfoundland; Free France; Australia; New Zealand (Union of South Africa) South Africa; United States (Polish government-in-exile) Poland (Greek government-in-exile) Greece (Czechoslovak government-in-exile) Czechoslovakia	
Lvov-Sandomierz Offensive	World War II	July 13 to August 29, 1944	16,438 killed (Note: Between July 11 and August 31 citing casualty reports of Army Group North Ukraine)	Soviet Union	
Invasion of Poland	World War II	September 1 to October 6, 1939	16,343 killed (Note: Modern estimates range from 8,082 to 16,343 German KIA)	(Second Polish Republic) Poland	
Belgrade offensive	World War II	September 15 to November 24, 1944	15,000 killed	Soviet Union (Yugoslav Partisans) Yugoslavia; Bulgaria	
East African campaign	World War I	August 3, 1914 to November 25, 1918	9,029 killed (Note: 100 officers, 639 German soldiers, 1,290 Askari and 7,000 porters)	United Kingdom (Union of South Africa) South Africa (British Raj) British Raj Rhodesia; East Africa Protectorate; Nyasaland; Uganda; Nigeria; Belgium; Belgian Congo (First Portuguese Republic) Portugal; Portuguese Mozambique	
Carpathian Campaign	World War I	January 14 to April 24, 1915	5,687 killed (Note: 148 officers and 5,539 soldiers killed)	Russia	
Baltic operation (Part of Operation Barbarossa)	World War II	June 22 to July 9, 1941	4,878 killed	Soviet Union	
Odessa Offensive	World War II	March 26 to April 30, 1944	~4,672 killed (Note: 6th Army in April 1944 only.)	Soviet Union	
Allied invasion of Sicily	World War II	July 9 to August 17, 1943	4,325 killed	United Kingdom; United States; Canada	
Melitopol offensive	World War II	September 26 to November 5, 1943	~4,077 killed (Note: 6th Army only between September 20th and November 10th, 1943)	Soviet Union	
Norwegian campaign	World War II	April 8 to June 10, 1940	3,692 killed (Note: 1,317 killed on land and 2,375 died at sea.)	Norway; United Kingdom (French Third Republic) France; Poland	
Donbas–Rostov strategic defensive operation (Part of Operation Barbarossa)	World War II	September 29 to November 16, 1941	3,454 killed	Soviet Union	

== See also ==
- List of battles with most French military fatalities
- List of battles with most Italian military fatalities
- List of battles with most United States military fatalities
- List of battles with most Canadian military fatalities

== Bibliography ==
- Carell, Paul (1960). Le volpi del deserto. 1941–1943: le armate italo-tedesche in Africa settentrionale [The wolves of the desert. 1941–1943: the Italo-German armies in North Africa]. New York: Bantam.
- Frieser, Karl-Heinz; Schmider, Klaus; Schönherr, Klaus; Schreiber, Gerhard; Ungváry, Kristián; Wegner, Bernd (2007). Das Deutsche Reich und der Zweite Weltkrieg: Die Ostfront 1943/44 – Der Krieg im Osten und an den Nebenfronten [Germany and the Second World War: The Eastern Front 1943/44 - The War in the East and on the Neighbouring Fronts] (in German). Vol. VIII. München: Deutsche Verlags-Anstalt. ISBN 978-3421062352.
- Glantz, David (2001). The Siege of Leningrad 1941–44: 900 Days of Terror. Zenith Press, Osceola, WI. ISBN 0-7603-0941-8.
- Glantz, David; Orenstein, Harold S. (2004). Belorussia 1944. Routledge. ISBN 978-0-203-30920-9.
- Krivosheev, G. F. (1997). Soviet Casualties and Combat Losses in the Twentieth Century. London: Greenhill Books. ISBN 1853672807.
- Müller, Rolf-Dieter (2008), Das Deutsche Reich und der Zweite Weltkrieg, Band 10/1: Der Zusammenbruch des Deutschen Reiches 1945 und die Folgen des Zweiten Weltkrieges – Teilbd 1: Die militärische Niederwerfung der Wehrmacht (in German), Deutsche Verlags-Anstalt, ISBN 978-3-421-06237-6
- Hastings, Max (2005). Armageddon: The Battle for Germany, 1944–1945. Vintage. ISBN 978-0-375-71422-1.
- Howard, M. (1991). The Franco-Prussian War: The German Invasion of France 1870–1871. New York: Routledge. ISBN 0-415-26671-8.
- Santoni, Alberto (1989), Le Operazioni in Sicilia e in Calabria (Luglio-Settembre 1943) (in Italian), Roma: Stato maggiore dell'Esercito, Ufficio storico, OCLC 26838236
- Clayton, A. (2003). Paths of Glory: The French Army 1914–18. London: Cassell. ISBN 978-0-304-35949-3.
- Нелипович, Сергей Геннадьевич (2022). Русский фронт Первой мировой войны. Потери сторон 1915 [Russian front of the First World War. Losses of the parties 1915] (in Russian). Moskva: Квадрига. ISBN 978-5-91791-447-3. OCLC 1342447102.
- Askey, Nigel (2014). Operation Barbarossa: The Complete Organisational and Statistical Analysis, and Military Simulation. Vol. (II B). U.S.: Lulu Publishing. ISBN 978-1-312-41326-9.
- Bahm, Karl (2001). Berlin 1945: The Final Reckoning. St. Paul: Motorbooks International. ISBN 0-7603-1240-0.
- Clodfelter, M. (2017). Warfare and Armed Conflicts: A Statistical Encyclopedia of Casualty and Other Figures, 1492–2015 (4th ed.). Jefferson, North Carolina: McFarland. ISBN 978-0786474707.
- Frieser, Karl-Heinz (1995). Blitzkrieg-Legende: Der Westfeldzug 1940, Operationen des Zweiten Weltkrieges [The Blitzkrieg Myth: The Western Campaign in 1940, Operations of the Second World War] (in German). München: R. Oldenbourg. ISBN 3-486-56124-3.
- Sheppard, Alan (1990). France, 1940: Blitzkrieg in the West. Oxford: Osprey. ISBN 978-0-85045-958-6.
- Jones, Michael (2009). The Retreat. New York: Thomas Dunne Books. ISBN 978-0-7195-6926-5.
- Boog, Horst; Krebs, Gerhard; Vogel, Detlef (2001), Das Deutsche Reich in der Defensive Strategischer Luftkrieg in Europa, Krieg im Westen und in Ostasien 1943 bis 1944/45 [The Strategic Air War in Europe and the War in the West and East Asia 1943–1944/5], Das Deutsche Reich und die Zweite Weltkrieg (in German), vol. 7, Deutsche Verlags-Anstalt, ISBN 978-3-421-05507-1
- Pogue, Forrest C. (1954), The Supreme Command (PDF), U.S. Army in World War II: European Theater of Operations, Washington, D.C.: U.S. Army Center of Military History, LCCN 53-61717, CMH Pub. 7-1, archived from the original (PDF) on 5 September 2021
- German General Staff (1881). The Franco-German War 1870–71: Part 1; Volume 1 (2nd ed.). London: Clowes & Sons.
- Tucker, S. (2014). Zabecki, D. (ed.). Germany at War: 400 Years of Military History. ABC-CLIO. ISBN 978-1-598-84980-6.
- Clodfelter, M. (2008). Warfare and armed conflicts : a statistical encyclopedia of casualty and other figures, 1494-2007. Jefferson, North Carolina: McFarland. ISBN 978-0786433193.
- Sperling, Hans (1956). Die Luftkriegsverluste während des zweiten Weltkriegs in Deutschland [Aerial War Losses during the Second World War in Germany]. Wiesbaden: Statistisches Bundesamt Deutschland.
- Beaumont, Roger (January 1987). "The Bomber Offensive as a Second Front". Journal of Contemporary History. 22 (1): 3–19. doi:10.1177/002200948702200101. ISSN 0022-0094. S2CID 159475356.
- Delhez, Jean-Claude (2013). La bataille des Frontières Joffre attaque au centre 22–26 août 1914 (in French). Paris: Economica. p. 198. ISBN 978-2-7178-6588-2. Delhez..
- Freier, Thomas (2009). "10-Day Medical Casualty Reports". Human Losses in World War II. Archived from the original on 25 October 2012.
- Nipe, George M. Jr. (2000). Last Victory in Russia: The SS-Panzerkorps and Manstein's Kharkov Counteroffensive, February–March 1943. Atglen, PA: Schiffer. ISBN 0-7643-1186-7.
- Reynolds, Michael (1997). Steel Inferno: I SS Panzer Corps in Normandy. New York: Sarpedon. ISBN 1-885119-44-5.
- Pallud, Jean Paul (2002). "The Battle of the Mons Pocket". After the Battle (115): 2–33. ISSN 0306-154X.
- Ludewig, Joachim (2012). Rückzug: The German Retreat from France, 1944. Lexington, Kentucky: University Press of Kentucky. ISBN 978-0813140803.
