= List of ship launches in 1753 =

The list of ship launches in 1753 includes a chronological list of some ships launched in 1753.

| Date | Ship | Class | Builder | Location | Country | Notes |
|---|---|---|---|---|---|---|
| 4 June | Chichester | Third rate | Peirson Lock | Portsmouth Dockyard | Great Britain | For Royal Navy. |
| 9 June | Algonquin | Third rate | René-Nicolas Levasseur | Quebec City | New France | For French Navy. |
| 16 June | Águila | Sixth rate | Matthew Mullins | Cádiz | Spain | For Spanish Navy. |
| 17 July | Dorset | Yacht | Sir Thomas Slade | Deptford Dockyard | Great Britain | For Royal Navy. |
| 28 July | Prudent | Florissant-class ship of the line | Pierre Morineau | Rochefort | Kingdom of France | For French Navy. |
| 15 August | Oriente | Eolo-class ship of the line | Reales Astilleros de Esteiro | Ferrol | Spain | For Spanish Navy. |
| 28 August | Eolo | Eolo-class ship of the line | Reales Astilleros de Esteiro | Ferrol | Spain | For Spanish Navy. |
| 9 September | Guerrier | Magnifique-class ship of the line | Joseph-Marie-Blaise-Coulomb | Toulon | Kingdom of France | For French Navy. |
| 13 September | Capricieux | Third rate | François-Guillaume Ciarain des Lauriers | Rochefort | Kingdom of France | For French Navy. |
| 29 September | Le Duc d'Orléans | East Indiaman | Gilles Cambry | Lorient | Kingdom of France | For Compagnie des Indes. |
| 11 October | Courageux | Third rate | Jean Geoffroy | Brest | Kingdom of France | For French Navy. |
| 10 November | York | Fourth rate | John Lock, Sir Thomas Slade | Plymouth Dockyard | Great Britain | For Royal Navy. |
| 24 November | Frederik V | Second rate | Thuresen | Copenhagen | Denmark-Norway | For Dano-Norwegian Navy. |
| Unknown date | Africa | Frigate | | Caracas | (Spain) Viceroyalty of New Granada | For Spanish Navy. |
| Unknown date | America | Frigate | | Caracas | (Spain) Viceroyalty of New Granada | For Spanish Navy. |
| Unknown date | Burc-i Zafer | Second rate | | | Ottoman Empire | For Ottoman Navy. |
| Unknown date | Cron Prindz Christian | Frigate | | Copenhagen | Denmark-Norway | For private owner. |
| Unknown date | Lion | Transport ship | Sir Thomas Byard | Bucklers Hard | Great Britain | For Royal Navy. |
| Unknown date | Lyon | Hoy | Hoysteed Hacker | Bucklers Hard | Great Britain | For Royal Navy. |
| Unknown date | Møen | Fifth rate | | | Denmark-Norway | For Dano-Norwegian Navy. |
| Unknown date | Penny | Full-rigged ship | | Bombay | India | For private owner. |
| Unknown date | Princess Augusta | East Indiaman | | | Great Britain | For British East India Company. |
| Unknown date | Revenge | Frigate | | Caracas | (Spain) Viceroyalty of New Granada | For Spanish Navy. |
| Unknown date | Rijnland | Fourth rate | | Amsterdam | Dutch Republic | For Dutch Navy. |
| Unknown date | Syren | Snow | | Bombay | India | For Bombay Pilot Service. |
| Unknown date | Triton | Sixth rate | | Amsterdam | Dutch Republic | For Dutch Navy. |
| Unknown date | Zuileveld | Fourth rate | Charles Bentam | Amsterdam | Dutch Republic | For Dutch Navy. |
