= Military of New France =

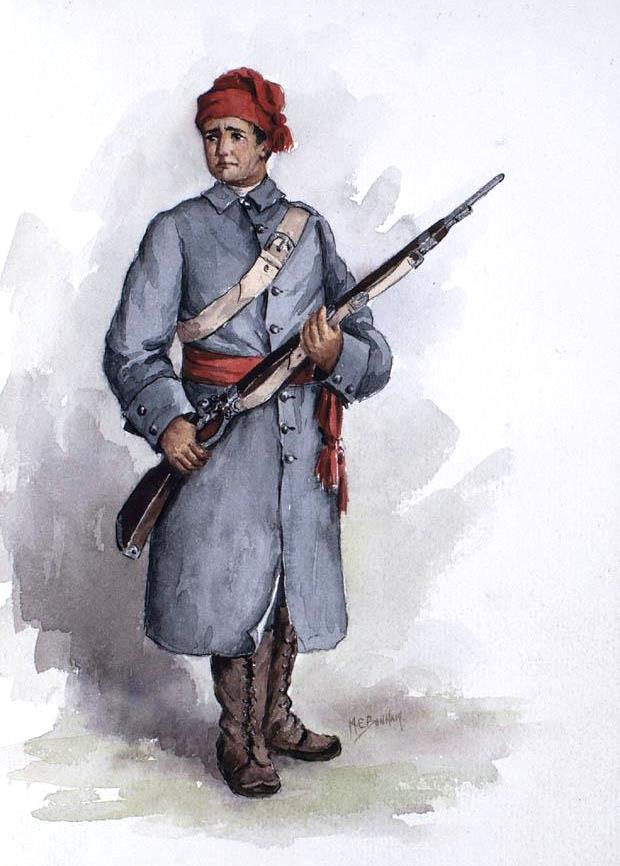
Illustration of a French Canadian militiaman in 1759

The military of New France consisted of a mix of regular forces from the French Royal Army (Carignan-Salières Regiment) and French Navy (Troupes de la marine, later Compagnies Franches de la Marine) supported by small local volunteer militia units (Colonial militia). Most early troops were sent from France, but localization after the growth of the colony meant that, by the 1690s, many were volunteers from the settlers of New France, and by the 1750s most troops were descendants of the original French inhabitants. Additionally, many of the early troops and officers who were born in France remained in the colony after their service ended, contributing to generational service and a military elite. The French built a series of forts from Newfoundland to Louisiana during the 1600s to the late 1700s. Some were a mix of military posts and trading forts.

== Military strategy ==
The soldiers of New France were either exceptionally well trained and very apt to the challenges of the colonial frontier, or they were dangerously inept. Most of the military consisted of habitant militia rather than actual French soldiers. Upon their arrival, the soldiers of New France learned quickly that the traditional military techniques seen on the battlefields of Europe were not at all effective in the New World. The Iroquois attacks on the French forced them to adapt to their current situation. Luckily the French were experts on forging alliances with the Native people and with the help from their allies the French adopted what they called "la petite guerre". This was essentially small-scale guerrilla warfare that allowed the French to harass and cripple targets slowly over time rather than engage in battle after battle, something that New France could not afford. The strategy consisted mostly of stealth and surprise attacks whose purpose lay in creating ambushes and raids, followed by immediate withdrawals from the battlefield. This strategy focused on the elimination of small groups of targets rather than capturing targets of strategic value. This style of warfare was not only well suited to the North American wilderness but it also allowed the French troops to be at a vast numerical disadvantage (outnumbered sometimes 20 to 1) and still effectively retaliate against their enemies, primarily the British. Ironically, the fact that most of the soldiers were in fact habitant militia men actually aided in the ability to fight using these strategies given that many of these men would have been hunters and would already be accustomed to hunting and stalking in forests.

== Indigenous relations ==
=== Indigenous allies ===
It was the job of the military to maintain good relations with frontier Indigenous North Americans in order to preserve French interests in the colony. In fact, preserving a positive relationship between the French and Native Peoples was the most important of the duties that were given to the military. Throughout the years the French developed ties with several Native tribes, those allies consisted mainly of the Abenakis, Algonquin, Huron, Montagnais, and Outaouais and through their partnership they taught the French much more than just military strategy. They taught them how to hunt, fish and dress their catches and they taught them how to navigate and essentially survive in the unforgiving Canadian wilderness. The French soldiers relied heavily on the Native warriors but their allegiance came at a cost. The Natives were "self interested and attached themselves only to the one who gives them the most… and if they failed to be rewarded one single time, the good that was done for them before counts for nothing". In addition, the Natives as tribes provided knowledge of the wilderness but the tribes themselves were not active in their wars as a whole. Native warriors participated in the French battles if they chose to do so usually under the arrangement that they would be compensated for their participation. Falling short on these agreements sometimes caused great discourse amongst the Natives and sometimes damaged French-Native relationships.

=== Decadence amongst the soldiers ===
Part of the job of the military was to create good trade relations with the Natives. New France relied heavily on the fur trade given that it was the only valuable commodity in the entire colony, which cost more to operate than it brought in, in profit. However, much of the military hierarchy was not based on merit but rather on internal family connections, which allowed unqualified young ambitious and greedy men to take positions of high rank. This resulted in many soldiers leaving their post for weeks at a time in order to illegally trade with the Natives. The Natives had an understanding of how the trading system worked and considered the military as "trading-goods chiefs" and because of their dereliction of duty came to recognize many soldiers as dishonest people who went against their code. In addition there were even times where the presents the king would send to keep friendly relations with the Natives were often taken and sold to them for profit instead, the only presents they would give them would be mere trinkets. Therefore, the lack of discipline amongst some of the higher ups resulted in losing face amidst the natives and subsequently losing some of their business and their allegiance to the English.

== Installations ==
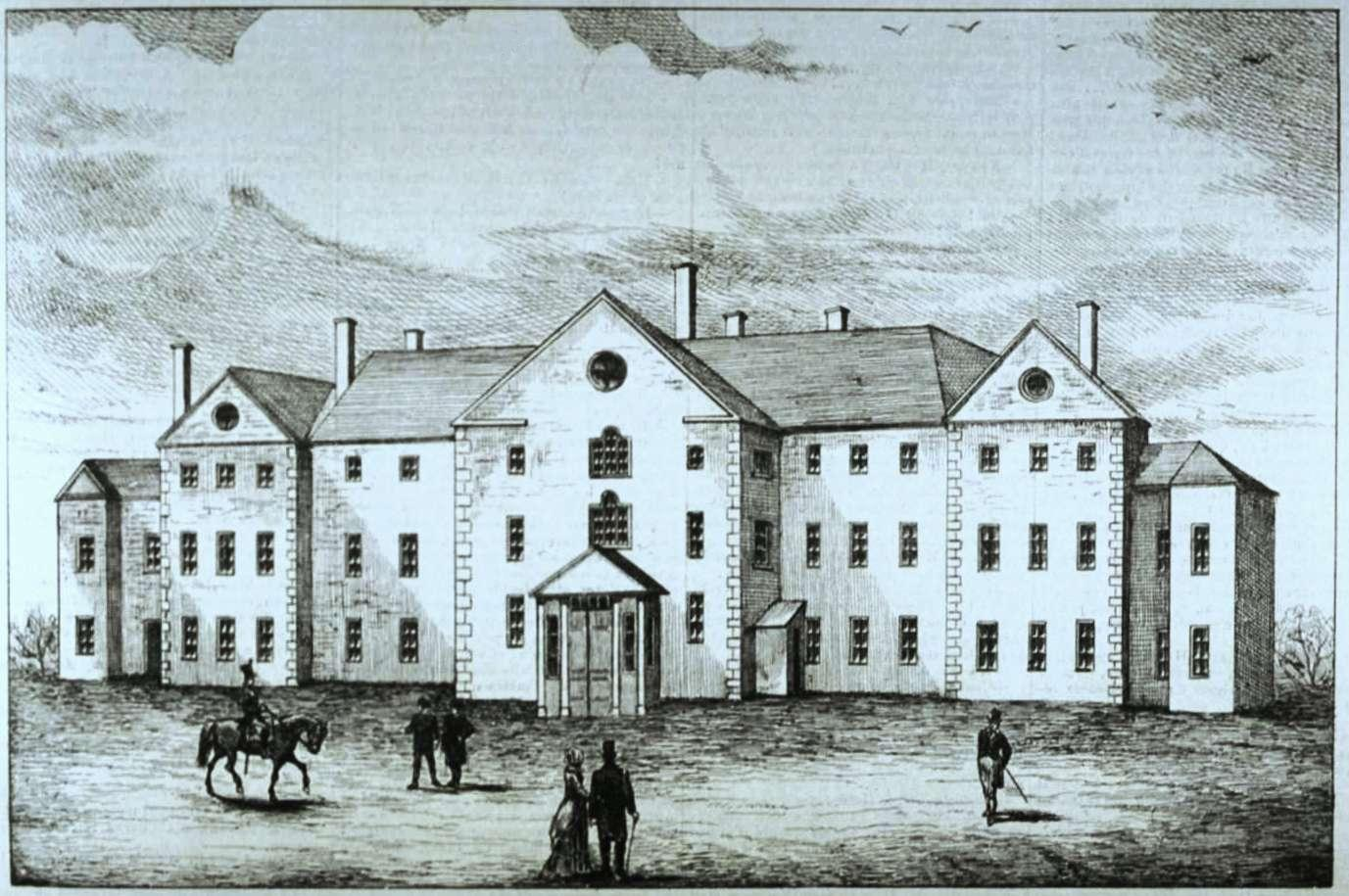
Château Saint-Louis

The French and Canadiens built forts from Newfoundland to Louisiana and others captured from the British from the 1600s to the late 1700s. Some were a mix of military post and trading forts.

- Chateau St. Louis – built 1648 with 16 redoubts; rebuilt and finally destroyed by fire 1834
- Citadelle of Quebec 1673–1872
- The Citadel, Montreal 1690–1821
- Fortress of Louisbourg, Louisbourg, (Ile Royale) Acadie 1720–1758 – destroyed in 1760 and partially rebuilt in the 1960s as a historic museum
- Port Royal, Port Royale, Acadie 1605–1613
- Fort Anne 1636–1713
- Fort Beauharnois 1727–
- Fort Beauséjour 1751–1835
- Fort Boishebert before 1696 to 1751
- Fort Bon Secours 1685-
- Fort Bourbon 1684 (by British); captured 1692 and captured by French several times and returned 1713

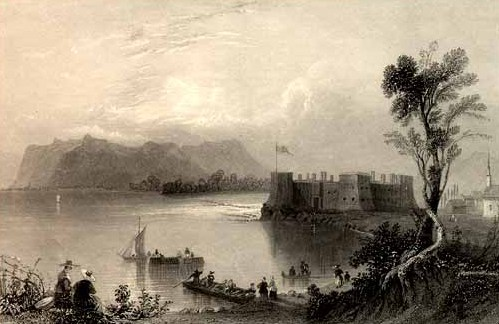
Fort Chambly 1840

- Fort Carillon 1755–1759
- Fort Chambly 1675–1776
- Fort Champlain
- Fort-Coulonge
- Fort Crevier 1687–1701
- Fort Dauphin (Manitoba) 1741–?
- Fort de Chartres
- Fort de la Montagne, Mont-Royal 1685 – Quebec and home to Governor; mostly destroyed by fire of 1854
- Fort du Sault Saint-Louis 1725
- Fort Douville 1720–1730
- Fort Duquesne 1754–1758
- Fort Frontenac Fortenac 1673–1758; rebuilt 1783
- Fort Gaspareaux 1751–1756
- Fort Kaministiquia
- Fort La Baye 1717–1760
- Fort La Biche 1753–1757

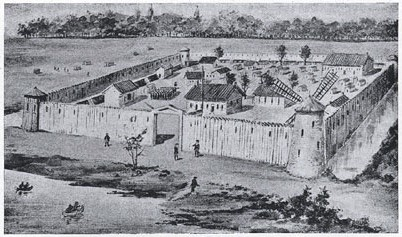
Virtual Museum of Canada Fort Lachine (1913)

- Fort La Reine 1738–?
- Fort Le Boeuf 1753–1763
- Fort Lachine (Fort Rémy), Lachine 1672–1873 and site of Lachine massacre; abandoned 1825 and destroyed 1873
- Fort de la Corne 1753–?
- Fort La Jonquière 1751–?
- Fort La Pointe 1693–1759
- Fort Laprairie, Laprairie 1687–1713; site of the Battle of La Prairie 1691
- Fort La Reine 1738–1852
- Fort Le Sueur 1695–
- Fort Machault 1754–1763
- Fort Maurepas 1734–
- Fort Menagoueche 1751–1755
- Fort Miami 1679–1680
- Fort des Miamis 1702–1760
- Fort Michilimackinac 1715–1780
- Fort Michipicoton 1725–1904

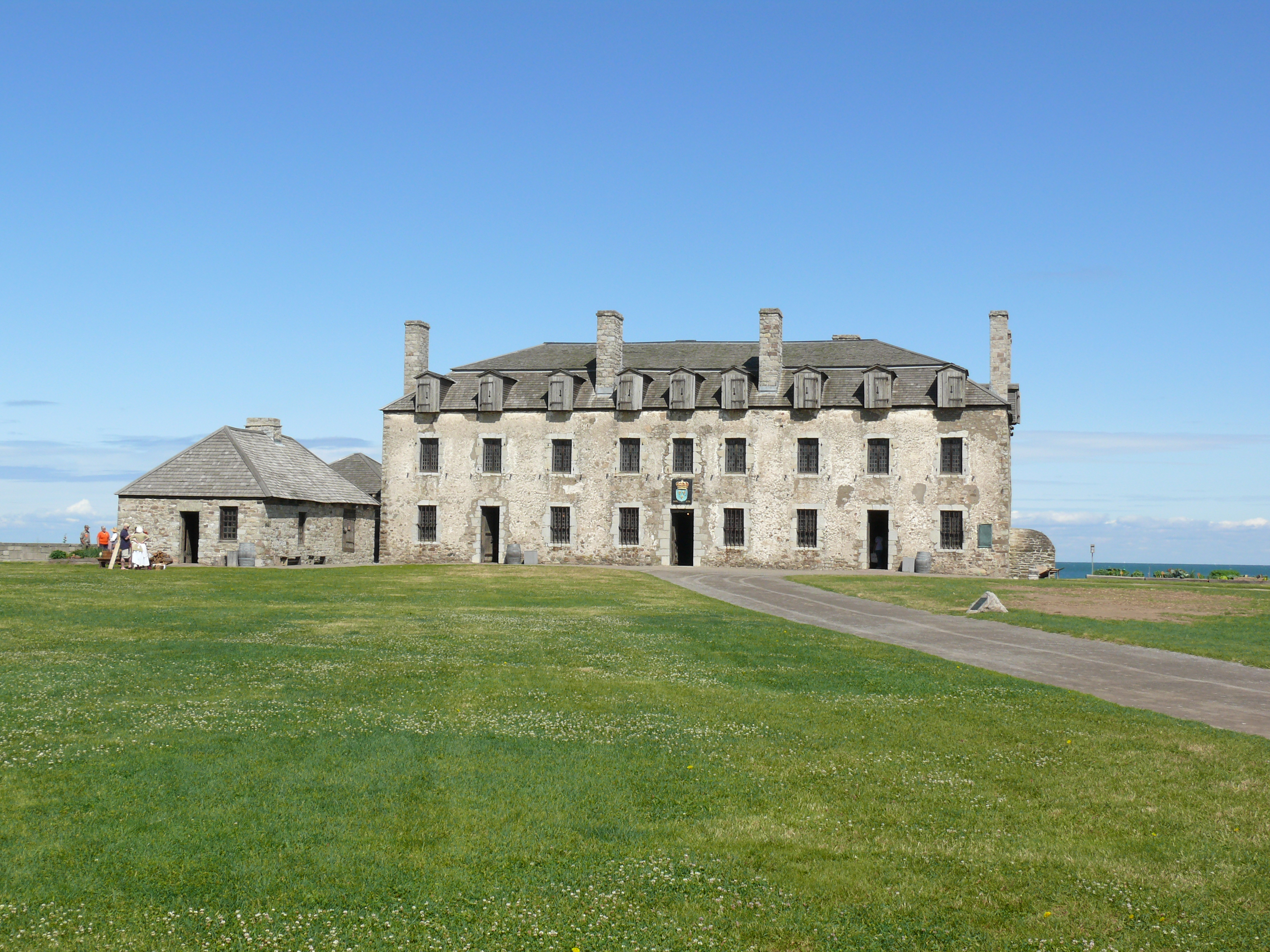
Fort Niagara

- Fort Nashwaak 1692–1700
- Fort Niagara 1726–
- Fort Ouiatenon 1717–1791
- Fort Paskoya 1741–
- Fort Pentagouet 1613–1674
- Fort Pimiteoui1691–1812
- Fort Pontchartrain du Détroit 1701–1796
- Fort Presque Isle 1753–1852
- Fort Richelieu 1665–?
- Fort Royal (Plaisance) 1687–1713
- Fort Rouge 1738–1741
- Fort Sainte Anne 1686–1693
- Fort Saint Antoine 1686–1731
- Fort Saint Charles 1732–
- Fort Sainte Croix 1683–
- Fort Saint Jacques 1686–1713
- Fort Saint Jean, La Vallée-du-Richelieu 1666 – destroyed 1760 and rebuilt by British in 1775 and had small shipyard

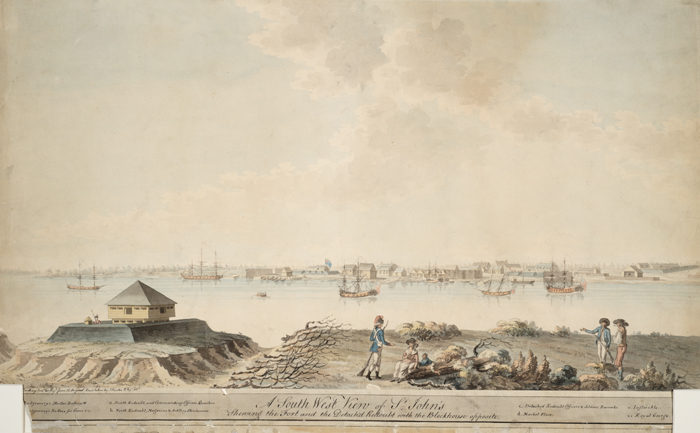
Fort Saint Jean

- Fort Saint Joseph 1691–1795
- Fort Saint Nicholas 1685-
- Fort Saint Pierre 1731–1812?
- Fort Sandoské 1747–1763
- Fort Senneville 1671–1691; 1692–1776
- Fort Tourette 1683–1763
- Fort Trempealeau 1685–1731
- Fort Verchères 1672–
- Fort Vincennes 1731–1766
- Fort Ville-Marie 1642–74; demolished 1688

== Units ==
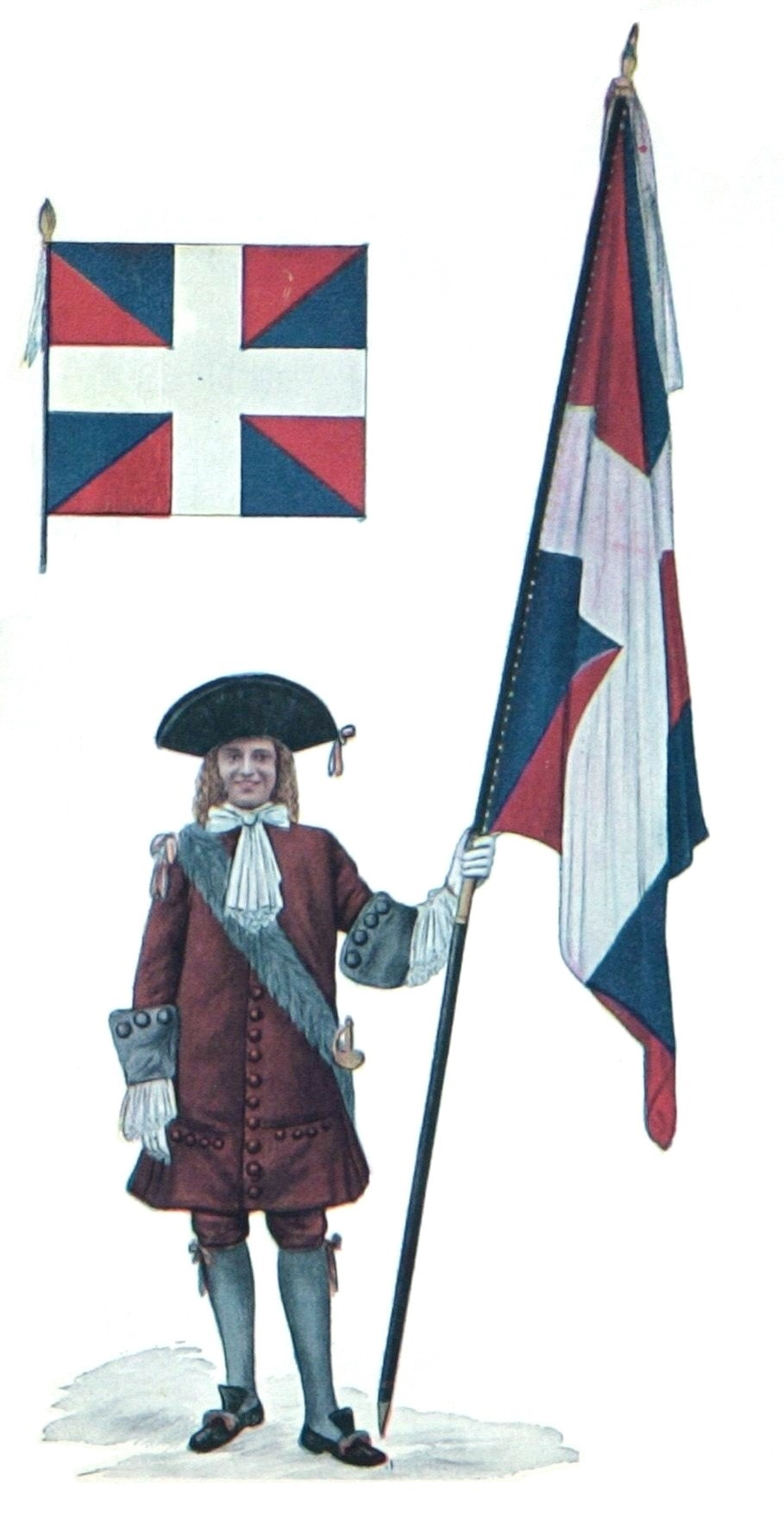
Officer of Régiment de Carignan-Salières.

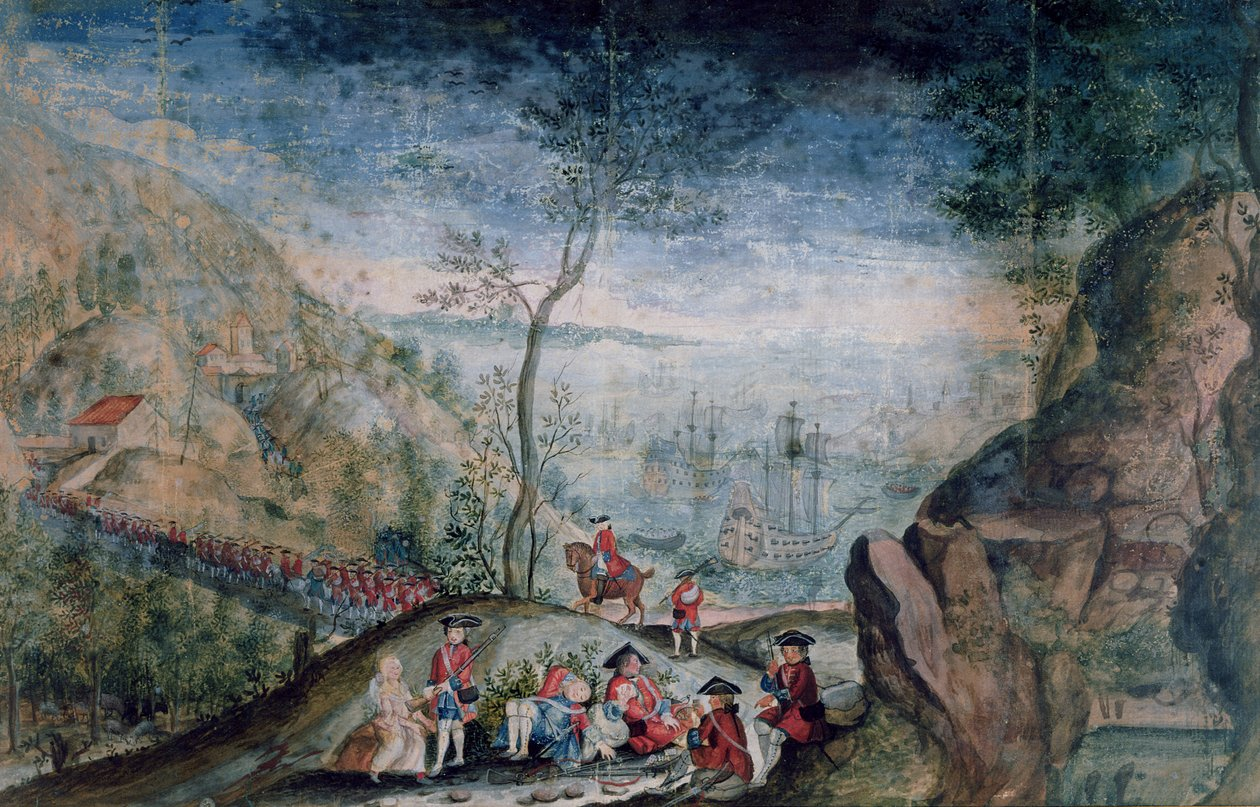
c. 1750 painting of 50 soldiers of the Karrer Regiment disembarking at Louisbourg

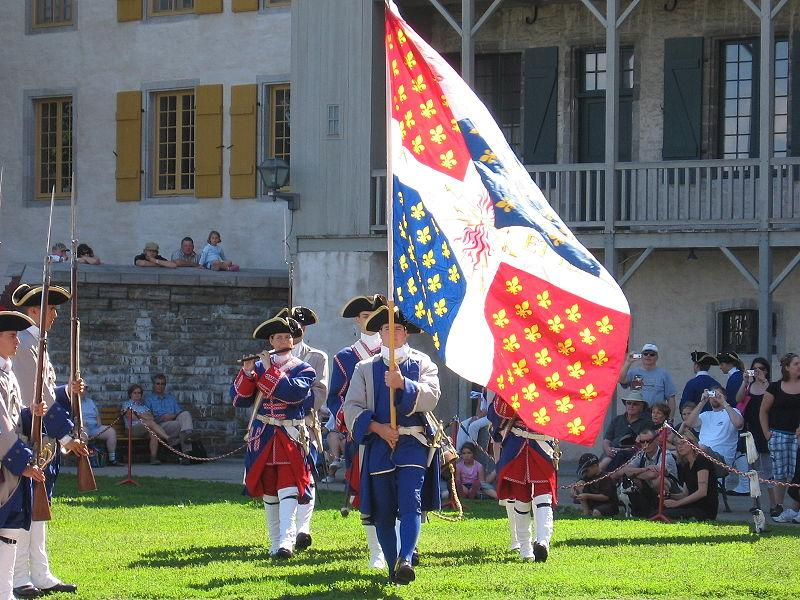
Compagnies Franches de la Marine

- French Army
  - Carignan-Salières Regiment (Régiment de Carignan-Salières) – volunteer army unit (1665–1668)
    - François Cottineau, dit Champlaurier, a member of this unit and ancestor of PM Sir Wilfrid Laurier
    - 176 soldiers and 4 officers 1740s
  - Canadian Voyageurs – militia unit
  - militia artillery corps (2 brigades) – 1723
  - Reserve companies (2 units) – 1750s
  - The Governor General's Guard 1672–1682 – 20 mounted men-at-arms or carabineers for Comte de Frontenac
  - Compagnie des canonniers-bombardiers de Quebec (Gunner and Bombardier Company) 1750–1760 – consisted of 43 gunners/bombers
  - Régiment de la Reine 1755–1760
  - Régiment de Guyenne 1755–1760
  - Régiment de Berry 1755–1760
  - Régiment de Béarn 1755–1760
  - Régiment La Sarre 1755–1760
  - Régiment Royal Roussillon 1755–1760
  - Régiment de Languedoc 1755–1760
  - Régiment de Bourgogne 1755–1760
  - Régiment d'Artois 1755–1760 – 520 soldiers
  - Régiment de Cambis 1758 – 680 soldiers
    - 2 companies
  - Marechaussee – police unit
- French Navy
  - Régiment suisse de Karrer 1722–1745 (Louisbourg); 1747–1749 (Quebec)
  - 28 Compagnies franches de la Marine of Canada 1683–1755
    - 30 companies 1750s with 1500 soldiers and 120 officers
  - Compagnies franches de la Marine of Acadia
    - 4 companies with 200 soldiers and 12 officers by 1702
  - Compagnies franches de la Marine of Plaisance
    - 3 companies with 150 soldiers and 9 officers by the 1690s
  - Compagnies franches de la Marine on Ile Royale 1710s
    - 24 companies with 1200 soldiers and 96 officers by 1749
  - Bombardiers de la Marine (Navy Bombardiers) 1702–1760s – 108 bombardiers
  - Troupes de la marine (Troops of Marines) 1682–1755 – 1759 – 1000 soldiers
  - Galley Troops (Pertuisaniers des Galères)
- Canadian Militia
  - District of Québec: 1759 – 5,640 militiamen
  - District of Montréal: 1759 – 5,455 militiamen 4,200 sent to Quebec City
  - District of Trois-Rivière: 1759 – 1,300 militiamen 1,100 to Quebec City
  - Canadian Cavalry: 200 cavalrymen
- Acadian Militia 1759 – 150 militiamen
- Native Indians 1759 – 1,800

== Military commanders ==
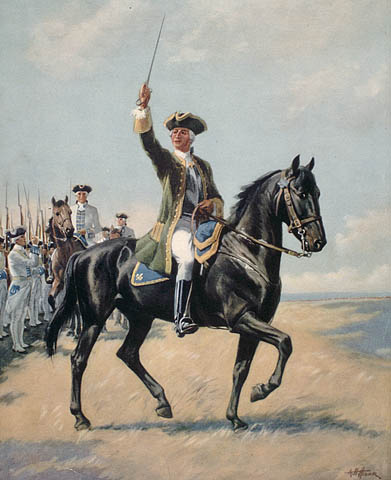
General Montcalm

- Louis-Joseph de Montcalm
- Chevalier de Lévis
- Louis Antoine de Bougainville
- François-Charles de Bourlamaque
- Claude-Pierre Pécaudy de Contrecœur
- Marquis de Denonville
- Jean-Daniel Dumas
- Daniel Liénard de Beaujeu
- Louis Coulon de Villiers
- Chevalier de la Corne
- Charles Le Moyne
- Joseph-François Hertel de la Fresnière

== French Royal Navy ==
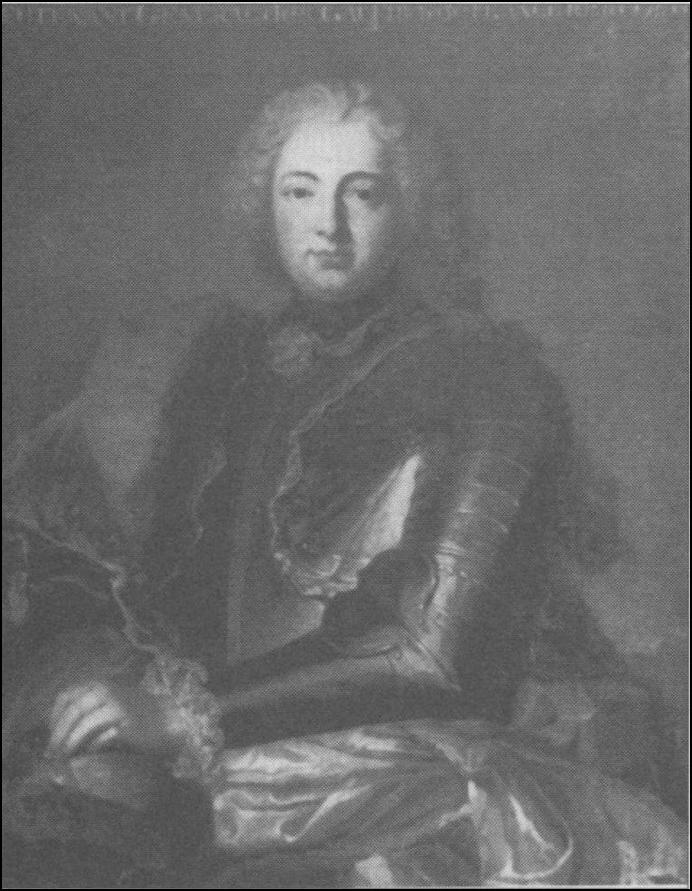
Duc d'Anville

- Jean Vauquelin
- Duc d'Anville
- Joseph de Bauffremont
- Comte de La Galissonière
- Pierre LeMoyne d'Iberville
- Louis Charles du Chaffault de Besné
- Marquis de la Jonquière
- Dubois de la Motte
- Alcide 64-guns
- L'Algonquin 74-guns
- Bienfaisant 64-guns
- Bourgogne

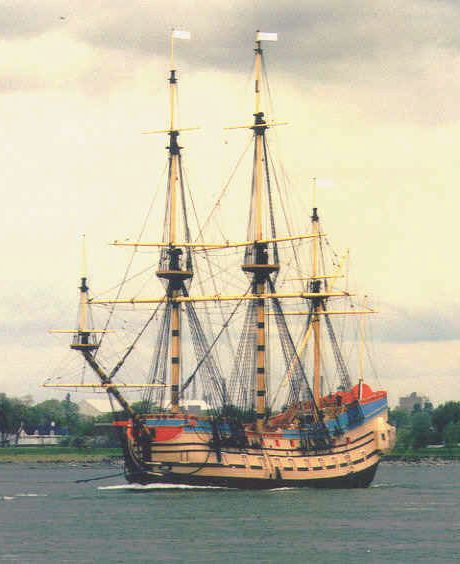
Le Pélican

- Dauphin Royal 74-guns
- Diadème 74-guns
- Duc de Bourgogne 74-guns
- Fantasque 64-guns
- Formidable 80-guns
- Héros 74-guns
- Le Machault 32-guns
- Orient 80-guns
- Pélican 44-guns
- Raisonable 64-guns
- Tonnant 84-guns

== Ships built in New France ==
A list of ships posted to New France:

- La Tempête

Ship building in New France 1650s and repair facilities were available in Quebec and Louisburg.

Ships built in Quebec shipyard include:

- 500-tonne store ship launched on June 4, 1742
- Caribou, a 700-tonne store ship launched on May 13, 1744
- Castor, a 26-gun frigate launched on May 16, 1745
- Carcajou, a 12-gun corvette built in 1744–45
- Martre, a 22-gun frigate launched on June 6, 1746
- Saint-Laurent, a 60-gun vessel launched on June 13, 1748
- Original, a 60-gun vessel – sank when launched on September 2, 1750
- Algonquin, a 72-gun ship launched in June 1753
- French frigate Abénaquise, a 30-gun frigate launched in the spring of 1756
- 30-gun frigate begun in 1756 but not completed

== Weapons ==
- muskets
  - light hunting musket by militia units
  - flintlock muskets by marines
  - matchlock muskets with bayonets by marines
- swords
- pike – used by pikemen
- hatchet – used by militiamen
- halberd

== See also ==
- Canadian Forces
- Provincial Marine
- Canadian militia
- Colonial militia in Canada
- Military history of the Mi’kmaq People
- Military history of the Acadians
