= Orignal =

Orignal may refer to:

- Moose, in Canadian French
- Mont Orignal, a ski mountain in Quebec, Canada
- French ship Orignal, an 18th-century ship of the French Navy

== See also ==
- L'Orignal, a Franco-Ontarian village in Canada
- Original (disambiguation)
