= Fort Charles =

Fort Charles may refer to:

- Fort Charles (Ghana), built in 1674
- Fort Charles (Jamaica), built between 1650 and 1660
- Fort Charles, later Fort William Henry (Pemaquid Beach, Maine), built in 1677
- Fort Charles (Menorca), which fell to the British during the Capture of Minorca (1798)
- Fort Charles (Nebraska), a trading fort established in 1795 in the Nebraska Territory
- Fort Charles (Nevis), built in the 1630s
- Fort Charles (Saint Kitts), established 1670
- Salcombe Castle, or Fort Charles, in Devon, England
- Fort Saint Jacques, or Fort Charles, founded in 1668 on James Bay in present-day Quebec
- Fort Charles (HBC vessel), operated by the HBC from 1940-1959, see Hudson's Bay Company vessels

== See also ==
- Charles Fort (disambiguation), including Charlesfort
