= Charles Fort (disambiguation) =

Charles Fort (1874–1932) was an American writer.

Charles Fort may also refer to:

- Charles Fort (poet) (born 1951), American poet
- Charles Fort (Ireland), military fort near Kinsale in Ireland
- Charles Fort (Barbados), historic military fort in Barbados
- Charlesfort, or Charles Fort, a 16th-century French settlement on Parris Island in what is now South Carolina
- Port-Royal (Acadia), originally a 1629 Scottish settlement named Charles Fort, now Charles Fort National Historic Site in Annapolis Royal, Nova Scotia, Canada

== See also ==
- Fort Charles (disambiguation)
- Charles Forte, Baron Forte (1908–2007), hotelier
