= Fort Pointe-aux-Trembles =

Coordinates: 45.6423°N 73.5050°W

- Pointe-aux-Trembles, Canada
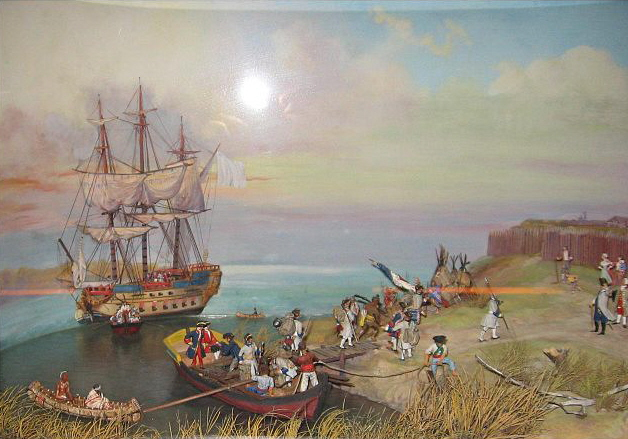
- Fort Pointe-aux-Trembles

Site information
- Type: Fort
- Controlled by: Canada (New France)

Site history
- Built: 1670
- In use: 1670-1760
- Battles/wars: Iroquois Wars, 1670-1700

Garrison information
- Past commanders: Daniel de Rémy de Courcelle, Alexander de Prouville, Sieur de Tracy
- Garrison: Carignan-Salières Regiment

Fort Pointe-aux-Trembles was a French fort built during the 17th century in New France.

== History ==
Fort Pointe-aux-Trembles was built around 1670 on the Island of Montreal in order to defend this part of the island which also included Ville-Marie.

During the first part of 1660, the religious order of Sulpicians colonized this part of the island opposite Ville-Marie. Due to a threatening situation with the Haudenosaunee, a fort was erected to defend the colonization of the Island of Montreal and protect the banks along the St. Lawrence River.

With the construction of this fort, the parish of Pointe-aux-Trembles became the second parish of the island of Montreal. The palissade fort surrounded the small village on the eastern side of the island. The fort has a mill and a chapel as well.

In 1693, land titles were given to the inhabitants who later became part of the community of Vieux—Pointe-aux-Trembles.

Towards the beginning of the following century, the Chemin du Roy was traced, and it became the first carriage road to link Montreal to Quebec City.

In 1845, the municipality of Pointe-aux-Trembles was formed.

Today, Parc du Fort-de-Pointe-aux-Trembles extends on this historical part of the island.

== See also ==
- Pointe-aux-Trembles
- List of French forts in North America
