= French frigate Aquilon (1733) =

History

France
- Name: Aquilon
- Builder: Rene-Nicolas Levasseur
- Laid down: July 1731
- Launched: 24 November 1733
- Completed: April 1734
- Fate: Wrecked 14 May 1757

General characteristics
- Displacement: 1200 tonneaux
- Tons burthen: 660 port tonneaux
- Complement: 250
- Armament: Broadside weight: 192 French livre; 22 × French 12-pounder guns; 20 × French 6-pounder guns

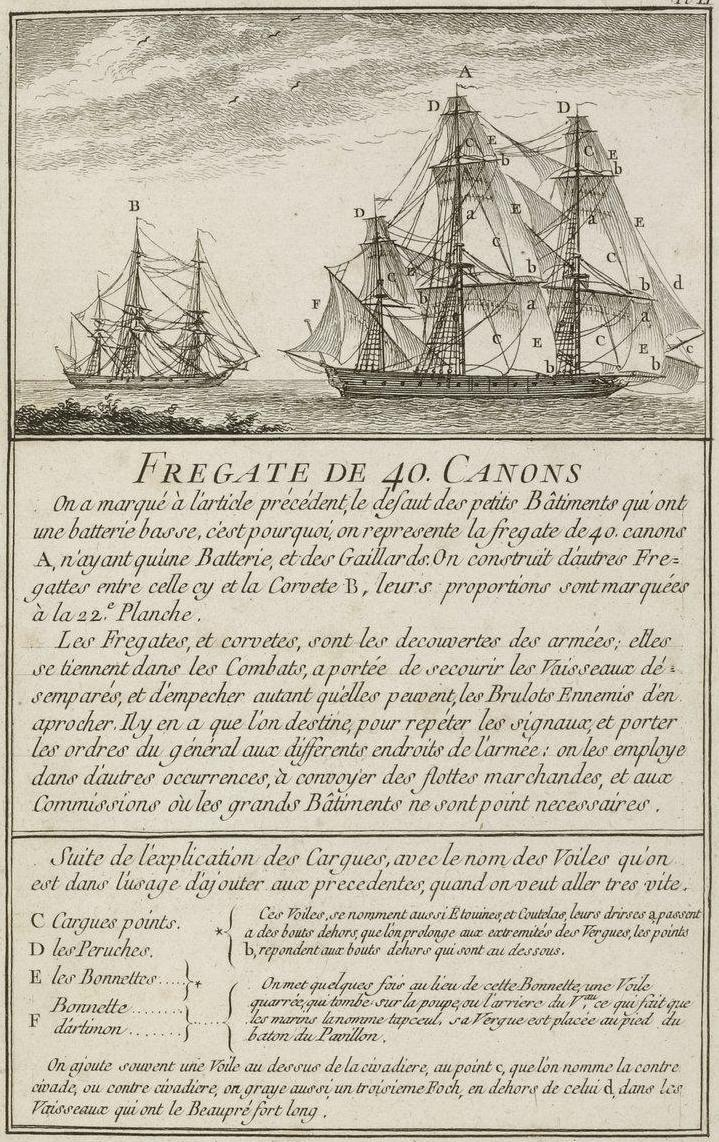
Model of a large 40-gun frigate from the mid-18th century.

Aquilon was a 42-gun fifth-rate frigate of the French Navy. She was ship-rigged purpose-built by Rene-Nicolas Levasseur, and was commissioned in April 1734. She was sunk in action on 14 May 1757, when HMS Antelope drove her ashore in the bay of Audierne.
