= List of battles with most French military fatalities =

This is a list of battles with most French military fatalities, being only French deaths.

== Criteria ==
Only battles and campaigns in which the number of French military fatalities exceed 1,000 are listed. The term casualty in warfare refers to a soldier who is no longer fit to fight after being in combat. Casualties can include killed, wounded, missing, captured or deserted. In the list below, the numbers killed refer to those killed in action, killed by disease, missing presumed dead, or someone who died from their wounds.

== Battles ==
Battle or siege	Conflict	Date	Estimated number killed	Opposing force	References
Battle of Verdun	World War I	February 21 to December 18, 1916	163,000 killed	(German Empire) Germany	
Siege of Sevastopol (1854–1855)	Crimean War	October 17, 1854 to September 11, 1855	80,240 killed (Note: 10,240 killed in combat, 20,000 died of wounds, and 50,000 died of disease)	Russian Empire (Kingdom of Greece) Greek Volunteer Legion	
First Battle of the Marne	World War I	September 5 to 14, 1914	80,000 killed	(German Empire) Germany	
Battle of the Ardennes	World War I	August 21 to 23, 1914	25,000 killed	(German Empire) Germany	
Battle of Dunkirk	World War II	May 26 to June 4, 1940	18,000 killed	(Nazi Germany) Germany	(Note: See Battle of Dunkirk infobox)
Battle of Crécy	Hundred Years' War	August 26, 1346	12,000 killed (Note: Per a count by English heralds after the battle, the bodies of 1,542 French noble men-at-arms were found. However, this figure possibly does not include nobles who died in later combat actions. Furthermore, no count was made for non-noble foot soldiers. Historian Alfred Burne estimated that 2,000 French noble men-at-arms were killed and 10,000 infantry were killed for a total of 12,000 French dead.)	England	
Battle of Charleroi	World War I	August 21 to 23, 1914	10,000 killed	(German Empire) Germany	
Siege of Zaragoza (1809)	Peninsular War	December 19, 1808 to February 20, 1809	10,000 killed (Note: 4,000 in combat and 6,000 due to disease)	Spain	
Siege of Genoa (1800)	War of the Second Coalition	April 19 to June 4, 1800	8,000 killed	(Habsburg monarchy) Holy Roman Empire (Kingdom of Great Britain) Great Britain	
Battle of Borodino	French invasion of Russia	September 7, 1812	6,753 killed (Note: 460 officers and 6,293 soldiers)	Russian Empire	
Battle of Agincourt	Hundred Years' War	October 25, 1415	6,000 killed	England	
Battle of the Nile (part of the French invasion of Egypt and Syria)	War of the Second Coalition	August 1 to 3, 1798	5,265 killed (Note: Estimates range from 1,600 to 5,265)	(Kingdom of Great Britain) Great Britain	
Battle of Monte Cassino	World War II	January 17 to May 18, 1944	4,345 killed	(Nazi Germany) Germany; Italian Social Republic	
Battle of Solferino	Second Italian War of Independence	June 24, 1859	3,887 killed	(Austrian Empire) Austria	
Battle of Sedan	Franco-Prussian War	September 1 to 2, 1870	3,220 killed	(Kingdom of Prussia) Prussia (Kingdom of Saxony) Saxony (Kingdom of Bavaria) Bavaria	
Battle of Fleurus (1690)	Nine Years' War	July 1, 1690	3,000 killed	(Dutch Republic) Netherlands; Spain	
Battle of Honnecourt	Franco-Spanish War (1635–1659)	May 26, 1642	3,000 killed (Note: Estimates range from 1,200 to 3,000 killed)	Spain	
Battle of St. Quentin (1557)	Italian War of 1551–1559	August 10, 1557	3,000 killed	Spain; England	
Siege of Acre (1799) (part of the French invasion of Egypt and Syria)	War of the Second Coalition	March 20 to May 21, 1799	2,300 killed	Ottoman Empire (Kingdom of Great Britain) Great Britain	
Siege of Alexandria (1801)	War of the Second Coalition	August 17 to September 2, 1801	2,000 killed	United Kingdom	
Battle of Dobro Pole	World War I	September 15 to 18, 1918	1,850 killed	Bulgaria	
Battle of Hébuterne	World War I	June 7 to 13, 1915	1,760 killed	(German Empire) Germany	
Liberation of Paris	World War II	August 19 to 26, 1944	1,730 killed (Note: 1,600 from the French Resistance and 130 from the French Liberation Army)	(Nazi Germany) Germany; Vichy France	
Battle of Solferino	Second Italian War of Independence	June 24, 1859	1,622 killed (Note: 117 officers and 1,505 soldiers)	(Austrian Empire) Austria	
Siege of Aintab	Franco-Turkish War	April 1, 1920 to February 8, 1921	1,600 killed	(Turkey) Kuva-yi Milliye (Turkish militia forces)	
Siege of Fort St Philip	Seven Years' War	April 20 to June 29, 1756	1,600 killed	(Kingdom of Great Britain) Great Britain	
Battle of the Golden Spurs	Franco-Flemish War	July 11, 1302	1,500 killed (Note: Estimates range from around 1,000 to 1,500 men-at-arms and knights killed)	County of Flanders; County of Namur	
Battle of Mars-la-Tour	Franco-Prussian War	August 16, 1870	1,367 killed	(Kingdom of Prussia) Prussia	
Siege of Maubeuge	World War I	August 24 to September 7, 1914	1,300 killed	(German Empire) Germany	
Battle of Austerlitz	War of the Third Coalition	December 2, 1805	1,288 killed	(Russian Empire) Russia (Austrian Empire) Austria	
Battle of Gravelotte	Franco-Prussian War	August 18, 1870	Over 1,146 killed (Note: According to Michael Howard, French casualty records for the Battle of Gravelotte are "incomplete")	(Kingdom of Prussia) Prussia (Kingdom of Saxony) Saxony	
Battle of Marengo	War of the Second Coalition	June 14, 1800	1,100 killed	(Habsburg monarchy) Holy Roman Empire	
First Battle of Krithia	World War I	April 28, 1915	1,001 killed	Ottoman Empire	
Battle of Hallue	Franco-Prussian War	December 23 to 24, 1870	Over 1,000 killed	(Kingdom of Prussia) Prussia	

== Campaigns ==
Campaign	Conflict	Date	Estimated number killed	Opposing force	References
Battle of the Frontiers	World War I	August 7 to September 6, 1914	75,000 killed	(German Empire) Germany	
Battle of France	World War II	May 10 to June 25, 1940	~60,000 killed	(Nazi Germany) Germany (Kingdom of Italy) Italy	
Battle of the Somme	World War I	July 1 to November 18, 1916	50,729 killed	(German Empire) Germany	
Second Battle of Artois	World War I	May 9 to June 18, 1915	35,000 killed	(German Empire) Germany	
Nivelle offensive	World War I	April 16 to May 9, 1917	Over 33,000 killed (Note: 28,000 killed in action and 5,000 died of wounds between April 16 and 25 only)	(German Empire) Germany	
Third Battle of Artois (Note: Also known as the Loos–Artois Offensive)	World War I	September 25 to November 4, 1915	18,657 killed	(German Empire) Germany	
Gallipoli campaign	World War I	February 19, 1915 to January 9, 1916	9,000 killed	Ottoman Empire	
Italian campaign	World War II	July 9, 1943 to May 2, 1945	8,600 killed	(Nazi Germany) Germany; Italian Social Republic	
Western Allied invasion of Germany	World War II	March 22 to May 8, 1945	4,967 killed	(Nazi Germany) Germany (Kingdom of Hungary) Hungary	
Tunisian campaign (part of the North African campaign)	World War II	November 12, 1942 to May 13, 1943	2,838 killed	(Nazi Germany) Germany (Fascist Italy) Italy	
Conquest of New France	Seven Years' War	July 24, 1758 to September 8, 1760	1,448 killed (Note: Estimates range from 1,103 to 1,448 killed. Estimates include soldiers of the French Royal Army, Canadian militia and warriors of the Wabanaki Confederacy. It is unknown how many of each were killed.)	(Kingdom of Great Britain) Great Britain; British Ameirca (Haudenosaunee) Iroquois	
Kamerun campaign	World War I	August 6, 1914 to March 10, 1916	1,004 killed	(German Empire) Germany	

== See also ==
- List of battles with most Italian military fatalities

== Bibliography ==
- Aspinall-Oglander, C. F. (1929). Military Operations Gallipoli: Inception of the Campaign to May 1915. History of the Great War Based on Official Documents by Direction of the Historical Section of the Committee of Imperial Defence. Vol. I (1st ed.). London: Heinemann. OCLC 464479053.
- Bodart, Gaston (1908). Militär-historisches Kriegs-Lexikon (1618–1905).
- Bodart, Gaston (1916). "Losses of Life in Modern Wars: Austria-Hungary; France". New York: Clarendon Press.
- Bonner, E.A. (1992). "Continuing the 'Auld Alliance' in the Sixteenth Century". In Simpson, Grant G. (ed.). The Scottish Soldier Abroad, 1247–1967. Rowman & Littlefield.
- Brose, E. D. (2001). The Kaiser's Army: The Politics of Military Technology in Germany During the Machine Age, 1870–1918. London: Oxford University Press. ISBN 978-0-19-517945-3.
- Clodfelter, M. (2017). Warfare and Armed Conflicts: A Statistical Encyclopedia of Casualty and Other Figures, 1492–2015 (4th ed.). Jefferson, North Carolina: McFarland. ISBN 978-0786474707.
- Curry, Anne (2006) [2005]. Agincourt: A New History. Barnsley: Tempus. ISBN 978-0-7524-2828-4.
- De Périni, Hardÿ (1898). Batailles françaises, 1621 to 1643 (in French). Vol. III. Ernest Flammarion.
- Delhez, Jean-Claude (2013). La bataille des Frontières Joffre attaque au centre 22–26 août 1914 (in French). Paris: Economica. p. 198. ISBN 978-2-7178-6588-2. Delhez..
- Doughty, R. A. (2005). Pyrrhic Victory: French Strategy and Operation in the Great War. Cambridge, Massachusetts: The Belknap Press of Harvard University. ISBN 0-67401-880-X.
- France (1929). Les armées françaises dans la Grande guerre. Tome IX. 9,2 [The French Armies in the Great War] (in French). Paris: Imprimerie nationale.
- Gardiner, Robert, ed (2001 [1996]). Nelson Against Napoleon. Caxton Editions. ISBN 1-86176-026-4
- Gilbert, Adrian (2022). "Siege of Acre: Facts & Related Content". Encyclopedia Britannica.
- Greenhalgh, Elizabeth (2014). The French Army and the First World War. Cambridge: Cambridge University Press. ISBN 978-1-107-60568-8.
- Harris, J. P. (2009) [2008]. Douglas Haig and the First World War (repr. ed.). Cambridge: CUP. ISBN 978-0-521-89802-7.
- Herwig, H. (2009). The Marne, 1914: The Opening of World War I and the Battle that Changed the World. New York: Random House. ISBN 978-1-4000-6671-1.
- Howard, M. (1991). The Franco-Prussian War: The German Invasion of France 1870–1871. New York: Routledge. ISBN 0-415-26671-8.
- Martinien, A. (1899). Tableaux par corps et par batailles des officiers tues et blesses pendant les guerres de l'Empire (1805–1815).
- Pajol, Charles Pierre Victor (1888). Les guerres sous Louis XV (in French). Vol. IV. Firmin Didot frères, fils et Cie.
- Philpott, W. (2009). Bloody Victory: The Sacrifice on the Somme and the Making of the Twentieth Century. London: Little, Brown. ISBN 978-1-4087-0108-9.
- Pierrefeu, J. (1919). Les cahiers de la victoire. L'offensive du 16 avril. La vérité sur l'affaire Nivelle [The Victory Notebooks. The April 16 Offensive: The truth about the Nivelle Affair] (in French). Paris: Renaissance du livre. OCLC 491611806.
- Playfair, I. S. O.; Molony, C. J. C.; Flynn, F. C. & Gleave, T. P. (2004) [1st. pub. HMSO 1966]. Butler, J. R. M. (ed.). The Mediterranean and Middle East: The Destruction of the Axis Forces in Africa. History of the Second World War United Kingdom Military Series. Vol. IV. Uckfield: Naval & Military Press. ISBN 1-84574-068-8.
- Quellien, Jean (2010). "Les pertes humaines". La France pendant la Seconde Guerre mondiale – Atlas historique (in French) (online scan ed.). éd. Fayard, ministère de la Défense. OCLC 812049413.
- Roberts, Andrew (2014). Napoleon, A Life. New York: Penguin Group. ISBN 978-0-670-02532-9.
- Sumption, Jonathan (2015). The Hundred Years War: Cursed Kings. Vol. IV. London: Faber & Faber. ISBN 978-0-571-27454-3.
- Tuchman, B. (1962). The Guns of August. London: Constable.
- Warner, Oliver (1960). The Battle of the Nile. London: B. T. Batsford.
- Rogers, Clifford J. (1999). "The Age of the Hundred Years' War". In Keen, Maurice (ed.). Medieval Warfare: A History (Repr. ed.). Oxford: Oxford University Press. pp. 136–60. ISBN 978-0-19-820639-2.
- Verbruggen, J. F. (2002) [1952]. The Battle of the Golden Spurs: Courtrai, 11 July 1302 (Rev. ed.). Woodbridge: Boydell Press. ISBN 978-0-85115-888-4.
- Wagner, John A. (2006). Encyclopedia of the Hundred Years War (PDF). Westport, CT: Greenwood Press. ISBN 978-0-313-32736-0. Archived from the original (PDF) on 16 July 2018.
- German General Staff (1881). The Franco-German War 1870–71: Part 1; Volume 1 (2nd ed.). London: Clowes & Sons.
