= René-Nicolas Levasseur =

French ship builder (1707–1784)

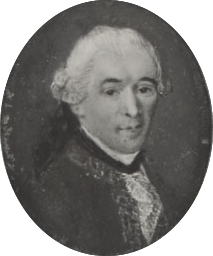
- Born: 1705 or 1707; France
- Died: August 2nd, 1784; Aubagne, France
- Citizenship: France
- Occupations: Ship Builder, Administrator
- Children: 1

René-Nicolas Levasseur was a French ship builder and administrator. Born in either 1705 or 1707, he died in Aubagne, France on August 2, 1784. He was appointed Seigneur de St-Armand on September 23, 1748. He designed the Abénaquise Class (1753), of 38 Guns.

He was involved in the launch of the Original (62) on September 2, 1750, a Saint Laurent class ship-of-the-line, which broke into two halves during its launching and sank. This was attributed to poor wood, which had been chosen by Levasseur himself. Some say that he was aware of the defects of his Saint-Armand wood, and decided to push his luck in order to meet the increasing demand for warships.

His son, Pierre Levasseur was also a shipbuilder.

He would move back to France in 1760, having sold his signatory to a merchant from London.

Ships of Rene-Nicolas Levasseur
Ship	Date	His Role	Ship Type
Aquilon	November 24, 1733	Launched	Frigate (42-Gun)
Canada	June 4, 1742	Launched	Frigate (28-Gun)
Caribou	May 13, 1744	Launched	Ship-of-the-line (52-Gun)
Écrevisse	March, 1745	Launched	Gabarre
Saint Laurent	June 13, 1748	Launched	Ship-of-the-line (60-Gun)
Abénaquise Class	1753	Designed	(38-Gun Demi-Batterie)
Algonquin	July 3, 1753	Launched	Ship-of-the-line (72-Gun)
Abénaquise	June, 1756	Launched	(38-Gun Demi-Batterie)
