= List of battles with most Canadian military fatalities =

This article contains a list of battles and military campaigns with most Canadian military deaths.

== Introduction ==
This article lists battles and campaigns in which the number of Canadian military fatalities exceed 1,000. The term casualty in warfare refers to a soldier who is no longer fit to fight after being in combat. Casualties can include killed, wounded, missing, captured or deserted.

== Battles ==
Battle or siege	Conflict	Date	Estimated number killed	Opposing force	References
Battle of Passchendaele	World War I	July 31 to November 10, 1917	Over 4,000 killed	(German Empire) Germany	
Battle of Vimy Ridge	World War I	April 9 to 12, 1917	3,598 killed	(German Empire) Germany	
Battle of Flers–Courcelette (part of the Battle of the Somme)	World War I	September 15 to 22, 1916	~2,500 killed	(German Empire) Germany	
Battle of Hill 70	World War I	August 15 to 23, 1917	2,025 killed (Note: 881 from the 1st Canadian Division, 763 from the 2nd Canadian Division, and 381 from the 4th Canadian Division)	(German Empire) Germany	
Second Battle of Ypres	World War I	April 22 to May 25, 1915	Over 2,000 killed (Note: Between April 22 and April 24 only.)	(German Empire) Germany	
Siege of Louisbourg (1758)	Seven Years' War and the French and Indian War	June 8 to 26, 1758	~1,751 killed (Note: 102 Regulars, militia and Mi'kmaq and 1,649 Acadian militia, Acadian partisans, and Acadian civilians)	(Kingdom of Great Britain) Great Britain; British America	
Falaise pocket	World War II	August 12 to 21, 1944	1,479 killed	(Nazi Germany) Germany	
Battle of Ortona	World War II	December 20 to 28, 1943	1,375 killed	(Nazi Germany) Germany	
Battle of Mont Sorrel	World War I	June 2 to 13, 1916	Over 1,100 killed	(German Empire) Germany	
Battle of Amiens (1918)	World War I	August 8 to 12, 1918	Over 1,036 killed (Note: 1,036 killed on August 8th only)	(German Empire) Germany	
Battle of St. Julien (part of the Second Battle of Ypres)	World War I	April 22 to May 5, 1915	~1,000 killed (Note: Between April 22nd and May 3rd only)	(German Empire) Germany	

== Campaigns ==
Campaign	Conflict	Date	Estimated number killed	Opposing force	References
Hundred Days Offensive	World War I	August 8 to November 11, 1918	11,000 killed (Note: Over 6,800 killed between September and November per Veterans Affairs Canada)	(German Empire) Germany; Austria-Hungary	
Defence of the Reich	World War II	September 4, 1939 to May 8, 1945	Around 10,000 killed (Note: Between 1940 and 1945)	(Nazi Germany) Germany (Kingdom of Italy) Italy; Romania (Kingdom of Hungary) Hungary (Slovak Republic (1939–1945)) Slovakia	
Battle of the Somme	World War I	July 1 to November 18, 1916	8,000 killed (Note: Estimates range from 7,000 to 8,000)	(German Empire) Germany	
Liberation of the Netherlands	World War II	September 1944 to April 1945	Over 7,600 killed	(Nazi Germany) Germany	
Italian campaign	World War II	July 9, 1943 to May 2, 1945	~5,900 killed (Note: Estimates range from 5,300 to 5,900)	(Nazi Germany) Germany; Italian Social Republic	
Battle of Normandy	World War II	June 6 to August 25, 1944	5,021 killed	(Nazi Germany) Germany	
Expulsion of the Acadians	Seven Years' War and the French and Indian War	August 10, 1755 to July 11, 1764	~5,000 killed (Note: Unknown Regulars, militia and Mi'kmaq killed. 5,000 Acadian militia, Acadian partisans, and Acadian civilians died due to disease, starvation or shipwrecks. Unknown combat deaths.)	(Kingdom of Great Britain) Great Britain; British America	
Battles of the Hindenburg Line (part of the Hundred Days Offensive)	World War I	September 12 to October 17, 1918	4,367 killed (Note: Between August 22 and October 11)	(German Empire) Germany	
Battle of the Atlantic	World War II	September 10, 1939 to May 8, 1945 (Note: Canada joined the Battle of the Atlantic on 10 September 1939)	4,352 killed (Note: 2,000 from the Royal Canadian Navy, 1,600 merchant seamen, and 752 from the Royal Canadian Air Force)	(Nazi Germany) Germany (Fascist Italy) Italy	
Rhineland Offensive	World War II	February 8 to March 27, 1945	Over 2,300 killed	(Nazi Germany) Germany	
Western Allied invasion of Germany	World War II	March 22 to May 8, 1945	1,747 killed	(Nazi Germany) Germany (Kingdom of Hungary) Hungary	
Conquest of New France	Seven Years' War and the French and Indian War	July 24, 1758 to September 8, 1760	~1,448 killed (Note: Estimates range from 1,103 to 1,448 killed. Estimates include soldiers of the French Royal Army, Canadian militia and warriors of the Wabanaki Confederacy. It is unknown how many of each were killed.)	(Kingdom of Great Britain) Great Britain; British Ameirca (Haudenosaunee) Iroquois	
Moro River campaign (part of the Italian campaign)	World War II	December 4, 1943 to January 4, 1944	1,375 killed	(Nazi Germany) Germany	
Gothic Line offensive (part of the Italian campaign)	World War II	August 25, 1944 to March 1945	1,016 killed	(Nazi Germany) Germany; Italian Social Republic	
Liberation of Belgium	World War II	September 2, 1944 to February 4, 1945	~1,000 killed (Note: Over 800 known graves)	(Nazi Germany) Germany	
