= Fort Laprairie =

Building in Quebec, Canada

Coordinates: 45°25′15″N 73°29′48″W

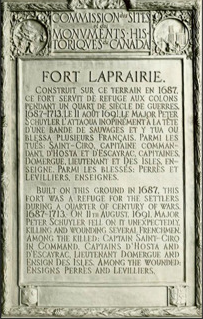

Fort Laprairie was constructed in 1687, and served as a military fort in New France until 1713. The fort was attacked by English and Dutch colonists under Major Pieter Schuyler on August 11, 1691, but resisted to the invaders.

The site where the fort had once stood was designated as a National Historic Site of Canada in 1921. It is now a residential area and park (Place La Mennais) located on rue Émile-Gamelin in La Prairie, Quebec. A cairn for second battle is located at Chemin de la Bataille Nord and Chemin de Saint Jean

== See also ==
- Military of New France
- List of French forts in North America
