= Fort de Cavagnial =

French fort and trading post

- north of Fort Leavenworth, Kansas
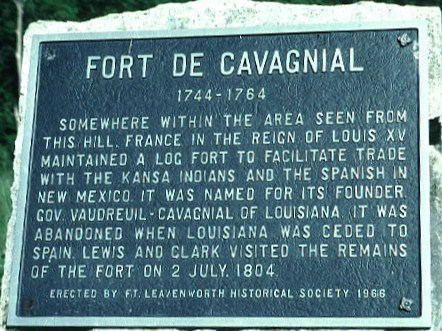

Site information
- Type: Fort
- Controlled by: New France; Spain

Site history
- Built: 1744
- In use: 1744-1764

Garrison information
- Past commanders: François Coulon de Villiers (c. 1746–1750); Augustin-Antoine de la Barre (1750–1751); Louis Robineau de Portneuf (1751–c. 1754); Jean Francois Tisserant de Moncharvaux (c.1754–c. 1758)

Fort de Cavagnial (also known as Fort Cavagnolle, Fort Cavagnal, Post of the Missouri, or Fort de la Trinité) was a French fort and trading post located on the west cliffs of the Missouri River, somewhere north of Kansas City, Kansas, and Fort Leavenworth, Kansas, from 1744 until about 1764. While the ruins of the site were still visible when Meriwether Lewis and William Clark ventured in the area during their famed 1804 westward expedition, all traces of the fort were eventually lost by the mid-19th century. The exact location of the fort is a mystery.

== History ==
=== Active service ===
The fort named for Louisiana Governor Marquis de Vaudreuil-Cavagnial, was the furthest west on the Missouri at the time. Its first commandant was François Coulon de Villiers who came from an illustrious New France military family. Like many frontier forts it doubled as a trading post operated by Joseph Athanase Trottier dit Desruisseaux (Joseph Deruisseau), who had a monopoly on trade on the Missouri from January 1, 1745, to May 20, 1750. Deruisseau chose the specific location of the fort because "the 'friendly Kansa[s] were a dependable source of high grade furs' and the location was strategic". According to the Kansas Historical Society, the fort was:

small but substantial ... with a surrounding stockade of stout piles and with bastions at each of the four stockade corners. Internal buildings included a commandant's house, a guardhouse, a powder house, a trader's house, and a house for the trader's employees. The buildings were constructed of logs and most were covered with mud.

=== Decline and abandonment ===
The fort declined sometime after the French and Indian War (1754–1763). During this time, the area in which Fort de Cavagnial came under the power of Spain, although French soldiers remained at the site of the fort until 1764, when Pierre-Joseph Neyon de Villiers (acting on behalf of Jean-Jacques Blaise d'Abbadie, the director-general of the Colony of Louisiana) ordered that the troops stationed in the area to "throw down" the outpost and retreat to New Orleans. Evidently, the site was not completely razed, for in 1804, Meriwether Lewis and William Clark stumbled across the old site during their westward expedition, noting in their journal that "[Fort de Cavagnial] may be recognised by some remains of chimneys, and the general outline of the fortification, as well as by the fine spring which supplied it with water." In 1819, explorers on Stephen Harriman Long's Yellowstone expedition described the ruins as "a few miles below Isle au Vache". By the mid-19th century, all traces of the fort were gone.

== Location ==
The exact location of the fort is unknown, with conflicting reports about its relationship to trade with the Kansa tribe. British reports placed it below the confluence of the Kansas River and Missouri in what became Kansas City, Missouri. However, most reports place it on the bluffs above the confluence of Salt Creek and the Missouri River just north of Fort Leavenworth, Kansas. This is roughly in the same location as a major Kansa village. Lewis and Clark reported visiting this site on July 2, 1804:

The French formerly had a fort at this place, to protect the trade of this nation, the Situation appears to be a verry [sic] elligible [sic] one for a Town, the valley rich & extensive, with a Small Brook Meanding [sic] through it and one part of the bank affording yet a good landing for boats.

For decades, researchers, archaeologists, and scholars have "flown over [the area] in a helicopter, studied aerial photographs of it, driven around and over it, and walked over practically every square foot of it—and have found no definite trace of [the fort]." In 1987, the magazine Soldiers claimed that David L. Campbell, through the use of template mapping, had located foundations on a bluff that may have been the fort's remains. This claim was reiterated in 2012 by The Leavenworth Times. However, this claim has not been verified by archaeological evidence, and in 2004, the Kansas Historical Society claimed that the fort's exact location "remains as one of the active historical and archeological mysteries in Kansas."

== See also ==
- List of French forts in North America
