= Fort Trois-Rivières =

- Fort des Trois-Rivières
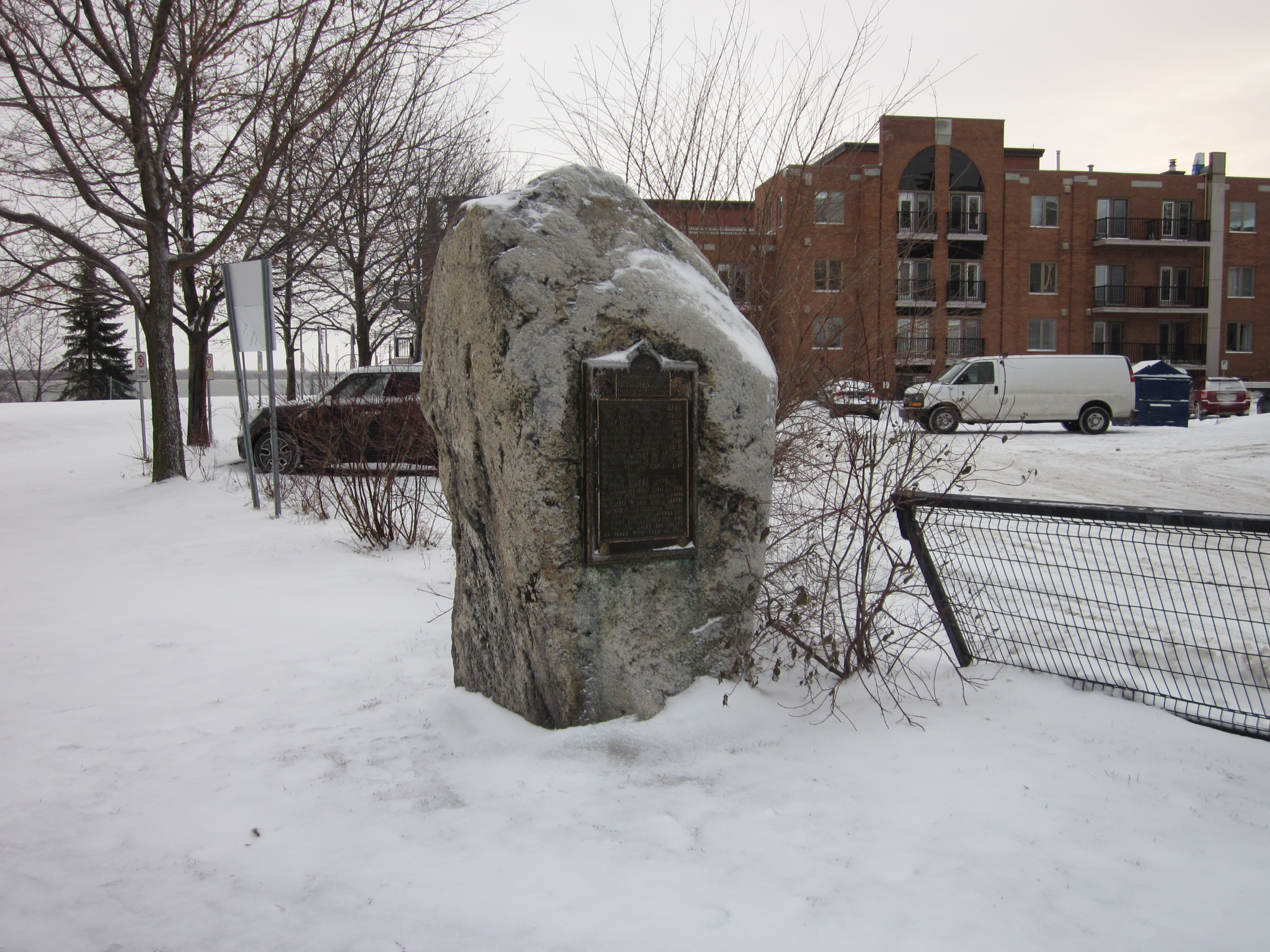
- The monument marking Fort Trois-Rivières.

- Location within Central Quebec

General information
- Type: Fort
- Location: Trois-Rivières, Quebec, Canada
- Coordinates: 46.341944°N 72.538611°W
- Construction started: 1634
- Completed: 1638
- Demolished: 1668

National Historic Site of Canada
- Official name: Fort Trois-Rivières National Historic Site of Canada
- Designated: 1920

Fort Trois-Rivières (French: Fort des Trois-Rivières) was a 17th-century wooden fort in New France. It was built between 1634 and 1638 by the Sieur de Laviolette.

The construction of a wooden fort on this site marked the second permanent settlement in New France and the foundation of the modern city of Trois-Rivières, Quebec, Canada. It was recognized as a National Historic Site of Canada on January 30, 1920.

It was protected by a palisade that repelled a large Iroquois attack in 1653 and was in use until 1668. It was demolished following a peace treaty signed with the Iroquois in 1668.

It was strengthened by the governor of New France, Louis d'Ailleboust de Coulonge, at the end of 1650. He gave very specific instructions for a more effective defence from attacks to the site's commander, Pierre Boucher. It was "saved from complete destruction as a result of the investments of 1653, by five hundred Mohawks."

== Commemorative plaque ==
A commemorative plaque is fixed to a large stone located south of the post office on des Casernes Street in what is today known as Platon Park. The perimeter of the fort is bounded by present-day streets of Saint-Pierre, Saint-Jean, Saint-Louis, des Casernes and Notre-Dame.
