= French ship Orignal =

Ship of the line of the French Navy

History

France
- Name: Orignal
- Namesake: Moose
- Builder: Chantier du Cul-de-Sac, Québec
- Laid down: Circa October 1748
- Launched: 2 September 1750
- Fate: Sank 2 September 1750

General characteristics
- Class & type: Saint Laurent-class ship of the line
- Displacement: 1900 tonneaux
- Tons burthen: 1000 port tonneaux
- Length: 47.1 m (155 ft)
- Beam: 12.8 m (42 ft)
- Draught: 6.4 m (21 ft)
- Propulsion: Sails
- Sail plan: Ship
- Armament: 62 guns: 24 × 24-pounder long guns; 26 × 12-pounder long guns; 12 × 6-pounder long guns

Orignal was a 62-gun Saint Laurent-class ship of the line of the French Navy, built by R.N. Levasseur. Her keel was laid down in March 1749 and she was launched in Québec on 2 September 1750.

Originally built as a 62-gun ship, she was intended to be upgraded to 72 guns. Built with poor quality timber, she broke in two halves and sank at her launch on 2 September 1750
