= Charles Fort (Barbados) =

Historic military fortification and UNESCO World Heritage Site in Bridgetown, Barbados

- Bridgetown, Barbados
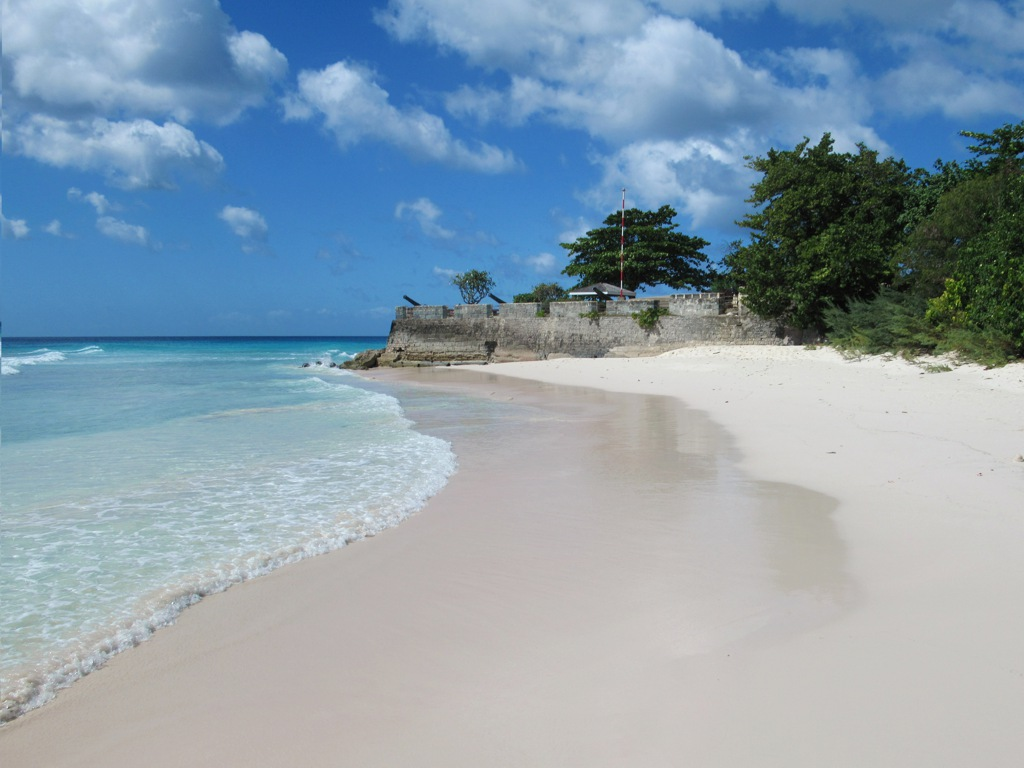
- Remains of Charles Fort

Site information
- Type: Fortification

Location
- Location within Barbados Charles Fort (the Caribbean)
- Coordinates: 13.0789°N 59.6127°W

Site history
- Built: 1650
- In use: No
- Materials: Stone

Charles Fort, originally Needham's Fort, is a historic military fortification and UNESCO World Heritage Site in Bridgetown, Barbados. It was originally built in 1650, and rebuilt in 1811. It is located at Needham's Point on the southwestern side of the island, overlooking Carlisle Bay. Today, the fort is located on the grounds of the Hilton Barbados Resort.

== History ==
In 1650, a fort was constructed at Needham's Point (called Needham's Fort) to protect Carlisle Bay and Bridgetown from enemy attacks. The English Civil War had just ended, and Barbados feared attacks by the British. Oliver Cromwell had just overthrown the British monarchy, but Barbados remained loyal to the royalists and acknowledged the exiled Charles II as King.

In 1651, Needham's Fort helped the local militia in prevent the successful landing of Cromwell’s troops, commanded by George Ayscue. This event resulted in the Charter of Barbados (or Treaty of Oistins) in 1652, which ended the fighting between Barbados and the English Commonwealth. In 1660, when Charles II was reinstated to the British throne, the fort was renamed Charles Fort.

In 1665, Charles Fort successfully defended Barbados from surprise attack by the Dutch, commanded by Michiel De Ruyter. The attack was the closest a foreign power ever came to invading Barbados.

In the 1740s, the fort was further fortified. It was rebuilt in stone and two additional batteries were added on each side.

George Washington visited Fort Charles during his visit to Barbados in 1751-1752. He dined with the Captain at the fort multiple times during his six weeks in Barbados. Charles Fort and Saint Ann's Fort were the first military forts that Washington had ever seen.

The fort was property of the Colony of Barbados until 1836, when it was acquired by the Crown. It was decommissioned in 1905.

In 1966, the remains of the fort were stabilized during the construction of the original Hilton Hotel in Barbados. In 2004, with construction of the Hilton Barbados Resort, additional preservation and restoration measures were undertaken.
