= French frigate Abénaquise =

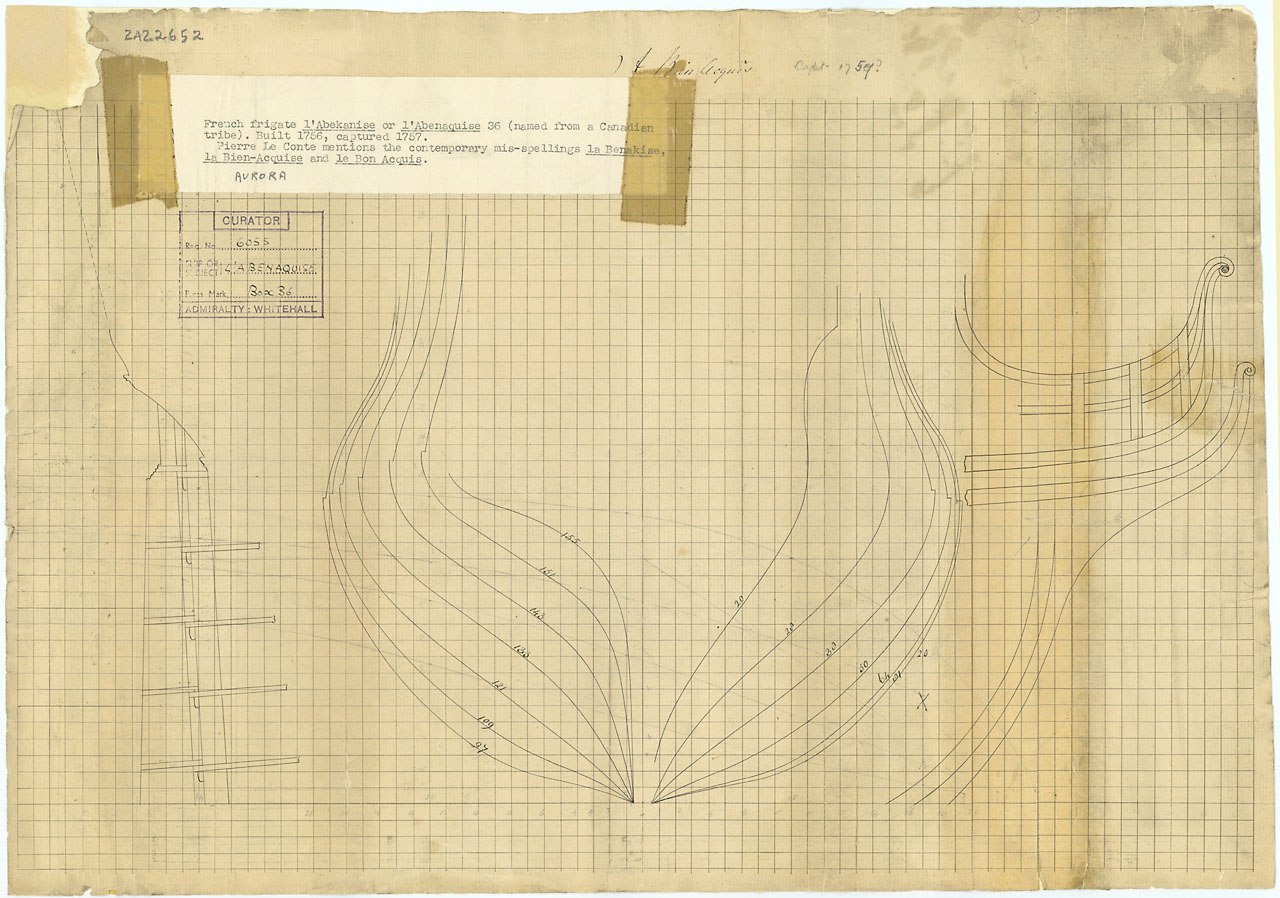
- Aurora

History

France
- Name: Abénaquise
- Builder: Designed by René-Nicholas Lavasseur
- Laid down: August 1753
- Launched: June 1756 in Quebec
- In service: 1756–1757
- Captured: 1757

Great Britain
- Name: HMS Aurora
- Acquired: 23 November 1757
- Commissioned: October 1758
- In service: 1758–1763
- Fate: Broken up at Plymouth Dockyard, 1763

General characteristics
- Class & type: 38-gun fifth rate
- Tons burthen: 946 374/94 (bm)
- Length: 144 ft 0 in (43.89 m) (gundeck); 118 ft 9 in (36.20 m) (keel)
- Beam: 38 ft 8.5 in (11.798 m)
- Depth of hold: 15 ft 2 in (4.62 m)
- Sail plan: Full-rigged ship
- Complement: 250
- Armament: 38 guns comprising; Upper deck: 28 × 12-pounder cannons; Lower deck: 8 × 18-pounder cannons; Quarterdeck 2 × 6-pounder cannons

Abénaquise (or Abénakise) was a 36-gun ship of the French Navy of the Ancien Régime, designed by René-Nicholas Lavasseur and launched in June 1756. She was commanded by captain Gabriel Pellegrin. In 1757 she crossed the Atlantic Ocean in 38 days. This was one of the fastest crossings from Brest to Petite ferme on the Côte de Beaupré with pilot Pellegrin, port captain of Quebec, who was on his forty-second crossing.

Captured by the Royal Navy in 1757, she was renamed HMS Aurora and saw active service in the latter half of the Seven Years' War. She was broken up for timber at Plymouth Dockyard in 1763.

== French Navy career 1756–1757 ==
Abénaquise or Abenakise was built in Quebec and launched in 1756.

== Royal Navy career 1757–1763 ==
In 1757 she was captured by HMS Chichester and brought into Portsmouth Harbour as a prize ship. On Admiralty's order she was purchased by the Royal Navy on 8 January 1758, for a sum of £6,103.11s for the hull and £425.4s for the masts and internal fittings. She was renamed HMS Aurora on 22 June, and commissioned into the Royal Navy in October 1758 under Captain Samuel Scott. Her 250-man crew comprised four commissioned officers – a captain and three lieutenants – overseeing 49 warrant and petty officers, 117 naval ratings, 44 Marines and 36 servants and other ranks. (Note: The 29 "servants and other ranks" provided for in the ship's complement were personal servants and clerical staff, assistant carpenters, an assistant sailmaker and five widow's men. Unlike naval ratings, servants and other ranks took no part in the sailing or handling of the ship.) Among these other ranks were five positions reserved for widow's men – fictitious crew members whose pay was intended to be reallocated to the families of sailors who died at sea.

Aurora's first Royal Navy duties were as a troop transport, ferrying British soldiers from England to Gibraltar ahead of an expected French or Spanish assault. Thereafter, she was sailed for Havre de Grace, Maryland in search of French privateers. However there were concerns about her seaworthiness and she was returned to England in 1760 to undergo two successive naval surveys. No repairs were carried out, and instead Aurora was paid off in 1761 and her crew dispersed to other ships.

The vessel was recommissioned in 1762 under Captain Raby Vane and assigned to coastal patrols and cruising in English home waters and off the coast of France. She was again the subject of a naval survey, in December 1762, and was removed from active service in the same month. At the conclusion of the Seven Years' War in 1763, she was disassembled at Plymouth Dockyard and her timbers sold for £152.5s.
