= List of battles with most Italian military fatalities =

This article contains a list of battles and military campaigns with most Italian military deaths.

== Introduction ==
This article lists battles and campaigns in which the number of Italian military fatalities exceed 1,000. The term casualty in warfare refers to a soldier who is no longer fit to fight being in combat. Casualties can include killed, wounded, missing, captured or deserted.

In this article the numbers of killed refer to those killed in action, killed by disease, missing presumed dead, or someone who died from their wounds.

== Battles ==
Battle or siege	Conflict	Date	Estimated number killed	Opposing force	References
Battle of Stalingrad	World War II	July 17, 1942 to February 2, 1943	84,830 killed	Soviet Union	
Tenth Battle of the Isonzo	World War I	May 12 to June 8, 1917	35,000 killed	Austria-Hungary	
Eleventh Battle of the Isonzo	World War I	August 18 to September 12, 1917	30,000 killed	Austria-Hungary (German Empire) Germany	
Third Battle of the Isonzo	World War I	October 18 to November 4, 1915	20,000 killed (Note: Estimates range from 10,733 to 20,000 killed)	Austria-Hungary	
Battle of Caporetto	World War I	October 24 to November 19, 1917	13,000 killed	Austria-Hungary (German Empire) Germany	
Second Battle of the Piave River	World War I	June 15 to 23, 1918	8,396 killed	Austria-Hungary	
Fourth Battle of the Isonzo	World War I	November 10 to December 2, 1915	7,500 killed	Austria-Hungary	
Battle of Vittorio Veneto	World War I	October 24 to November 4, 1918	7,000 killed	Austria-Hungary	
Battle of Gorizia (1916)	World War I	August 4 to August 16, 1916	6,310 killed	Austria-Hungary	
Battle of Adwa	First Italo-Ethiopian War	March 1, 1896	6,000 killed	(Ethiopian Empire) Ethiopia	
Battle of Gela (1943)	World War II	July 10, 1943 to July 12, 1943	3,350 killed	United States; United Kingdom	
Battle of Keren	World War II	February 3, 1941 to March 27, 1941	3,000 killed (Note: Estimates range from 1,135 (Note: Mackenzie) to 3,000 killed)	British Empire; United Kingdom (British Raj) India (Anglo-Egyptian Sudan) Sudan; Free France	
Battle of Guadalajara	Spanish Civil War	March 8 to 23, 1937	3,000 killed (Note: Estimates range from 600 to 3,000 killed)	(Second Spanish Republic) Spanish Republic; International Brigades	
Battle of Cape Matapan	World War II	March 28 to 29, 1941	2,331 killed	United Kingdom; Australia	
Battle of Sidi Barrani	World War II	December 3, 1940 to December 5, 1940	2,194 killed	United Kingdom; Australia; Free France	
Siege of Sevastopol (1854–1855)	Crimean War	October 17, 1854 to September 11, 1855	2,050 killed	(Russian Empire) Russia (Kingdom of Greece) Greek Volunteer Legion	
Battle of Bardia	World War II	January 3 to January 5, 1941	1,703 killed	Australia; United Kingdom	
Battle of Amba Alagi (1895)	First Italo-Ethiopian War	December 7, 1895	1,539 killed	(Ethiopian Empire) Ethiopia	
Battle of Flondar	World War I	June 3 to 6, 1917	1,400 killed	Austria-Hungary	
Battle of Novara (1849)	First Italian War of Independence	March 23, 1849	1,378 killed	(Austrian Empire) Austria	
Siege of Tobruk	World War II	April 10, 1941 to November 27, 1941	1,130 killed	Australia; United Kingdom; Poland; Czechoslovakia	
Siege of Brescia (Note: Also known as the Ten Days of Brescia)	First Italian War of Independence	March 23 to April 1, 1849	1,016 killed (Note: Including civilians and 16 people who were executed)	(Austrian Empire) Austria	

== Campaigns ==
Campaign	Conflict	Date	Estimated number killed	Opposing force	References
Battles of the Isonzo	World War I	May 24, 1915 to October 27, 1917	300,000 killed	Austria-Hungary (German Empire) Germany (1917)	
Operation Achse	World War II	September 8 to September 23, 1943	30,000 killed	(Nazi Germany) Germany (Independent State of Croatia) Croatia (Kingdom of Romania) Romania	
North African campaign	World War II	June 11, 1940 to May 13, 1943	22,341 killed	United Kingdom (British Raj) India (Dominion of Newfoundland) Newfoundland; Free France; Australia; New Zealand (Union of South Africa) South Africa; United States (Polish government-in-exile) Poland (Greek government-in-exile) Greece (Czechoslovak government-in-exile) Czechoslovakia	
German invasion of Greece (Note: Also known as the (Operation Marita)) (part of the Balkans campaign)	World War II	April 6, 1941 to June 1, 1941	19,755 killed (Note: Statistics about the strength and casualties of Italy and Greece refer to both the Greco-Italian War and the Battle of Greece (at least 300,000 Greek soldiers fought in Albania).)	(Kingdom of Greece) Greece; United Kingdom; Australia; New Zealand	
East African campaign	World War II	June 10, 1940 to November 27, 1941	16,966 killed (Note: 5,511 Italians and 11,455 colonial troops from Italian East Africa)	United Kingdom; British Raj; Australia (Dominion of New Zealand) New Zealand (Union of South Africa) South Africa; Kenya (Anglo-Egyptian Sudan); Nigeria (Gold Coast (British colony)) Gold Coast; British Somaliland; Northern Rhodesia; Southern Rhodesia; Uganda; Nyasaland (Ethiopian Empire) Ethiopia; Belgium (Belgian Congo) Congo; Free France	
Battle of Asiago (Note: Also known as the Südtirol Offensive (South Tyrol Offensive))	World War I	May 15 to July 27, 1916	15,453 killed	Austria-Hungary	
Senussi campaign	World War I	November 1915 to February 1917	5,600 killed	Senussi Order; Ottoman Empire	
Operation Compass (part of the Western Desert campaign and the North African campaign)	World War II	December 12, 1940 to February 9, 1941	Over 5,500 killed	United Kingdom (British Raj) India; Southern Rhodesia; Australia; Free France	
Allied invasion of Sicily (part of the Italian campaign)	World War II	July 9, 1943 to August 17, 1943	4,678 killed	United States; United Kingdom; Canada; Free France; Australia	
Tunisian campaign (part of the North African campaign)	World War II	November 17, 1942 to May 13, 1943	3,700 killed	United Kingdom (British Raj) India (Dominion of Newfoundland) Newfoundland; Free France; Australia; New Zealand (Union of South Africa) South Africa; United States (Greek government-in-exile) Greece	
Macedonian front (part of the Balkan campaign)	World War I	October 21, 1915 to September 30, 1918	~3,269 killed (Note: 2,971 dead or missing in Macedonia and 298 dead in Albania between 1916 and 1918)	Bulgaria (German Empire) Germany; Austria-Hungary; Ottoman Empire	
Christmas Offensive	Second Italo-Ethiopian War	December 8, 1935 to January 20, 1936	3,000 killed	(Ethiopian Empire) Ethiopia	
Operation Weiss (part of the Yugoslav Front)	World War II	January 20 to March 1943	1,605 killed	Yugoslav Partisans	
Italian invasion of Libya	Italo-Turkish War	September 29, 1911 to October 18, 1912	1,430 killed	Ottoman Empire; Senussi Order	

== See also ==
- List of battles with most French military fatalities
