= Fort Jacques-Cartier =

Fort Jacques-Cartier de Cap Santé (Québec)
- Cap-Santé, Quebec
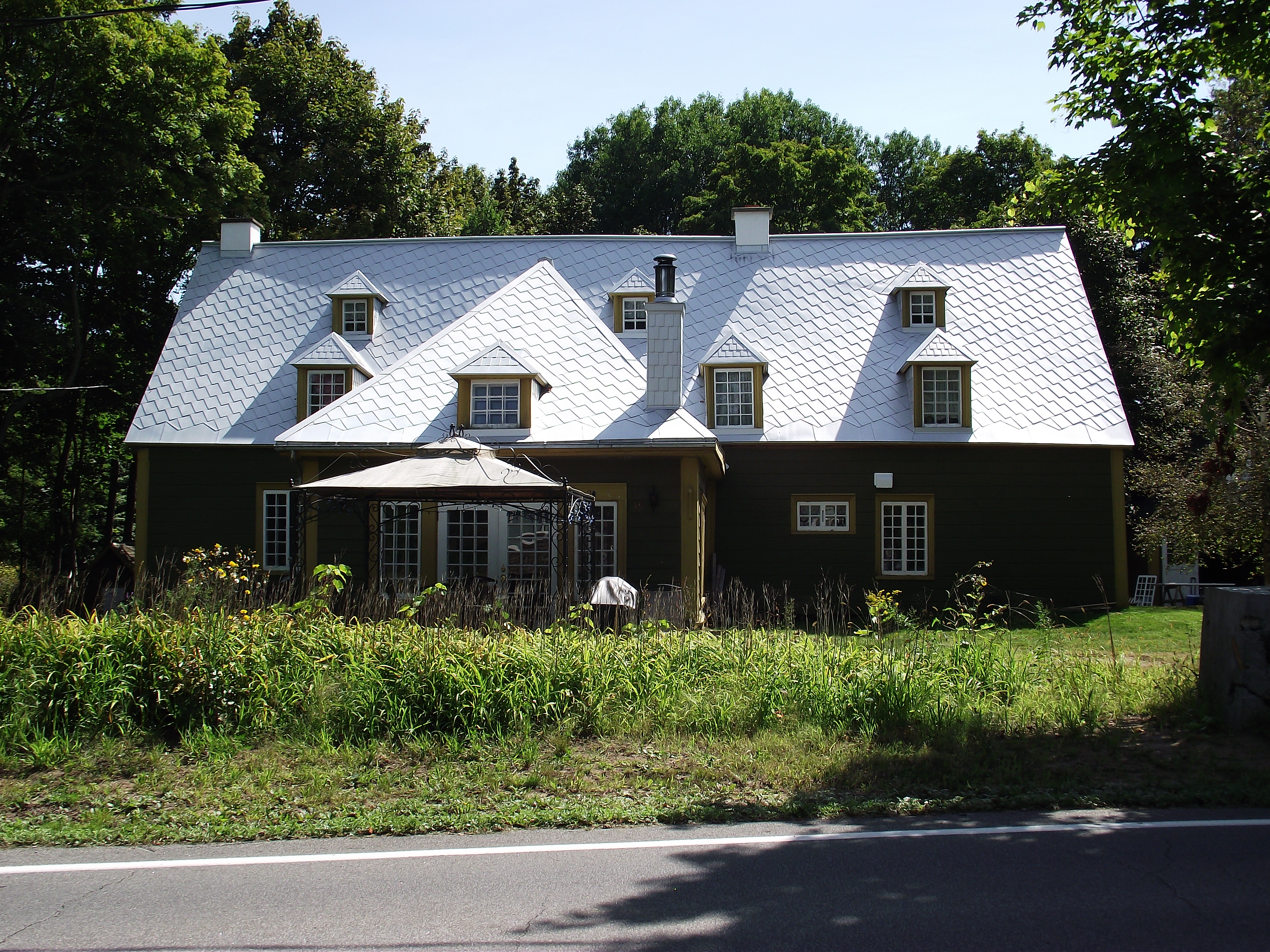
- Manoir Alsopp located at the site of Fort Jacques-Cartier

Site information
- Type: Fort

Location
- Coordinates: 46.67354°N 71.751881°W

Site history
- Built: 1759

Fort Jacques-Cartier de Cap Sante was a fort on the north shore of the St Lawrence River approximately 30km southwest of Quebec City. The fort was constructed by French Canadians after the Battle of the Plains of Abraham and the taking of Quebec by the British army in 1759. It was constructed on land conceded to Adrien Pichet (died 1739) who built a house along the Chemin du Roy on a promontory overlooking the St Lawrence River. This location is now part of the village of Cap-Sante.

== History ==
The choice of this location behind the Jacques-Cartier River was meant to block any aggression by the British towards Trois-Rivieres by the English garrison newly established at Quebec. Jean-Daniel Dumas received orders from Chevalier de Lévis to build the fort, and commenced construction with a group of 600 soldiers. The Fort defined the southern border between the British occupied zone and the Canadian militias organized in each parish. Members of these militias were obliged to take an oath of loyalty to the king of England in order to obtain a passport to traverse the border legally.

In 1759-1760, the Fort served as winter quarters as well as an armory for the French army staying nearby to Quebec and preparing a counteroffensive for the spring of 1760 (the Battle_of_Sainte-Foy). The British captured the fort in September 1760 and kept a garrison there until 1763 after which they abandoned it. It was the only fort built by the French during the Seven Years' War.

A larger house, now known as Manoir Alsopp (Alsopp Manor) was constructed at the site beginning in 1830. The Fort and the house were together classified as a historic site in 1978. The Alsopp family owned the house and fort location continuously until 1998. While the Manor remains, no parts of the fort are still visible today.
