= Fort de la Montagne =

- Montreal, Quebec
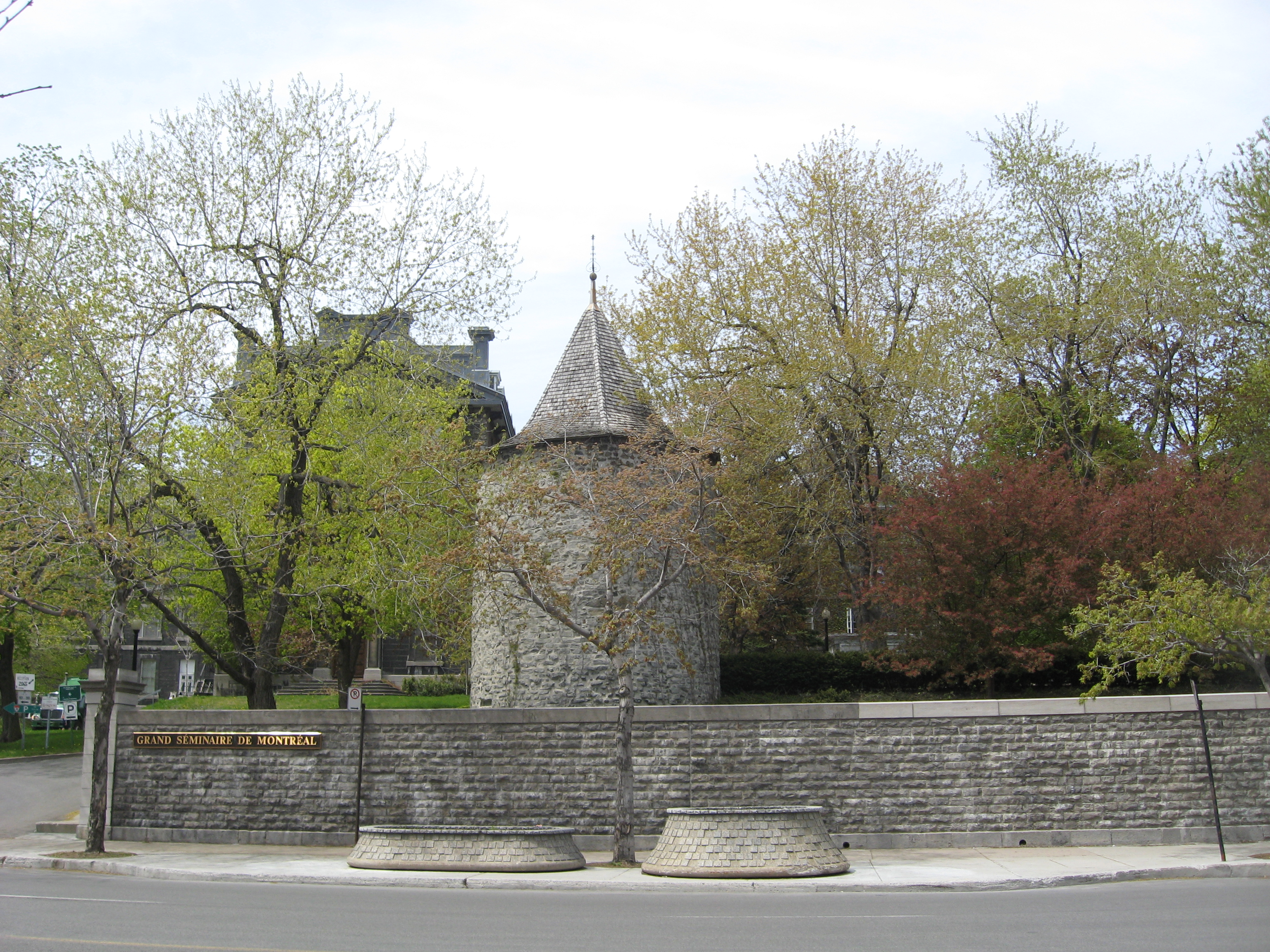
- Image of fort in front of Collège de Montréal

Site information
- Type: Fort
- Controlled by: New France: Quebec

Location
- Coordinates: 45.4938°N 73.5846°W

Site history
- Built: 1685
- In use: 1685-1854

National Historic Site of Canada
- Official name: Sulpician Towers / Fort de la Montagne National Historic Site of Canada
- Designated: 1970

Patrimoine culturel du Québec
- Type: Historic monument
- Designated: 1974

The Fort de la Montagne (also called Fort des Messieurs or Fort Belmont) was an old fortification, the remaining structures of which are located on Sherbrooke Street in Montreal, Quebec, Canada. The fort was constructed in 1685 and parts of it were demolished in the mid 19th century. Two 13-metre (43 ft) high stone towers, built in 1694 as bastions of the fort, still remain and are among the oldest structures on the Island of Montreal.

The towers were designated a National Historic Site of Canada in 1970.

== History ==
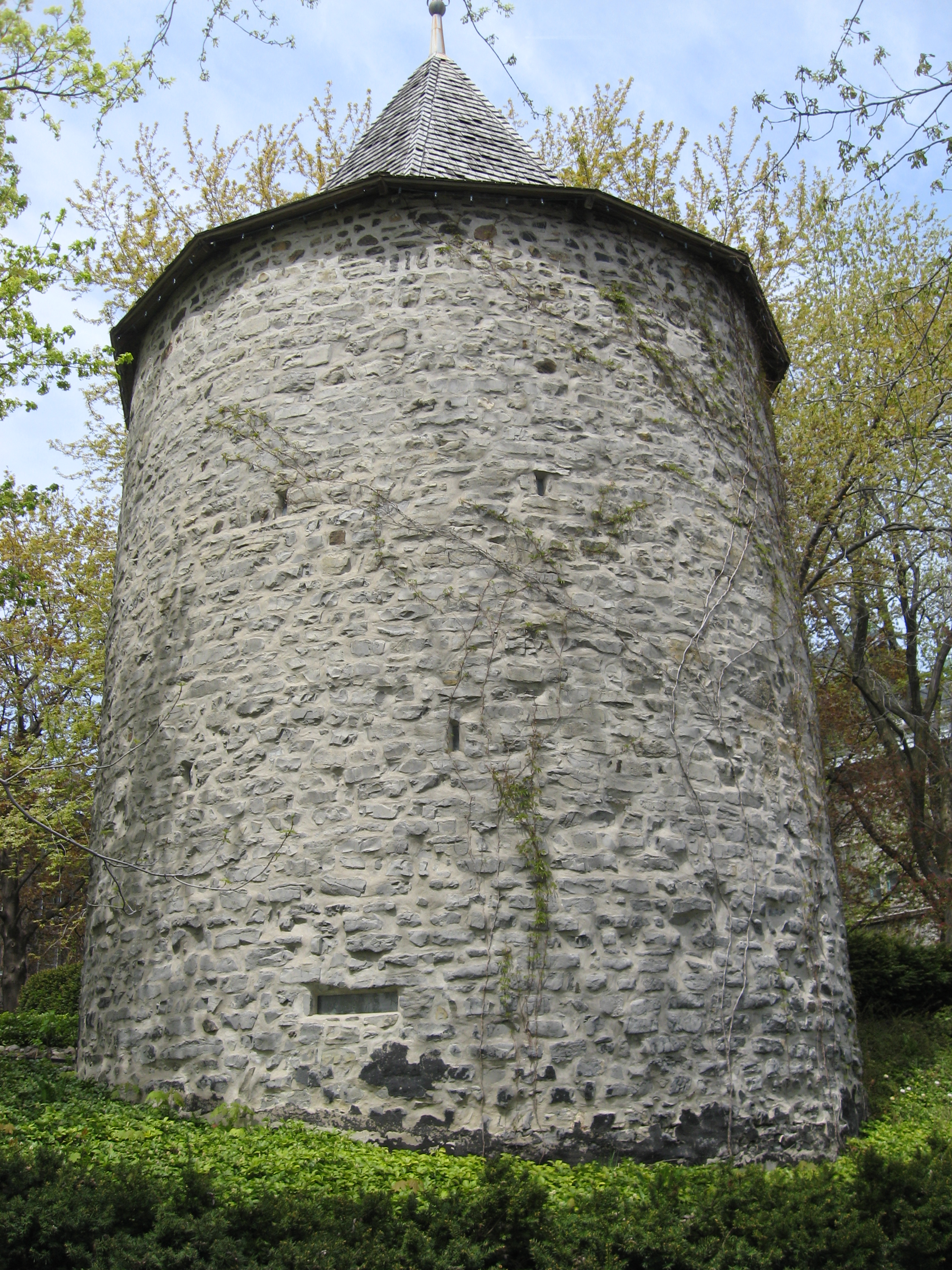
The vestiges of one of the remaining towers, located opposite Collège de Montréal.

The mission to Christianize the native people was established in 1675 at the foot of Mont-Royal mountain. François Vachon de Belmont was sent to New France towards 1680 by his superiors, order of Saint-Sulpice priests in Paris to stop the spread of witchcraft and visions at the mission. In 1683, 210 natives, (Haudenosaunee, Wendat and Algonquins) lived on the site. To protect the mission from the Haudenosaunee, a fort was constructed in 1685.

In the two decades of its existence, the brandy trade had increased significantly and the missionaries found it necessary to relocate their neophytes and catechumens farther from the drunkenness and seduction of the cities. In 1696, the inhabitants were moved to the other side of the island, to Fort Lorette at Sault-au-Recollet. The mission at de la Montagne was closed in 1705: the grounds were rented to the local peasants, and some would live in the fortifications. In 1825, a floor is added to the main residence of château des Messieurs and a chapel is built in one of the towers.

The fort contained four bastions and a series of ramparts and palisades, which were all destroyed in 1854 except for the two southern towers, during the building of the College of Montreal.

Three bastions were constructed in the domaine of the Sulpicians: the first when the bastions were built in 1675.

In 1984 to 1986, restoration work was undertaken on the two remaining towers. The towers were classified as provincial historical monuments in 1974. In 1982, the towers were included in the Domaine des Messieurs-de-Saint-Sulpice historic site.

== See also ==
- List of French forts in North America
