= French ship Algonquin (1753) =

Ship of the line of the French Navy

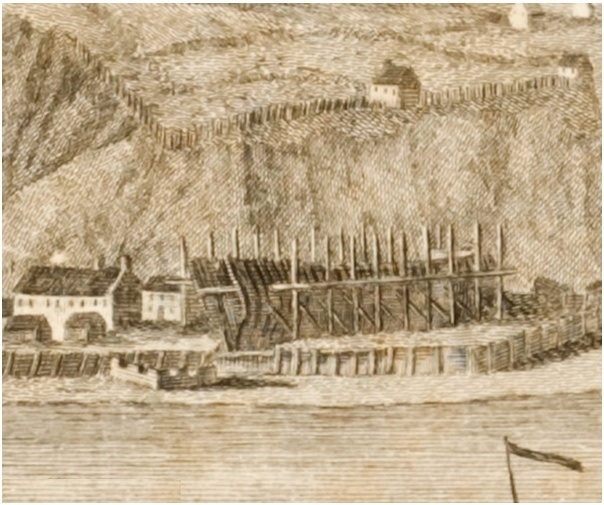
- The Algonquin under construction

History

France
- Name: Algonquin
- Builder: Québec City
- Laid down: March 1752
- Launched: 9 June 1753
- Completed: 8 January 1754
- Stricken: 1772
- Fate: Broken up in 1773

General characteristics
- Class & type: Third-rate ship of the line
- Length: 55.1 m (180 ft 9 in)
- Beam: 14.1 m (46 ft 3 in)
- Depth: 6.8 m (22 ft 4 in)
- Sail plan: Full-rigged ship
- Armament: 74 guns

Algonquin was a 74-gun ship of the line of the French Navy. She was launched from Québec City in (New France), on 9 June 1753 and placed into service on 8 January 1754.

In 1755, she was placed into service for the transportation of nine companies of the régiment de la Reine who embarked in Brest on 14 April 1755. The 74-gun ship was armed en flûte with 24 guns to allow for more room for the soldiers. The ship was commanded by Captain Jean Baptiste François de La Villéon. The regiment was also reduced to 360 soldiers. Algonquin was part of the naval squadron that left for Canada. She became separated from the other ships after the departure on 29 May, because of heavy fog at sea.

== See also ==
- Military of New France
- History of the French Navy
