= The Citadel, Montreal =

Coordinates: 45°30′42″N 73°33′06″W

- Montreal, Quebec, Canada
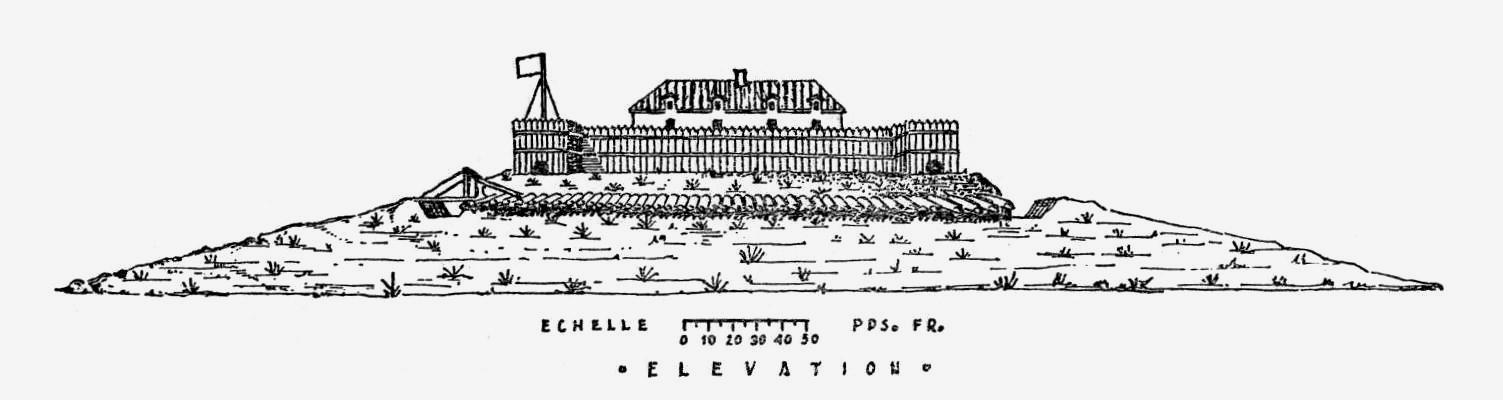

Site information
- Type: fortress used to defend the city

Site history
- Built: 1690

The Citadel of Montreal was a former fortress used to defend the city. It was located at what is now rue Notre-Dame between rue Bonsecours and rue Berri.

Smaller than the one in Old Quebec, the Citadel was built by the French in 1690 replacing the 1658 redoubt at Pointe-à-Callière. It consisted of a barrack structure surrounded by wood stakes palisade and located on a hill along the city's fortification wall. A cannon battery added in 1723.

The fort was demolished by the British in 1821 to allow for the extension of Notre-Dame Street.

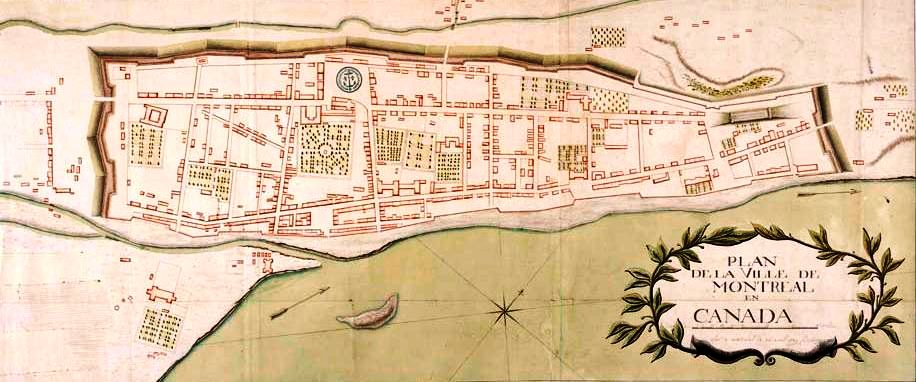
The Citadel is in this map of Montreal, 1749. Inside the walls, the long rectangle in relief, at north-east corner

== See also ==
- Old Montreal
