= Fort Saint Jacques =

- Waskaganish, Québec

Site information
- Type: Fort
- Controlled by: New France

Location
- Coordinates: 51°29′20″N 78°45′07″W

Site history
- Built: 1668
- In use: 1668-1713
- Battles/wars: 1686

Garrison information
- Past commanders: Pierre LeMoyne d'Iberville
- Garrison: Brouillan

Fort Saint Jacques, Fort Rupert, or Fort Charles was a fur trading post on James Bay at the mouth of the Rupert River. It was located in what is now Waskaganish, Quebec, Canada.

Fort Charles was founded in 1668 in what is now Nord-du-Québec on the James Bay, at the mouth of the Rupert River. It was the first Hudson's Bay Company post by the Médard des Groseilliers. It was the first European settlement in northern Canada. The fort was captured by the French in 1686, and remained under their control until 1713 and was then called Fort Saint Jacques. When returned to English control, it became Rupert House, and later Fort Rupert.

== See also ==
- Treaty of Utrecht
- Treaty of Ryswick
