= List of towns and villages in New France =

This article presents a list of towns and villages in New France. These towns and villages were or are still located throughout the former North American colonies of France.

New France had five colonies or territories, each with its own administration: Canada (the Great Lakes region, the Ohio Valley, and the St. Lawrence River Valley), Acadia (the Gaspé Peninsula, New Brunswick, Nova Scotia, St. John's Island, and Île Royale-Cape Breton), Hudson Bay (and James Bay), Terre-Neuve (south Newfoundland), and Louisiana;.

- Acadie (1604–1713) —(areas Port Royal, Île-Royale, Île Saint-Jean, New Brunswick, and Maine)
- Canada (1608–1763) —(districts, Québec, Trois-Rivières, and Montreal; areas Pays d'en Haut, and Domaine du roy)
- Hudson Bay —(Hudson Bay conflicts 17th and 18th centuries)
- Terre-Neuve (1662–1713)
- Louisiana (1682–1763, 1801–1803) —(district, Illinois Country; area, Ohio Country)

== Acadia ==
- Beaubassin
- Cobequid
- Pisiguit
- Port-Royal
- Grand-Pré

== Canada ==
- Beauport
- Charlesbourg
- Kamouraska
- L'Assomption
- Montmagny
- Montreal
- Québec
- Tadoussac
- Trois-Rivières
- Varennes
- Verchères

== Upper Country (Pays d'en Haut) ==
- Détroit
- La Baye
- Sainte-Marie among the Hurons
- Saint-Ignace
- Sault-Sainte-Marie

== Louisiana ==
- Baton Rouge
- Biloxi
- Cahokia
- Kaskaskia
- La Vieille Mine
- Mine à Breton
- Mobile
- Natchitoches
- New Orleans
- Prairie du Chien
- Prairie du Rocher
- Saint Philippe
- St. Louis
- Ste-Geneviève
- Vincennes

== Royal Island ==
- Arichat
- Baie de Glace
- Louisbourg
- Petit-de-Grat

== Isle Saint John ==
- Port-LaJoye

== French Coast of Newfoundland ==
- Miquelon
- Plaisance
- Saint-Pierre
