= Canada (New France) =

French colony in North America from 1534 to 1763

- 1534–1763
- The royal banner of early modern France or "Bourbon Flag" was the most commonly used flag in New France The lesser coat of arms of France as used by the Government
- Anthem: Marche Henri IV ("March of Henri IV")
- Map of Canada after 1713. At its fullest extent, Canada extended from south of the Great Lakes to the Gulf of St Lawrence.
- Status: Colony of France within New France (1534–1760); Under British military occupation (1760–1763)
- Capital: Quebec
- Official languages: French
- Religion: Catholic Church (state religion)
- Government: Monarchy
- King
  - 1534–1547: Francis I (first)
  - 1715–1763: Louis XV (last)
- Viceroy/Governor General
  - 1541–1543: Jean-François Roberval (first)
  - 1755–1763: Pierre de Rigaud (last)
- History
  - French territorial possession: 1534
  - Founding of Quebec: 1608
  - Founding of Trois-Rivières: 1634
  - Founding of Montreal: 1642
  - Treaty of Paris: 10 February 1763
  - Royal Proclamation: 7 October 1763

Population
  - 1740 survey: 48,500
- Currency: New France livre
Preceded by	Succeeded by
Aboriginal peoples in Canada	Province of Quebec (1763–1791)
- Today part of: Canada; United States

Canada was a French colony within New France. It was claimed by France in 1534 during the first voyage of Jacques Cartier in the name of the French king, Francis I. The colony remained a French territory until 1763, when it became a British colony known as the Province of Quebec at the end of the global Seven Years' War.

In the 16th century the word Canada could refer to the territory along the Saint Lawrence River (then known as the Canada River) from Grosse Isle to a point between Québec and Trois-Rivières. The terms "Canada" and "New France" were also used interchangeably. French explorations continued west "unto the Countreys of Canada, Hochelaga, and Saguenay" before any permanent settlements were established. In 1600, a permanent trading post and habitation was established at Tadoussac at the confluence of the Saguenay and Saint Lawrence rivers. However, because this trading post was under a trade monopoly, it was not constituted as an official French colonial settlement.

The first official settlement of Canada was Québec, founded by Samuel de Champlain in 1608. The other four colonies within New France were Hudson's Bay to the north, Acadia and Newfoundland to the east, and Louisiana far to the south. Canada became the most developed of the five colonies of New France. It was divided into three districts, Québec, Trois-Rivières, and Montreal, each with its own government. The governor of the District of Quebec also served as the governor-general for all of New France.

The Seven Years' War of 1756–1763 saw Great Britain defeat the French and their allies, and take possession of Canada. In the Treaty of Paris of 1763, which formally ended the Seven Years' War, France ceded Canada in exchange for other colonies, with a large portion of Canada becoming the British colony of the Province of Quebec.

== Territorial evolution ==
In the 240 years between Verrazano's voyage of exploration in 1524 and the Conquest of New France in 1763, the French marked the North American continent in many ways. Whether it was through by land distribution and clearing, the establishment of villages and towns, deploying a network of roads and paths or developing the territory with various constructions, the French colonists transformed and adapted the environments according to their needs.

There are three major periods of expansion of the territory of Canada, mostly as a result of exploration efforts. First, the 1534–1603 period, in which Canada's territory comprised the coasts of Newfoundland, the entirety of St John's Island, the Saint Lawrence River and the Gulf of Saint Lawrence, and lands that later became Nova Scotia and the coasts of New Brunswick.

Then 1603–1673, in which, due to westward expansion and conflicts with Great Britain, Canada's territory was composed of the coasts of the Saint Lawrence River, of the Gulf of Saint Lawrence and of the Great Lakes, as well as lands that later became southern Ontario and northern New England.

Then, in the last period of 1673–1741, Canada's territory was composed of the coasts of the Saint Lawrence River, of the Gulf of Saint Lawrence and of the Great Lakes, and lands that later became southern Ontario, southern Manitoba, the north-eastern US Midwest, and part of the Upland South. It was in this period that Canada was at its largest.

=== Pays d'en Haut ===
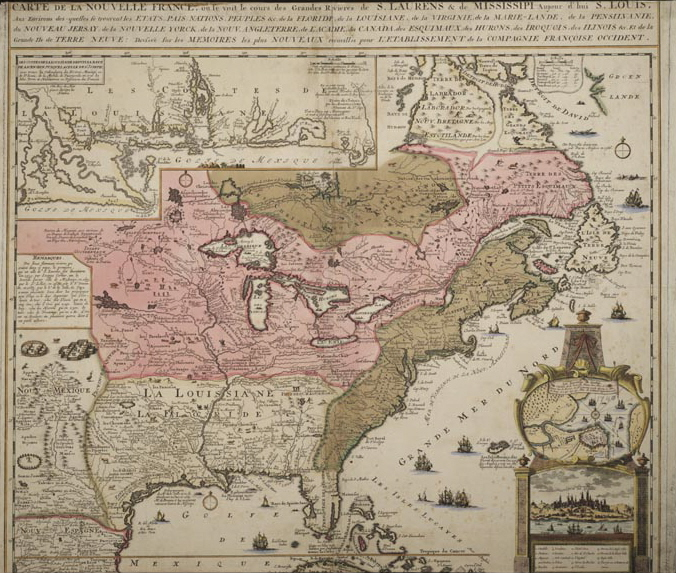
Lower Louisiana marked in yellow; pink represents Canada. Part of Canada south of the Great Lakes was ceded to Louisiana in 1717. Brown represents British colonies. Original map from 1719

Dependent on Canada were the Pays d'en Haut (upper countries), a vast territory north and west of Montreal, covering the whole of the Great Lakes and stretching as far into the North American continent as the French had explored. Before 1717, when it ceded territory to the new colony of Louisiana, it stretched as far south as the Illinois Country. In the Great Lakes area, a mission, Sainte-Marie among the Hurons, was established in 1639. Following the destruction of the Huron homeland in 1649 by the Iroquois, the French destroyed the mission themselves and left the area. In what are today Ontario and the eastern prairies, various trading posts and forts were built such as Fort Kaministiquia in 1679 (at modern Thunder Bay, Ontario), Fort Frontenac in 1673 (today's Kingston, Ontario), Fort Saint Pierre in 1731 (near modern Fort Frances, Ontario), Fort Saint Charles in 1732 (on Lake of the Woods located on Magnusens Island on the Northwest Angle of Minnesota) and Fort Rouillé in 1750 (today's Toronto). The mission and trading post at Sault Ste. Marie (1688) would later be split by the Canada–US border.

The French settlements in the Pays d'en Haut among and south of the Great Lakes were Fort Niagara (1678) (near modern Youngstown, New York), Fort Crevecoeur (1680) (near the present site of Creve Coeur, Illinois, a suburb of Peoria, Illinois), Fort Saint Antoine (1686) (on Lake Pepin in Wisconsin), Fort St. Joseph (1691) (on the southernmost point of St. Joseph Island, Ontario on Lake Huron), Fort Pontchartrain du Détroit (1701) (today's Detroit, Michigan), Fort Michilimackinac (1715) (on the Straits of Mackinac at Mackinaw City, Michigan), Fort Miami (1715) (modern Fort Wayne, Indiana), Fort La Baye (1717) (today's Green Bay, Wisconsin), and Fort Beauharnois (1727) (in Florence Township, Goodhue County, Minnesota).

Today, the term Les Pays-d'en-Haut refers to a regional county municipality in the Laurentides region of the present Province of Quebec, north of Montreal, while the former Pays d'en Haut was part of the District of Montreal.

=== Domaine du roy ===
The Domaine du roy, established in 1652, was a vast region of New France, which stretched north from the St. Lawrence River to Hudson Bay. It was located between the eastern limit of the seigneurie of Les Éboulements and Cape Cormorant. The territory had an area of more than 460,000 km^{2}. After the Conquest of New France, the territory's name was changed to Rupert's Land.

== Population surveys ==
A population survey was done in 1740 to estimate Canada's population. The survey of the Saint Lawrence River valley counted about 44,000 colonists in total. The majority of them were born in Canada and lived in a rural environment. Of the colonists, 18,000 lived under the Government of Québec, 4,000 under the Government of Trois-Rivières and 22,000 under the Government of Montreal. As for colonists not living in the Saint Lawrence River valley, Île Royale (now Cape Breton) counted 4,000 inhabitants (of which 1,500 were in Louisbourg), and Île Saint-Jean (now Prince Edward Island) had 500 inhabitants.

== Successors and legacy ==
In 1791, the Province of Quebec was separated into Lower Canada (now Quebec) and Upper Canada (now Ontario). Lower Canada and Upper Canada were fused into the Province of Canada in 1841, before separating again into the modern-day provinces of Quebec and Ontario during the Confederation of Canada in 1867. Because of the historical and geographical continuity, as well as the continued use of the French language, civil law, customs, cultural aspects and the ruling power of the Catholic Church in government until the Quiet Revolution of the 1960s, the province of Quebec is considered by many to be the modern-day continuation of the Canada colony of New France.

Still today, the majority of the Quebec population is descended from the original French-speaking Canadien of Canada, and the cultural distinctiveness of Quebec from the rest of the country has led to the emergence of a Québécois identity and the Quebec sovereignty movement.

Descendants of the original Canadien of Canada (New France) living outside of Quebec are now often referred to by a name which references their province of residence (ex. Franco-Ontarian). Francophone populations in the Maritime provinces, however, are more likely to be descended from the settlers of the French colony of Acadia. They are therefore called Acadians.

== See also ==
- Former colonies and territories in Canada
- Illinois Country
- Monarchs of Canadian territories
- Territorial evolution of Canada – after 1867
- Quebec
- History of Quebec
- Timeline of Quebec history
