= Pays d'en Haut =

1610–1763 territory of New France

Coordinates: 45.550°N 78.574°W

- Territory of New France
- 1610–1763
- Flag

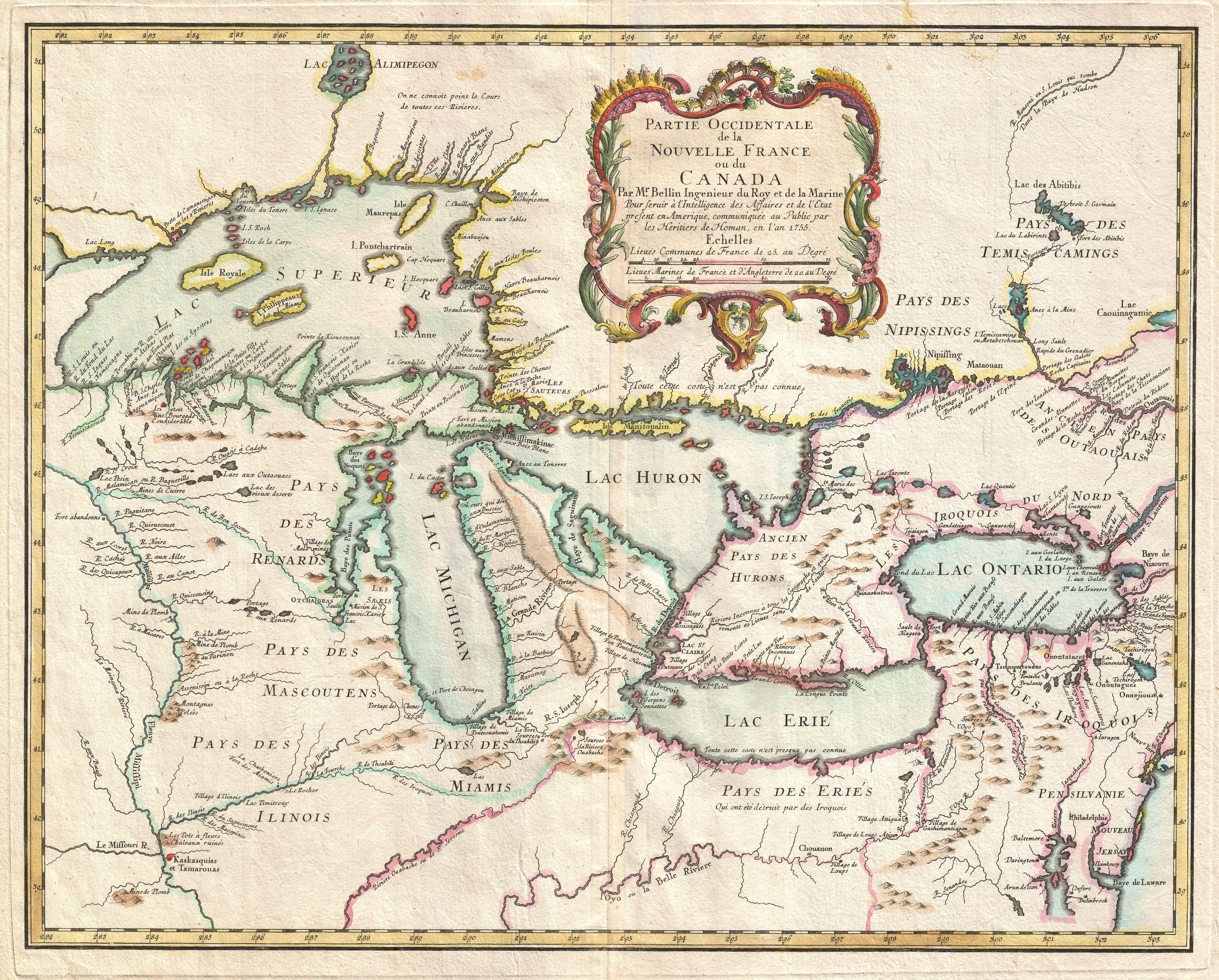
- Pays d'en Haut in New France on a map by Jacques Nicholas Bellin in 1755
- Capital: Quebec
- History
  - Established: 1610
  - Ceded to Britain: 10 February 1763
Preceded by	Succeeded by
Algonquians	Province of Quebec (1763–1791)

The Pays d'en Haut (French: [pɛ.i dɑ̃ o]; Highlands) was a territory of New France that included most of the Great Lakes region, expanding west and south over time into the North American continent as the French had explored. The Pays d'en Haut was established in 1610 and depended on the colony of Canada until 1763, when the Treaty of Paris ended New France, and both were ceded to the British as the Province of Quebec.

== History ==
The territory included several regions in North America, notably Huronia (Wendake), the constituent homelands of the Council of Three Fires like Anishinaabewaki, and the Neutral Confederacy, all located west of Montreal. Sainte-Marie among the Hurons was established in 1639 by the French, their first mission north of the Great Lakes, along the eastern shore of Lake Huron. Following the destruction of the Huronia in 1649 by the Iroquois, the French missionaries returned to Canada with the remaining Hurons (Wendats), who established themselves in Wendake.

By 1660, France started a policy of expansion into the interior of North America from Canada, with the objectives to locate a Northwest Passage to China, to exploit the territory's natural resources, such as fur and mineral ores, and to convert the native population to Catholicism. Fur traders began exploring the pays d'en haut, the "upper country" around the Great Lakes at the time. In 1659, Pierre-Esprit Radisson and Médard Chouart des Groseilliers reached the western end of Lake Superior, where priests founded missions, such as the Mission of Sault Sainte Marie in 1668. In 1671, Father Jacques Marquette established a French mission at Michilimackinac that would over the next half century become a waypoint for exploration, a place for diplomatic relations with natives, and a commercial centre for fur trade. On 17 May 1673, Louis Jolliet and Jacques Marquette began the exploration of the Mississippi River, which they called the Sioux Tongo (the large river) or Michissipi. They reached the mouth of the Arkansas River, and then returned upstream, having learned that the great river ran towards the Gulf of Mexico and not towards the Pacific Ocean as they had presumed.

=== Northern expansion ===
In what are today Ontario, Canada, part of Minnesota, United States of America, and the eastern Canadian Prairies, trading posts and forts were built, including Fort Frontenac (1673), Fort Kaministiquia (1679), Fort Saint Pierre (1731), Fort Saint Charles (1732), and Fort Rouillé (1750).

=== Southern expansion ===
In 1701, Antoine Laumet de La Mothe founded Fort Pontchartrain du Détroit, which became the centre of French military presence in the region. Other forts in the area strengthened the network; these included Fort Niagara (1678), Fort Crevecoeur (1680), Fort de Buade (1683), Fort Saint-Louis du Rocher (1683), Fort Saint Antoine (1686), Fort Saint-Joseph (1691), Fort Michilimackinac (1715), Fort Miami (1715), Fort La Baye (1717), Fort Ouiatenon (1717), Fort Chagouamigon (1718), and Fort Beauharnois (1727). These forts provided French sovereignty in the area and facilitated commerce with the natives. In 1717, southern areas nearer the Mississippi River known as the Illinois Country were transferred from Canada to Louisiana, a colony of France south at the mouth of the river.

=== Settlements ===
The French settlements of the Pays d'en Haut, if considered distinct from the French fortifications to which they were often attached, in the vicinity of the Great Lakes were Detroit, La Baye, Saint Ignace, Sault Sainte-Marie, and Vincennes. Vincennes was later attached to the Pays des Illinois, which was part of the French colony of Louisiana. The population of each of these settlements was not necessarily large, e. g., by 1773 after the political termination of the Pays d'en Haut, the population of Detroit was 1,400.

Protecting the Pays d'en Haut were four forts: Fort Presque Isle (1753), Fort Le Boeuf (1753), Fort Duquesne (1754), and Fort Machault (1754).

== Recent terminology ==
Today, the term Les Pays-d'en-Haut refers to a regional county municipality in the Laurentides region of Quebec, north of Montreal. It is the traditional name of a larger area in the hills northwest of Montréal, centred on upper portions of Rivière du Nord (Laurentides) river. Its settlements were founded well after the original meaning of the name had become obsolete. The series Les Belles Histoires des pays d'en haut takes place in that area.

== See also ==
- New France
- Military of New France
- Historic regions of the United States
- List of French forts in North America
- Upper Canada
