= Fort Trempealeau =

- Part of New France
- Trempealeau, Wisconsin, United States

Site information
- Type: Trading post / Fort
- Controlled by: France

Location
- Coordinates: 44.01473°N 91.47391°W

Site history
- Built: 1685
- Built by: Nicolas Perrot and Canadiens
- In use: 1685–1686, 1731 (re-established)

Fort Trempealeau was founded in 1685 by Nicholas Perrot and a groupe of Canadiens. In the fall of 1685, Perrot and his men arrived at Mont Trempealeau by canoe. The Winnebagos called this mountain, Hay-nee-ah-cheh, or the mountain in the water. That is why Perrot called it in French, la montagne qui trempe à l'eau, or Trempealeau mountain. There, Perrot and his men built a protective shelter in preparation for winter. Several weeks earlier they had left La Baye Green Bay and crossed Wisconsin via the Fox and Wisconsin Rivers to reach the Mississippi Valley. The purpose of this expedition was to establish alliances with the Ioway and Dakota Indians in order to expand French interests in the fur trade market. Although Perrot's venture was not the first French excursion into the upper Mississippi Valley, his was the first attempt to establish a foothold in this region. In the spring of 1686 the Trempealeau site was abandoned for a more advantageous location along Lake Pepin where Perrot built Fort Saint Antoine. Over the next thirty-five years French economic fortunes in the upper Mississippi Valley waxed and waned. It was not until 1731, and the end of the Fox Indian wars, that the French under the command of René Godefroy, sieur de Linctot returned to Trempealeau and established another trading post.

== See also ==
- Fort Beauharnois
- Fort Saint Antoine
