= Fort La Baye =

Coordinates: 44°18′18″N 88°00′21″W

- Green Bay, Wisconsin

Site information
- Type: Fort
- Controlled by: Canada (New France)

Site history
- Built: 1717
- In use: 1717-1760
- Battles/wars: Sauk and Fox War, 1733

Garrison information
- Past commanders: Pierre-Paul Marin, Joseph Marin
- Garrison: Compagnies Franches de la Marine

Fort La Baye was a French military post at La Baye (today Green Bay, Wisconsin), originally built in 1684, remodeled in 1717, and occupied until 1760.

One Commandant of the Fort was the famous Chevalier Jacques Testard de Montigny, Knight of the Order of St. Louis. By 1718, there were a number of French Canadian families living in the area near the fort. Other families settled across the river from the fort in an area which was called Munnomonee, because of the Menominee native people that lived there. Most of the families had come to La Baye from the Mackinac area.

In 1733 the Sauks, allied to the Meskwaki (Fox), attacked the French at Fort La Baye. When a French force went out after them, the sons of De Villiers and Repentigny were killed. In 1737 Claude-Antoine de Bermen de La Martinière was appointed commander of the fort. Pierre-Paul Marin became the leader of a French force against the Meskwaki and Sauks. He prevailed and in 1739 the Marquis de Beauharnois, Governor of Canada, wrote "Sieur Marin has re-established peace and quietness".

== See also ==
- Fort Beauharnois
- Fort Saint Antoine
- Fort Trempealeau
