= List of the United States cities with large French American populations =

The cities with the largest French American populations are in Maine. However, in northern Maine, they are of Acadian ancestry, and in southern Maine and northern New Hampshire, of Canadian ancestry.

The cities are as follows:

Name	Percent French
Madawaska, Maine	75%
Frenchville, Maine	70%
Van Buren, Maine	65%
Fort Kent, Maine	63%
Berlin, New Hampshire	53.4%
Lewiston, Maine	50%
Auburn, Maine	46.2%
Biddeford, Maine	46%
Greene, Maine	43.1%

== See also ==
- History of the French in Baltimore
- History of the French in Louisville
- French in Syracuse, New York
