= René Godefroy, sieur de Linctot =

René Godefroy, Sieur de Linctot de Tonnancour (May 17, 1675 – March 27, 1748) was an early settler in New France. He was from an early, prominent, French Canadian family.

The son of Michel Godefroy de Linctot, who was said to be the first European born at Trois-Rivières, Quebec, and Perinne Picoté (or Picotte), he was born in Trois-Rivières. In 1706, he was named an ensign in the French Troupes de marine. Four years later, he was given command of the fort at Ile aux Tourtes.

In 1718, a post was founded at Chequamegon by Paul le Gardeur, sieur de St. Pierre, with Godefroy de Linctot second in command. A settlement of Canadien traders was this year reported as existing at La Baye, in Wisconsin. Godefroy succeeded Le Gardeur as fort commander in 1720, remaining there until 1726. In 1731, at the end of the Fox Indian Wars, the Canadiens, under the command of Godefroy, returned to Trempealeau and established another trading post. In 1732, the post of La Baye was rebuilt under command of Nicolas Antoine Coulon de Villiers. Godefroy, with a company of fur traders, rebuilt the Lake Pepin post.

In 1709, he married Marie-Madeleine LeMoyne with whom he had five children; she died in 1727. He married Marie-Catherine d' Ailleboust in 1728; they had one son.

Linctot died at Montreal at the age of 72.

His grandson Daniel-Maurice Godefroy de Linctot later served as an American Indian agent in the Illinois Country.

== See also ==
- Military of New France
