= History of Peoria, Illinois =

The history of Peoria, Illinois began when French explorers constructed Fort Crevecoeur in 1680. The County of Peoria was organized in 1825, the town in 1835, and Peoria was incorporated as a city in 1845. During the Industrial Revolution, coal mining, steamboat, and railroad businesses flourished in Peoria. Until Prohibition took effect in 1920, Peoria was known as the “Whiskey Capital of the World” and produced more rye whiskey than anywhere else in the world at the time. The "whiskey barons" contributed to the infrastructure of Peoria, building mansions, parks, churches, schools, and other historic buildings. Manufacturing has been a key industry in Peoria for over 150 years, including bicycles, automobiles, Caterpillar machines, washing machines, and barbed wire. During World War II, Peoria's USDA lab made strides in the commercial production of penicillin. Today Peoria is a mid-sized city supported by industries such manufacturing and healthcare, as well as small businesses and a growing arts and culture scene.

== Early history ==
What has become Peoria and environs bears many remnants of Native Americans. Artifacts and Native American burial mounds show that people lived in the area as far back as 10,000 BC. Burial mounds have been found along the Illinois River near Peoria from Mossville to Kingston Mines. Artifacts show evidence of Woodland period, Hopewellian, and Mississippian cultures.

Several important Native American settlements were located close to Peoria Lake, like the main villages of the Kickapoo and Potawatomi tribes. Other tribes may have used it as a game preserve during the winter while living in the Kaskaskia village, as the area was known for its "fat beasts". The Peoria tribe remained near the lake after the Kaskaskia departed before 1700.

== 17th century ==
The French were the first Europeans to explore the area that would become Peoria in 1673. Father Jacques Marquette and Louis Joliet explored the region, finding the Illini Indians who were part of the Algonquian people. Those tribes that were part of the Illinois Confederacy at that time were the Peoria, Kaskaskia, Michigamea, Cahokia, and Tamaroa.

In 1680, two French explorers, René-Robert Cavelier, Sieur de La Salle and Henri de Tonti, constructed the first fort on the east bank of the Illinois River, and named it Fort Crèvecœur. Eleven years later, in 1691, another fort was built by de Tonti and his cousin, François Daupin de la Forêt. It is believed the fort was near present-day Mary and Adams Streets. Called Fort St. Louis du Pimiteoui, it is also known as Fort Pimiteoui. The fort, and the town established around it, was the first European settlement in Illinois.

== 18th century ==
The settlement became legally British in 1763 after the French & Indian War, but remained French in practice. By 1778 the village had become part of the territory of the new United States, and George Rogers Clark appointed Maillet as military commander. Maillet established a new village, 1.5 miles (2.4 km) south of the old one. It later became known as "La Ville de Maillet" and was on the present-day site of downtown Peoria. The new village was considered to be better situated, and by 1796 or 1797, all the inhabitants of the old village had moved to the new.

According to at least one document, the first black resident of Peoria was a man named Jean Baptiste Point du Sable. A document shows that he purchased a house and land on March 13, 1773 and remained there until at least 1783, where he was still on record as the head of a house.

== 19th century ==
American settlement began in April 1819, when settlers arrived at the old Fort Clark.

The County of Peoria was organized on January 13, 1825. The county seat was erected near the old Fort Clark. Peoria was incorporated as a town in 1835, having then a population of about 1,600. In 1845, it was incorporated as a city.

The County Courthouse was a log cabin, rented for $1 a day. By 1835, a new two-story building was constructed (near the present-day Bob Michel bridge). The first hospital was also part of this new building, until it moved in 1876 as part of OSF Saint Francis Medical Center. In 1873, a limestone building inspired by the Philadelphia’s Independence Hall was constructed.

The Grand Opera House was constructed in the 1880s.

During the later half of the 19th century vaudeville became widely popular. Peoria was a main stop on the circuits and the phrase "Will it play in Peoria?" became popular from the early 1880s through the early 1930s.

In 1889, Peter Sommer obtained a patent for a machine that wove wire into fence. Keystone Woven Wire Fence Company (late Keystone Steel & Wire Company in 1907) produced the first woven wire fence. The company was started on a farm in neighboring Tazewell County across the river, but moved to Peoria on Adams Street and later to Bartonville.

In 1892, Charles Duryea built the first gasoline-powered automobile in Peoria.

Bradley Polytechnic Institute (later Bradley University) was founded by philanthropist Lydia Moss Bradley in 1897.

The Peoria City Hall was built in 1897 and dedicated in January 1899.

== 20th century ==
=== 1900s ===
In the spring of 1905, the Al Fresco Amusement Park opened in Peoria Heights, featuring a Ferris wheel, carousel, roller coaster, and other attractions.

=== 1960s ===
The new L-shaped County Courthouse was constructed for $4 million and was dedicated by Lady Bird Johnson on September 22, 1965.

=== 1970s ===
On May 1, 1973, three gunmen held a classroom of fifth-grade students hostage at St. Cecilia Catholic grade school. One hostage was John Ardis, younger brother of Mayor Jim Ardis. The stand-off lasted 90 minutes with only one casualty: one of the gunmen.

=== 1980s ===
The County Courthouse was expanded in a $11.5 million project to improve security and expand courtroom space.

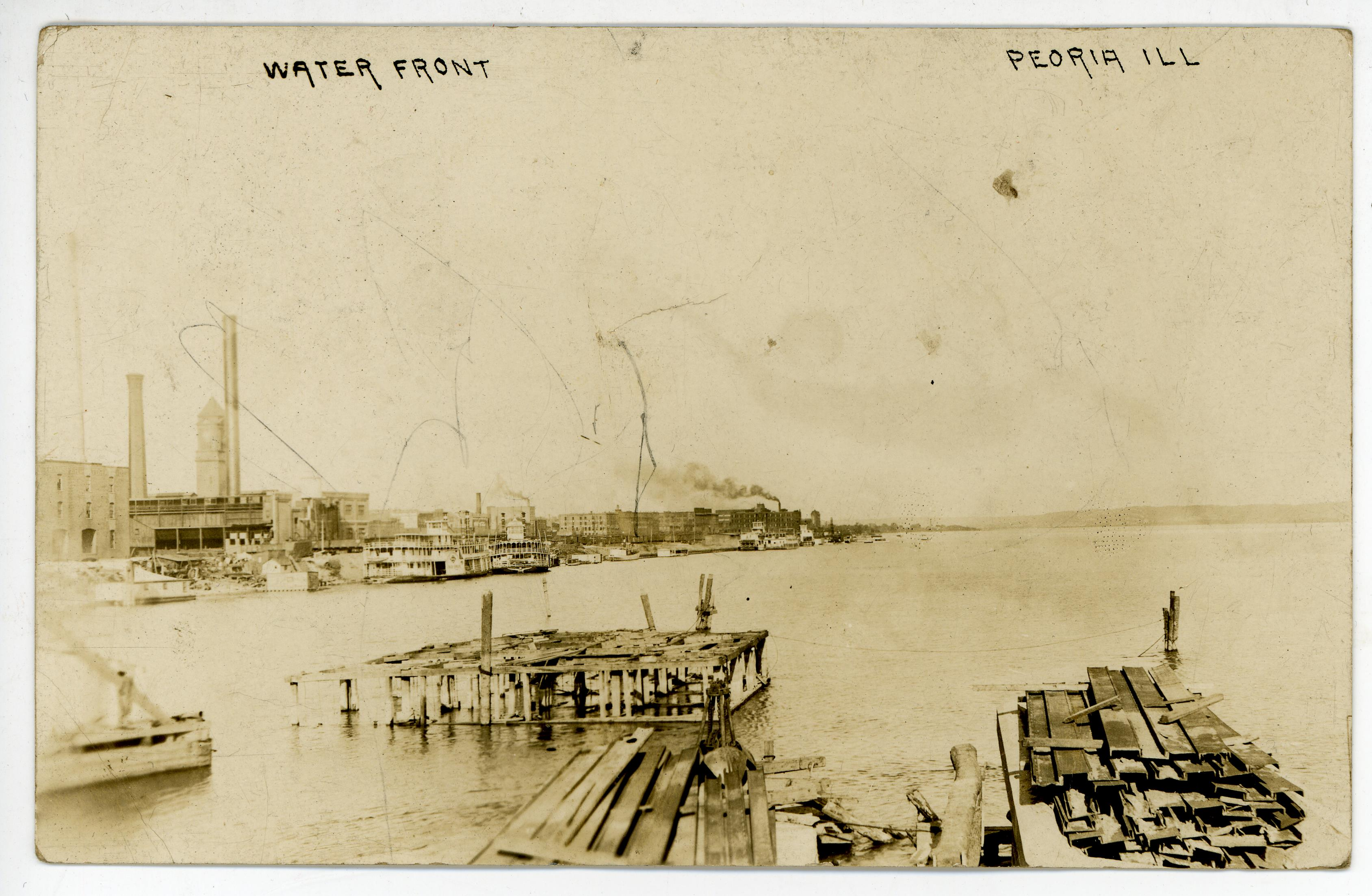
Waterfront in Peoria, Illinois, c.1909

== 21st century ==
=== 2000s ===
The revision of Interstates 74 and 474, and work on the McClugage Bridge, were completed. Peoria's Catholic bishop, John J. Myers, hosted a visit by Blessed Mother Teresa of Calcutta and was named Archbishop of Newark in 2001, shortly after September 11. The University Street and Pekin campuses of Illinois Central College were completed. OSF Saint Francis Medical Center started Peoria's largest-ever private building expansion to build a new emergency room and a new Children's Hospital of Illinois; and Methodist Medical Center of Illinois and Pekin Hospital also expanded. U.S. Representative Ray LaHood became U.S. Secretary of Transportation under President Barack Obama; he was succeeded by Aaron Schock. The Peoria Zoo made a major expansion in 2009. The Peoria airport was renamed after Peoria native Wayne Downing, a retired general.

=== 2010s ===
Peoria District 150, suffering from high levels of student poverty and red ink, closed Woodruff High School and debated whether to construct a new Glen Oak School and a charter school. Peoria Notre Dame High School explored construction of a new high school. The Jump Trading Simulation Center is opened and the expansion is completed at OSF Saint Francis Medical Center. Illinois Central College in East Peoria significantly expanded its North Campus in Peoria and opens and then expands a new Pekin campus. UnityPoint Health-Peoria bought Methodist Medical Center and Proctor Hospital in Peoria, and later, Pekin Hospital in nearby Pekin. The University of Illinois at Chicago Medical School Peoria Campus expanded and became a four-year medical school. Peoria (Central) High School won its first ever men's basketball state championship. [2004 marked the school's 4th State Boys' Basketball Championship, with the other years being 1908, 1977, and 2003.]

In 2015, Caterpillar announced plans to expand its world headquarters in Peoria. However, in 2017, Caterpillar moved its world headquarters and about 300 employees to Deerfield, though 12,000 employees (the largest global concentration) remained in Peoria.

=== 2020s ===
On March 16, 2020, Peoria County confirmed its first case of COVID-19 during the pandemic. April 14, 2020 was the date of the first COVID-related death in Peoria County. In April 2021, the Peoria metro area had the 9th highest daily average for new COVID cases in the nation. In December 2021, Peoria area hospitals were at or near capacity with a surge of the Delta variant.

In April 2023, Urbana-based Carle Health bought Methodist Hospital, Proctor Hospital, Pekin Hospital, Methodist College, and their associated clinics for $75 million.

On June 11, 2026, The City Would have a tornado hurdling to the town

== See also ==
- List of City of Peoria Historic Landmarks and Districts
- National Register of Historic Places listings in Peoria County, Illinois
