= Daniel-Maurice Godefroy de Linctot =

Daniel-Maurice Godefroy de Linctot (baptized May 5, 1739 – died between January 18 and April 30, 1783) was a colonial army officer and merchant in Quebec and an Indian agent in the United States.

The son of Louis-René Godefroy de Linctot and Catherine-Apolline Blondeau, Linctot joined the army of New France as a cadet, becoming an ensign in 1759. After the French defeat, Linctot and his family went to France, arriving in January 1762. He returned to North America and became a trader in the Illinois Country. Although he originally was considered a British supporter, Linctot joined the American militia in July 1778. He led a unit of horse soldiers in attacks against Peouarea, Vincennes and Ouiatanon. In 1779, he was named Indian agent by George Rogers Clark; the commission was confirmed by Virginia governor Thomas Jefferson the following year. Linctot helped recruit members of the Shawnees, Delawares and other tribes in the Ohio Valley to the American cause.

In 1782, Virginia governor Benjamin Harrison wrote to the Virginia delegates in Congress regarding unpaid salary and expenses for Linctot.

He died in the Illinois Country sometime during the following year.
