= Fort Crevecoeur =

- Fort Crèvecœur (French)
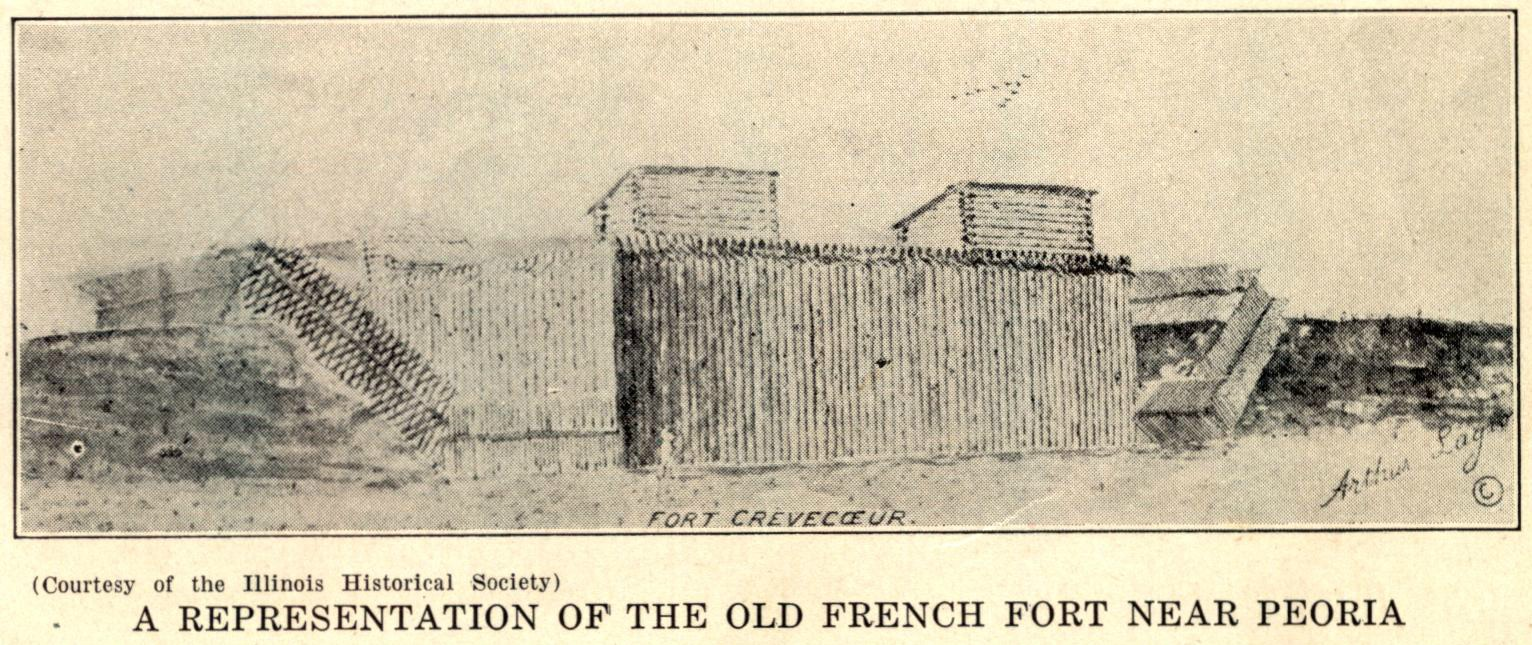
- Interactive map of Fort Crevecoeur
- Location: present-day Creve Coeur, Illinois

History
- Built: 1680
- Rebuilt: Destroyed in 1680 and replaced by Fort Pimiteoui in 1691

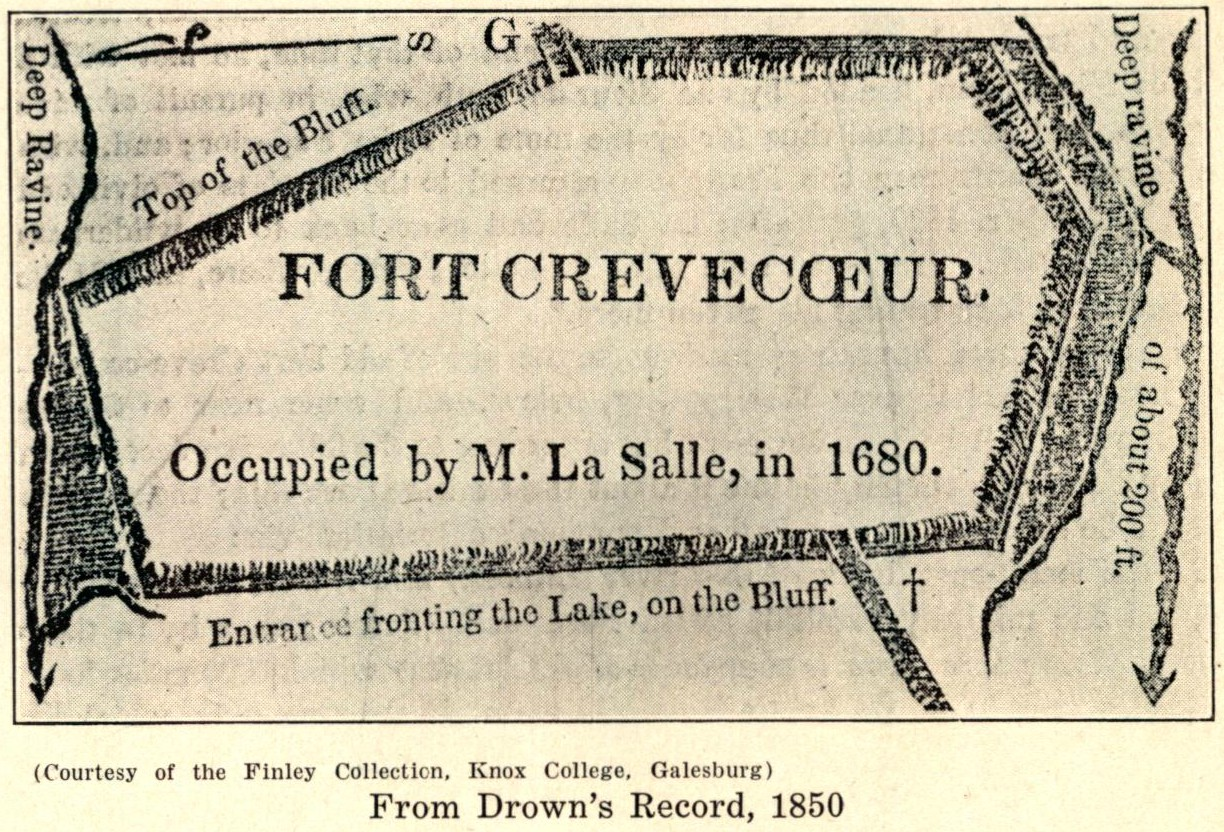
Map of Fort Crevecoeur in 1680

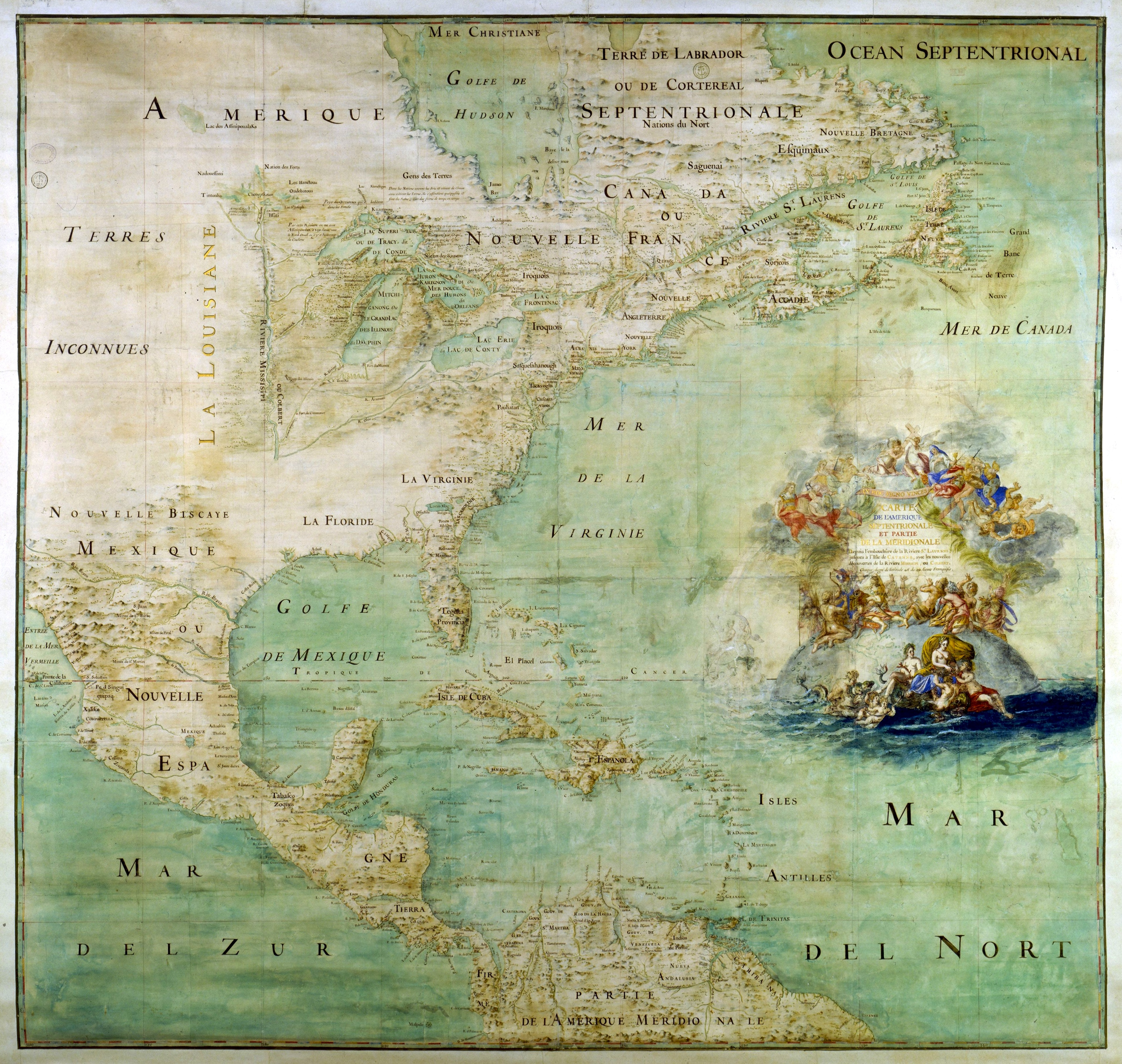
Map by Abbott Claude Bernou in 1681, showing Fort Crèvecoeur on the East bank of the Illinois River.

Fort Crevecoeur (French: Fort Crèvecœur) was the first public building erected by Europeans within the boundaries of the modern state of Illinois and the first fort built in the West by the French. It was founded on the east bank of the Illinois River, in the Illinois Country near the present site of Creve Coeur, a suburb of Peoria, Illinois, in January 1680. It was destroyed on April 16, 1680 by members of La Salle's expedition, who mutinied and abandoned it, fearful of being attacked by the Haudenosaunee as the Beaver Wars extended into the area.

Reestablishing a more lasting presence, the French founded Fort St Louis du Pimiteoui nearby in 1691, at the former Kaskaskia village destroyed by the Haudenosaunee (Pimiteoui being the French name for what is now called Peoria Lake, a noted widening in the Illinois River). It became a center of trade and was partially settled during the colonial period. Henri de Tonti was a primary founder of both the Crevecouer and Pimiteoui posts.

== Founding ==
On January 15, 1680, French explorers René-Robert Cavelier, Sieur de La Salle, and Henri de Tonti began construction of a stockade they would call Fort Crèvecoeur (Broken Heart). It was intended to help the local Peoria tribe defend themselves against the powerful Haudenosaunee League, who had entered this region to secure hunting grounds for the beaver fur trade. On that day in January, Mass was celebrated and the Gospel preached by the Récollets, Gabriel Ribourde, Zenobius Membre, and Louis Hennepin. They finished the fort in early March, naming it "Fort Broken Heart" because of the difficulties, including desertions of troops, that they suffered during its construction.

Dr. Daniel Coxe wrote in 1719:

Monsieur LaSalle erected a fort in the year 1680, which he named Crève-coeur, from the Grief which seiz'd him on the Loss of one of his chief trading Barks richly laden, and the Mutiny and villianous [sic] Intrigues of some of his Company, who first attempted to poyson and afterwards desert him.

La Salle also started building a 40-ton barque to replace Le Griffon, which had disappeared several months before. On March 1, 1680, La Salle set off on foot for Fort Frontenac for supplies (including rigging for the ship), leaving Henri de Tonti to hold Fort Crèvecoeur in Illinois.

== Destruction ==
While on his return trip up the Illinois River, La Salle concluded that Starved Rock might provide an ideal location for another fortification and sent word downriver to Tonti regarding this idea. Following La Salle’s instructions, Henri de Tonti had left Fort Crèvecoeur on April 15, 1680 with Father Ribourde and two other men, to begin fortifying the settlement and Fort St. Louis at Starved Rock.

The next day, the remaining seven men, led by Martin Chartier, pillaged Fort Crèvecoeur of all provisions and ammunition, destroyed the fort, and headed back to Canada. On visiting the ruins of the fort a few days later, La Salle observed that someone had written on the side of the unfinished barque, "Nous sommes tous sauvages," ["We are all savages"].

The mutiny was probably caused by the men's fear of being killed by Haudenosaunee raiding parties. They had invaded the region from their stronghold south of the Great Lakes, and were disrupting and attacking the local Illinois communities at the height of the Beaver Wars. The men had demanded that La Salle return with them to Canada, which he was unwilling to do.

In addition, one of the mutineers, shipbuilder Moyse Hillaret who was later captured, testified that "some [of the men] had had no pay for three years," and alleged that La Salle had mistreated them. In a deposition made before the Sieur du Chesneau, Intendant of New France, dated 17 August 1680, Hillaret stated the mutineers were dissatisfied "because the said Sieur de La Salle wanted them to build sleighs to draw his goods and personal effects as far as the village of the Illinois [the site of the proposed Fort St. Louis (Starved Rock)]."

Joining Tonti at Starved Rock, two men who had been at Fort Crèvecoeur told him of its destruction. Tonti sent messengers to La Salle in Canada to report the events. Tonti returned to Fort Crèvecoeur to collect any tools not destroyed and moved them to the Kaskaskia Village of the Illinois near Starved Rock. The mutineers, assisted by some other men they recruited along the way, looted some of La Salle's possessions at Michilimackinac and at Fort Niagara. They split into two groups, one of which went to Albany and the second to Fort Frontenac, reportedly with the intention of finding and killing La Salle. In August, La Salle recaptured some of the mutineers, however Chartier took refuge with a band of Shawnee Indians and went with them to Pennsylvania.

On September 10, 1680, nearly six hundred Haudenosaunee warriors, armed with guns, approached the Kaskaskia village. At a meeting with de Tonti in advance, representatives of both the Haudenosaunee League and the Illinois Confederation accused him of treachery. Tonti tried to mediate their disagreements in order to delay the Haudenosaunee attack until the women, children and old people could escape from the village, until he was wounded by an Haudenosaunee warrior, who stabbed him with a knife. The Haudenosaunee burned Kaskaskia village and built a fort on that site near Starved Rock. Tonti with his allies fled the area, heading for La Baye.

== Fort St. Louis du Pimiteoui ==
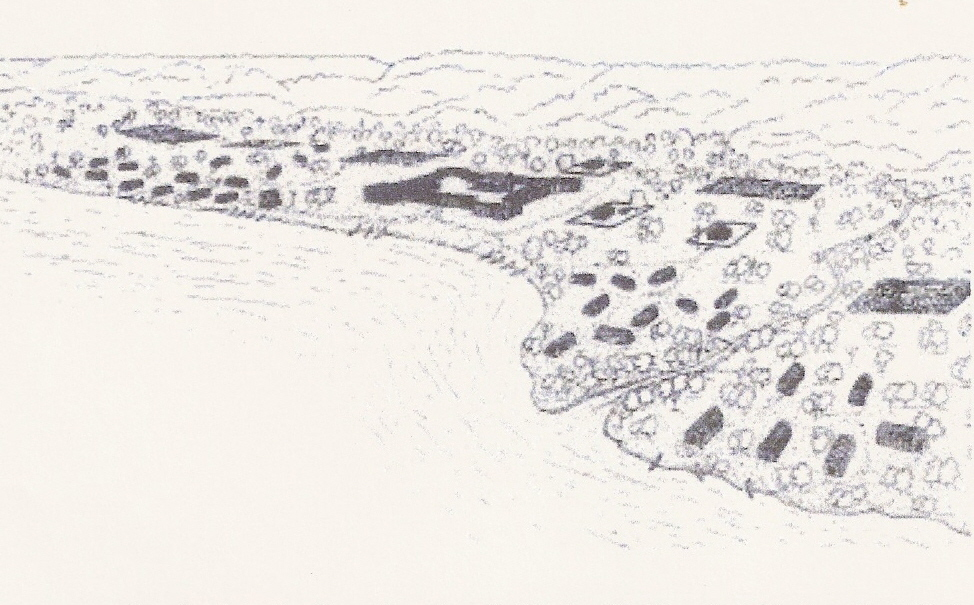
Fort St. Louis du Pimiteoui, circa 1702.

In 1691, Tonti returned to the area and founded another fort. This fort is known variously as Fort St. Louis du Pimiteoui, Fort Pimiteoui, and Old Fort Peoria (Pimiteoui – English: Fat Lake – was the name of what is now called, Peoria Lake, a stretch where the Illinois River significantly widens). It was intermittently a center of trade, particularly fur trade, and sometimes settlement throughout the colonial period, when control of it shifted from the French to the British in 1763 after the French and Indian War.

== Disputed location ==
Before 1922, the county Superintendent of Woodford, Peoria, and Tazewell counties appointed a committee of nine people to make a study of the fort's location and present a public report. The committee excavated in several places, but were unable to agree on a report. The Tazewell County Historical Society reviewed evidence presented for the various sites, and voted to select the Lagron site near the river above the present depot in Wesley City. The State Historical Society had a committee to review evidence, but due to deaths of some members of the Committee, the composition of the committee changed before work could be completed.

In 2022, articles disputed the location of Fort Crevecoeur, placing it south of Beardstown. These build on work cited in 2006.

== Present-day park ==
Fort Creve Coeur State Park
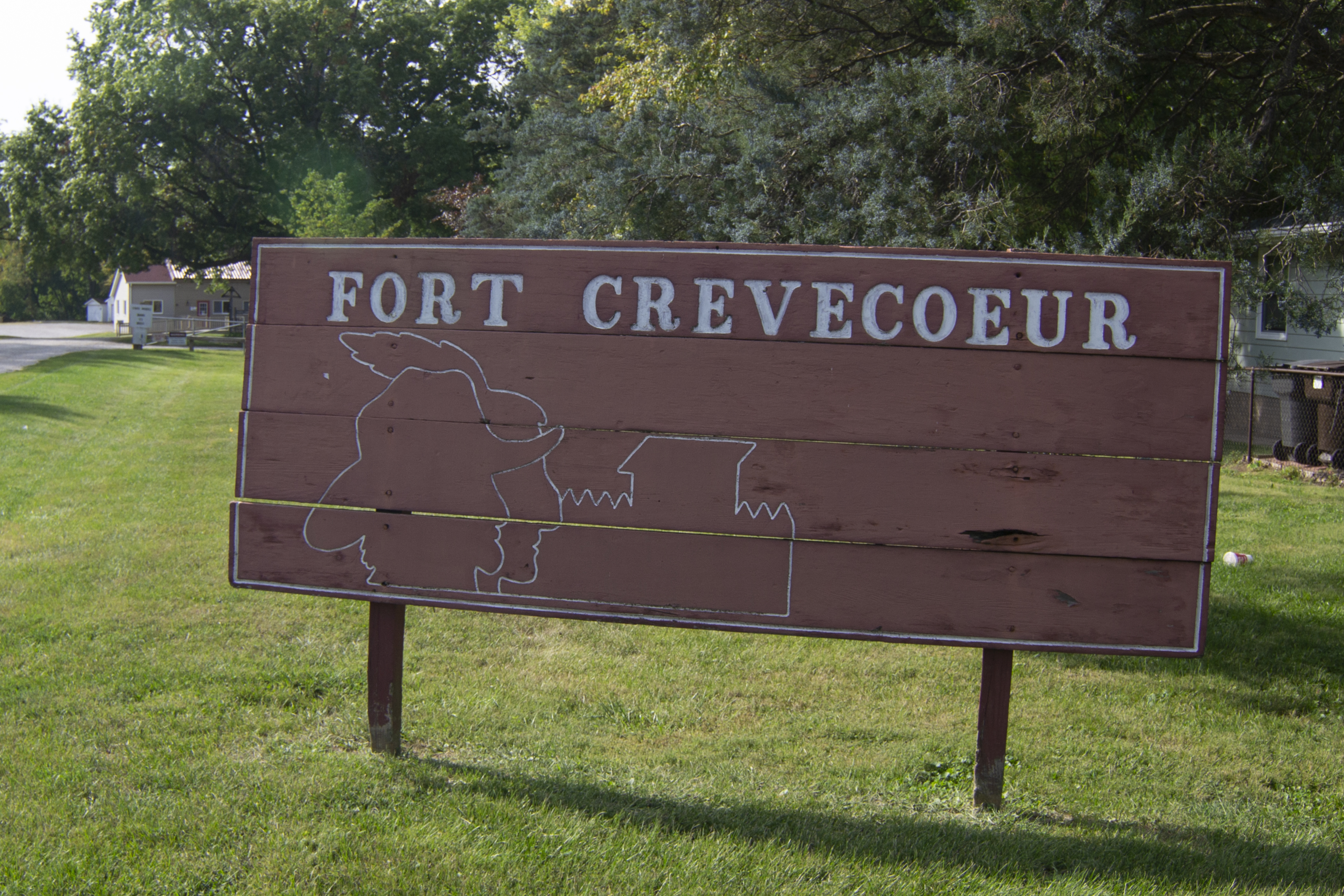
- Interactive map of Fort Creve Coeur State Park
- Location: 301 Lawnridge Dr, Creve Coeur, IL 61610
- Nearest city: Creve Coeur, Illinois
- Coordinates: 40°38′47.45″N 89°36′23.92″W
- Area: 86.6 acres (35.0 ha)
- Website: https://www.stateparks.com/fort_creve_coeur_state_park_in_illinois.html

The present-day village of Creve Coeur has a recreation of the fort located in a park in the Creve Coeur Nature Preserve.

The 86.6-acre park was deeded to the village of Creve Coeur in 1976 and leased to the non-profit organization, Fort Crevecoeur, Inc. The non-profit recreated the fort based on original design and dimensions of the 1680 winter quarters.

A marker was erected by the state historical society. C.H. Wagner donated 15 acres (6.1 ha) to start the park. The Daughters of the American Revolution selected the location for the marker.

=== Flora ===
A small glacial drift hill prairie on the northwestern ridge contains over 50 prairie plant species including little bluestem, Indian grass, pale coneflower, and Canada milk vetch.

=== Recreation ===
The park has a museum, gift shop, pavilions, RV park and campground, playground, and hiking and biking trails. Five miles of biking trails were cleared by the Peoria Area Mountain Biking Association in 2021. The trail offers views of bluff hardwood woodlands, the Illinois River, and the Peoria skyline.

The Fling at the Fort disc golf tournament is played in late Summer on temporary baskets. The tournament includes a hole that finishes in the middle of Fort Crevecoeur near the pillory. This is the only disc golf tournament in the Midwest that includes a hole that finishes in a fort.

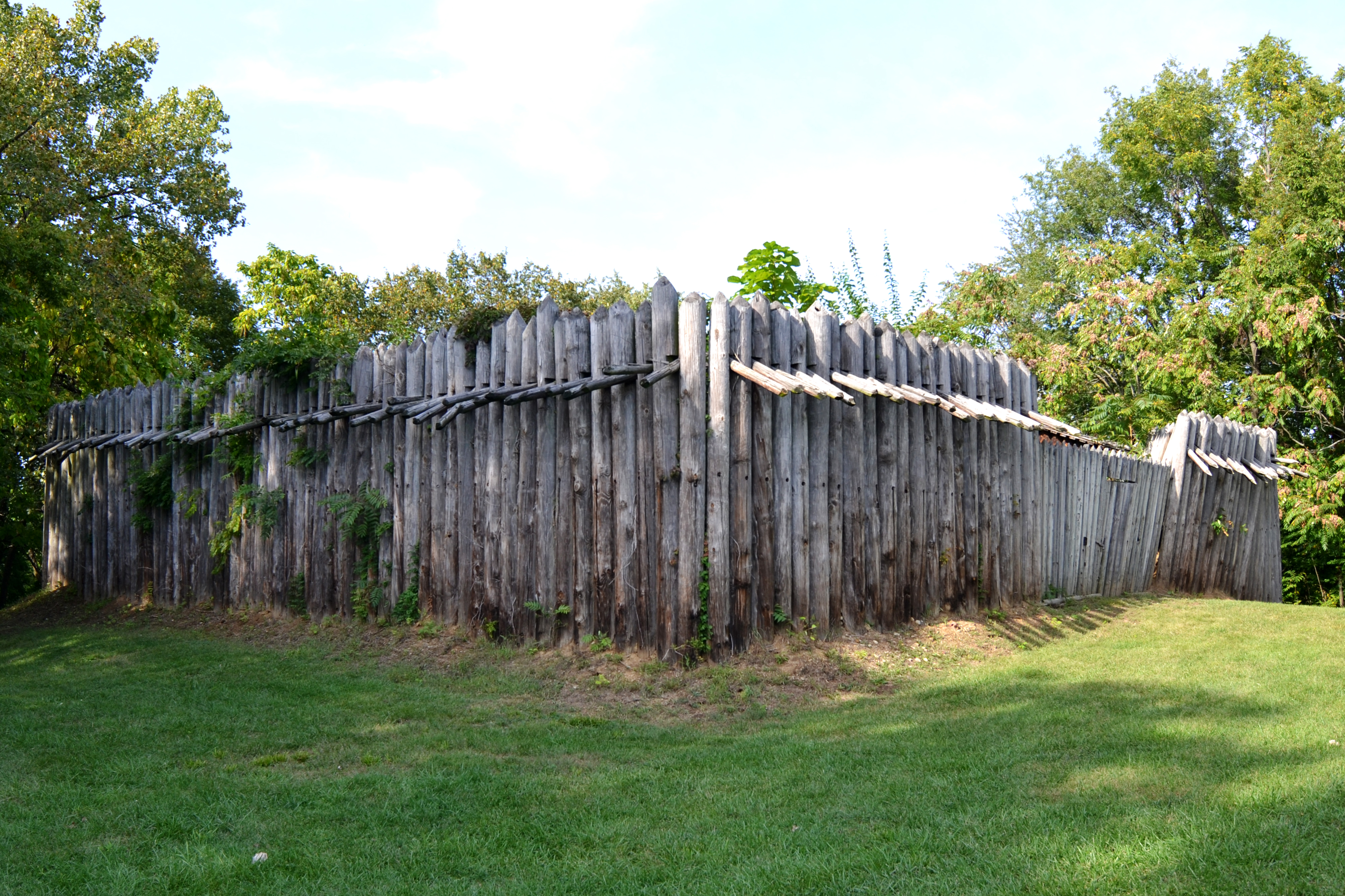
Fort Crevecoeur corner

== See also ==
- History of Peoria, Illinois
- List of French forts in North America
