= Fort Saint Antoine =

French fort on Lake Pepin, Wisconsin, US

Coordinates: 44.46535°N 92.22458°W

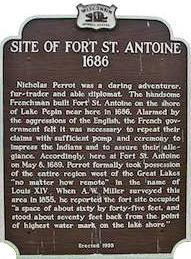

Fort Saint Antoine was a French fort on Lake Pepin in present-day Wisconsin founded in 1686 by explorer and fur trader Nicholas Perrot and his expedition of Canadiens. They had come to the region to begin trading with Native American tribes of the area.

== Perrot's expedition ==
In the fall of 1685, Perrot and his men arrived at Trempealeau Mountain by canoe down the Trempealeau River, reaching its mouth at its confluence with the Mississippi River. They built a protective shelter there in preparation for winter. Several weeks earlier they had left La Baye and crossed Wisconsin via the Fox and Wisconsin rivers to reach the upper Mississippi Valley.

Their purpose was to establish alliances with the Ioway and Dakota Indians in order to expand French interests in the fur trade market. Although Perrot's venture was not the first French excursion into the upper Mississippi Valley, his was the first attempt to establish a trading foothold among the Native American tribes in this region.

== Founding of Fort Saint Antoine ==
In the spring of 1686 the expedition abandoned the Trempealeau site for a more advantageous location along Lake Pepin, where Perrot built Fort Saint Antoine. Over the next thirty-five years French economic fortunes in the upper Mississippi Valley waxed and waned. It was not until 1731, and the end of the Fox Indian Wars, that the French under the command of René Godefroy, sieur de Linctot returned to Trempealeau and established another trading post on the upper Mississippi. After the French lost the Seven Years' War to the British in 1763, they ceded all land in North America east of the Mississippi to Britain. They ceded their territory to the west to Spanish rule.

== See also ==
- Fort Beauharnois
- Fort Trempealeau
