= Domaine du roy =

Region of New France

- of New France
- 1652–1763
- Flag

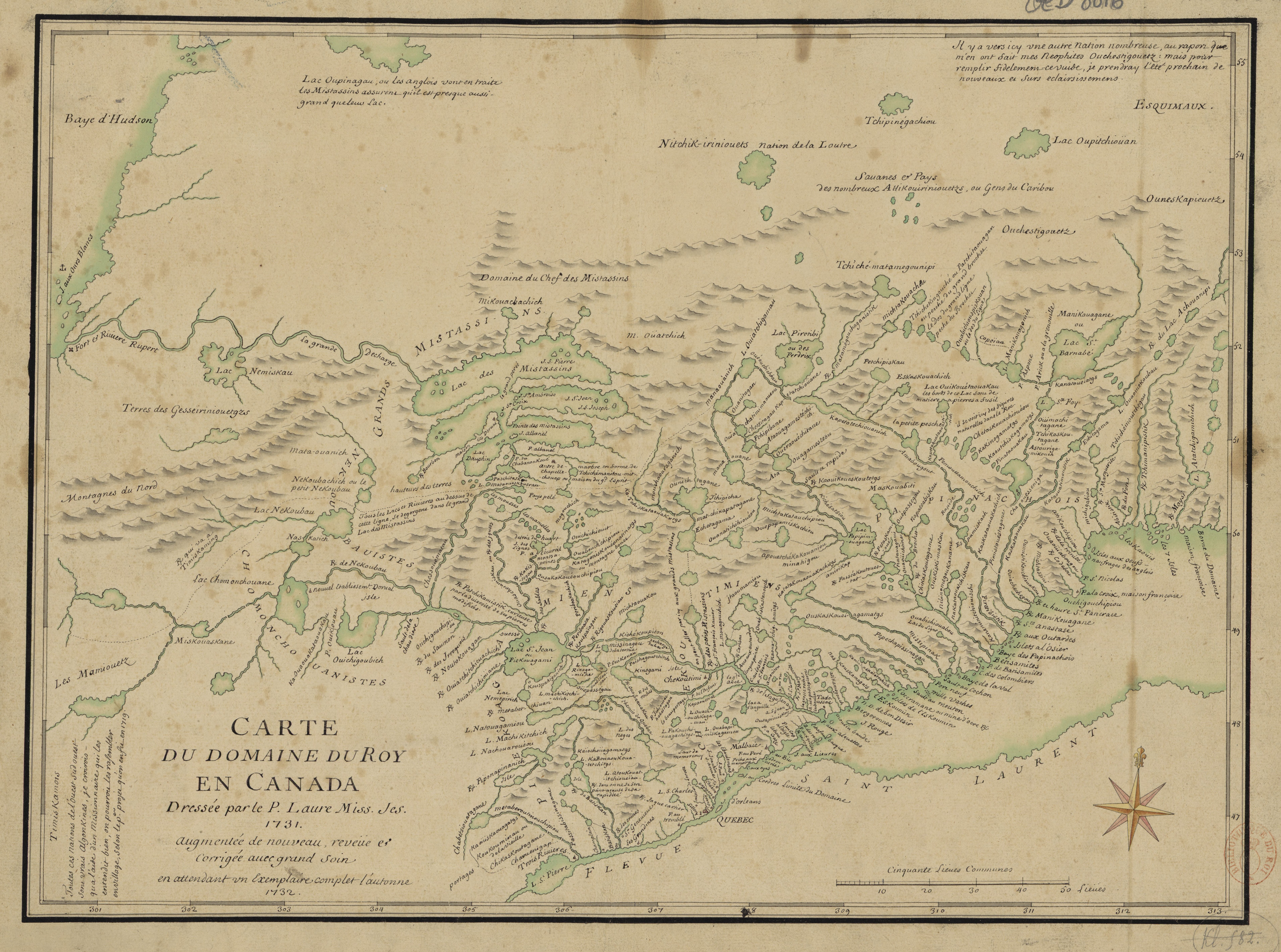
- Domaine du Roy, 1731
- Capital: Quebec
- History
  - Established: 1652
  - Ceded to Britain: 10 February 1763

The Domaine du roy ("King's Domain") was a vast region of New France extending north from the shore of the Saint Lawrence River between the seigneurie of Les Éboulements (near the City of Quebec) and Cape Cormorant (near the present-day town Lourdes) towards the Hudson Bay watershed, an area claimed by Great Britain as Rupert's Land, the territory covered an area of 460,000 km^{2}.

Established in 1652, the Domaine du roy was renamed "King's Domain" after the French and Indian War. A present-day regional county municipality in the Saguenay–Lac-Saint-Jean region of Quebec also inherited the name Le Domaine-du-Roy.

== See also ==
- New France
- Military of New France
- Rupert's Land
