= Nicolas Perrot =

French explorer, fur trader, and diplomat

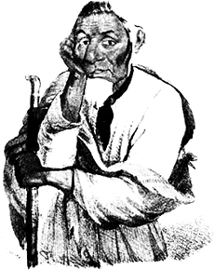
- Born: c. 1644; France
- Died: August 13, 1717; Bécancour, Quebec, New France
- Occupations: Explorer, fur trader, diplomat, interpreter
- Spouse: Madeleine Raclot
- Children: 11

Nicolas Perrot (English: /pɛˈroʊ/ peh-ROH, French: [nikɔla pɛʁo]; c. 1644–1717), a French explorer, fur trader, and diplomat, was one of the first European men to travel in the Upper Mississippi Valley, in what is now Wisconsin and Minnesota.

== Biography ==
Nicolas Perrot was born in France between 1641 and 1644, perhaps at Darcey in Burgundy, where his father was lieutenant of justice.

Perrot traveled to New France around 1660 with the Jesuit missionaries. He journeyed with several to the Western Great Lakes, where they intended to preach to the Native Americans, reaching present-day Wisconsin in 1665. He earned the friendship of the natives by swapping furs for guns, allowing the group to defend themselves on an equal footing against their enemies. He was nicknamed the "trafficker of iron", or "iron legs".

In 1667 he formed a fur trading company with three settlers in Montreal. On August 12, 1667, he returned to the Green Bay region. In 1670, he was enlisted as a translator for Simon-François Daumont de Saint-Lusson, a military officer and deputy of Jean Talon, who had been sent "to lay claim to the land of the Ottawa, Amikwa, Illinois, and of other nations discovered or to be discovered in North America contiguous and adjacent to Lake Superior (French: Lac Supérieur), the great inland sea, including all its length and breadth, and including the resources therein, for Louis XIV" at what was called "The Pageant of the Sault".

Afterward, he married Madeleine Raclot. Madeline, at the age of seventeen, had arrived in New France as a participant in the French Files de Roy movement to bring more women to New France to increase the colonies' population. He was given a land grant on the river Saint-Michel in present-day Quebec. By the 1681 census, he and Madeleine had six children. They had a total of eleven altogether. More can be read about the couple on the French-Canadian Genealogist website . Nicholas was an avid writer, even publishing his own memoir of his expeditions and of the many Indigenous cultures he both encountered and worked with, only ceasing his writing because he had run out of paper.

Perrot's relationship with and influence over the tribes of the West was drawn on again during the 1680s. In 1684, he participated in the peacekeeping mission of the Governor Antoine Lefebvre de La Barre and succeeded in bringing the warriors of several nations together to sign a peace treaty. In the spring of 1685, he was appointed Commandant-in-Chief of Bais Des Puants (present-day Green Bay, Wisconsin) and the neighboring regions when war broke out between the Meskwaki and the Sioux and Chippewa tribes. He worked hard to bring about peace, and was successful, at least for a time. After this, Perrot traveled to the northern waters of the Mississippi River, in the territory of the Sioux, where he built Fort Saint Antoine, now in Minnesota.

In the spring of 1687 he was in the region of Detroit taking part in an expedition. A fire broke out at the Jesuit mission at Bais Des Puants, and 40,000 livres worth of his furs were destroyed. Perrot was financially ruined. He returned to Montreal, where in the spring of 1688 he served as an interpreter for the treaty between Governor and Onondaga chief Otreouti, who promised the neutrality of the Onondaga, Cayuga, and Oneida of the Five Nations of the Haudenosaunee or Iroquois League in confrontations with the French. In 1689 he built Fort Saint-Pierre at the mouth of the Wisconsin River, and established peace among area tribes.

In 1690, he and Louis de la Porte de Louvigny led a vital supply convoy from Montreal to Michilimackinac. Their success in breaking the Iroquois blockade of the Ottawa River and in resupplying the western Indians loyal to the French may have saved New France from the Five Nations. In subsequent years he was involved in the discovery of lead mines brought to his attention by Miami chiefs.

In 1695 Perrot brought the Miami, Sauk, Menominee, Potawatomi and Meskwaki chiefs to Montreal at the governor's request, regarding war with the Iroquois. Perrot returned west where his concern was to maintain unity and peace among them in their efforts against the Iroquois. However, there was danger, and on two occasions he was almost sent to be burned at the stake by the Mascouten and the Miami tribe.

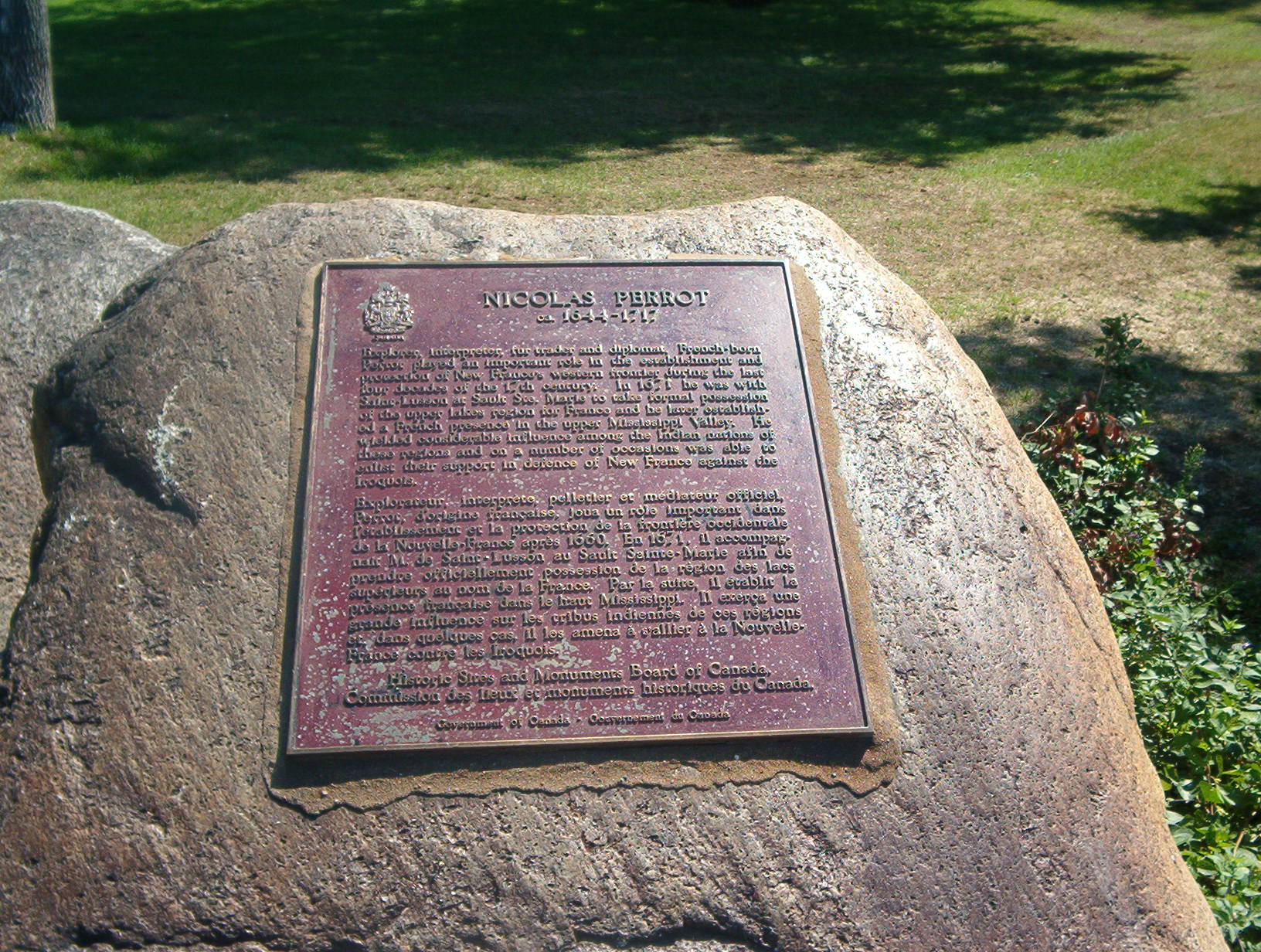
Plaque commemorating Nicolas Perrot, Clergue Park, Sault Ste. Marie, Ontario

Perrot settled on his land grant at Bécancour. The Indian chiefs whom he had known saw him for the last time in 1701 at the Great Peace of Montreal. He still served as interpreter, but this period of his life was marked by financial difficulties and harassment from creditors. He asked the authorities for a compensation he said was due to him, and a pension in consideration of services long provided, but was not satisfied. He was involved in court cases involving lawsuits filed by and against him. He also wrote his memoirs, which became valuable to later historians.

Nicolas Perrot died on the 13th of August 1717 at about the age of 74. He was buried the next day in the church at Bécancour. Nine of his eleven children outlived him. His wife died in 1724.

Perrot State Park, near the confluence of the Trempealeau and Mississippi Rivers in Wisconsin, is named after him.
