= La Baye =

Coordinates: 44°30′48″N 88°0′57″W

La Baye was a small trading post established on the Baie des Puants (modern Green Bay, Wisconsin) in 1634 by Jean Nicolet, and is the same as the modern city of Green Bay, Wisconsin. Nicolas Perrot, who was sent by Father Claude-Jean Allouez, continued the work that Nicolet had started. In 1671, the Jesuits constructed a mission. Fort La Baye was thus constructed in 1717. The town of La Baye was incorporated in 1754. At the end of the Seven Years' War, it went under British control in 1761 and was renamed Green Bay.

By 1718, there were some Métis families in the very broad area of the fort, but no settlement focused on it specifically. Other families settled across the river from the fort in an area which was called Munnomonee, because of the Menominee native people that lived there.

It was not until 1763 that concerted civilian settlement by people with some European ancestry began in the area. The first settlement in that year was led by Charles de Langlade, who was the son of a French-Canadian father and an Odawa mother. Most of the families had come to La Baye from the Mackinac area.

In 1816 La Baye had a population of about 40 families, who were virtually all Métis. In the summer of 1820 La Baye was estimated by Henry Schoolcraft to have 500 inhabitants, all essentially Métis or at least in Métis families, that is even if they could be called clearly French, Odawa, or some other Native American group, their spouse was of a different group.

== See also ==
- Jean Nicolet
- Nicolas Perrot
- Jacques Vieau
- List of Jesuit sites
