= Fort Beauharnois =

1727 New France fur trade post and mission

Coordinates: 44°30′42″N 92°18′55″W

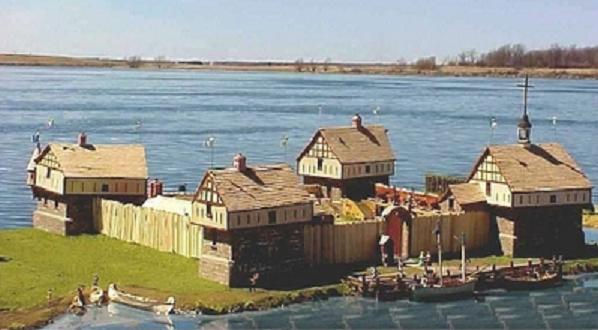
- A model of Fort Beauharnois at the Musée de la civilisation in Quebec City
- Interactive map of Fort Beauharnois
- Location: Florence Township, Goodhue County, Minnesota, USA

History
- Built: 1727
- Rebuilt: 1730

Fort Beauharnois (French pronunciation: [fɔʁ boaʁnwa]) was a French fort, serving as a fur trading post and Catholic mission, built on the shores of Lake Pepin, a wide section of the upper Mississippi River, in 1727. The location chosen was on lowlands and the fort was rebuilt in 1730 on higher ground. It was the site of the first Roman Catholic chapel in what is now Minnesota, which was dedicated to St. Michael the Archangel. The fort was named after the Governor of New France at the time, Charles de Beauharnois. Eventually it was abandoned as the French sent most of their troops to the east to fight the British in the French and Indian War. The Minnesota Department of Transportation inventories a roadside historical marker of the presumed location of the fort along US 61/US 63.

In 1727 two Jesuits, Michael Guignas and Nicholas De Gonnor, built the first church in Minnesota, a log cabin Catholic mission at Fort Beauharnois overlooking Lake Pepin. It was dedicated to St. Michael the Archangel and abandoned in 1756. In 1891 Ursuline nuns built a convent and school at the location, then the Villa Maria Education & Spirituality Center in 1970. It closed in 2016 and is now a boutique hotel/event center on the site of the old fort, in Florence Township of Goodhue County.

== See also ==
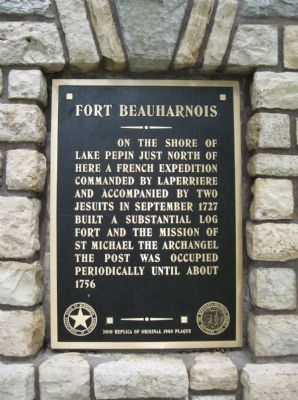
Fort Beauharnois plaque

- Pierre-Charles Le Sueur, one of the first French explorers to visit the upper Mississippi River in 1699
- Jacques Legardeur de Saint-Pierre, commanded the fort from 1734 to May 1737
