= Colonial militia in Canada =

The colonial militias in Canada were made up of various militias prior to Confederation in 1867. During the period of New France and Acadia, Newfoundland Colony, and Nova Scotia (1605–1763), these militias were made up of Canadiens (French Canadians), First Nations, British and Acadians. Traditionally, the Canadian Militia was the name used for the local sedentary militia regiments throughout the Canadas.

However, the term "militia" was also used to refer to the Canadian regular professional land forces, beginning with the passing of the Militia Act of 1855. Passed by the Legislative Assembly of the Province of Canada, the act created the Active Militia, later referred to as the Permanent Active Militia. After PAM's formation, the remaining sedentary colonial militia regiments were collectively referred to as the Non-Permanent Active Militia (NPAM). The terms PAM and NPAM continued to be used in Canada until 1940, when the Canadian militias was reorganized into the Canadian Army. The term Militia is still used to refer to the Canadian Army's part-time Primary Reserve.

== History ==
=== French colonial militia ===
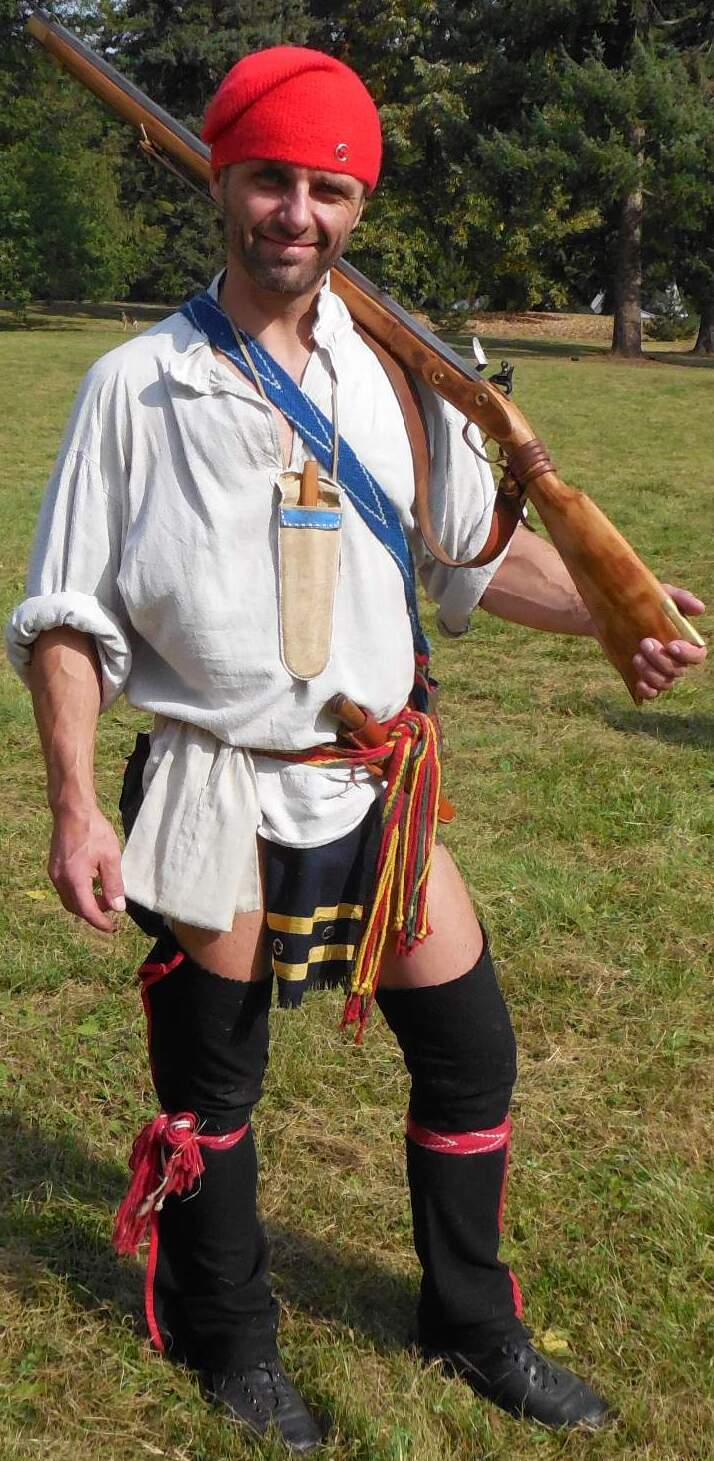
Re-creation of part of the clothing issued to the French colonial militia in the 17th century.

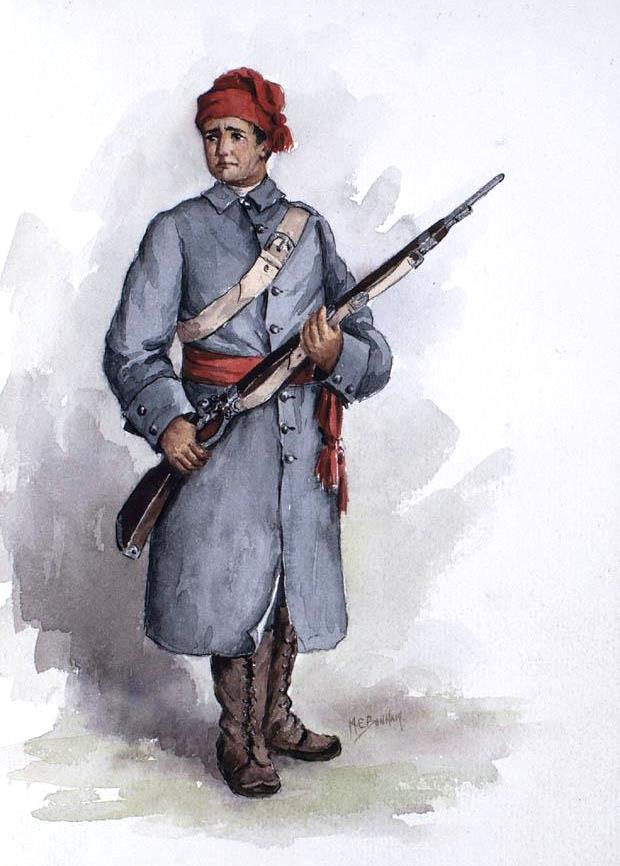
Depiction of a French Canadian militiaman during the Seven Years' War.

Military service has been part of Canadian life since the 17th century in New France, where colonists were required to serve in local militia to support regular units of the French army and navy. In 1651, Pierre Boucher received a commission of captain from the governor of New France and asked to raise militia corps in Trois-Rivières. Until the arrival of the Carignan-Salières Regiment in 1665, militia corps were the only defence of New France. In the long struggle between the French and British colonies, they were organized into companies, usually one per church parish, and structured in the same way as a regular French infantry company. The Governor General, Louis de Buade de Frontenac, arranged during the 1690s to provide all militiamen with clothing and equipment. This consisted generally of a capote, a breechcloth, leggings, a blanket, moccasins, a knife and two shirts, The clothing did not constitute a military uniform but was simply Canadian-style civilian wear. Since these men were not paid, this was a relatively economical way of maintaining an effective militia. British and colonial American troops found that the Indigenous-style tactics (i.e., guerrilla warfare, scalping) of the Canadian militia made them a formidable adversary. Perhaps the two most famous Canadian attacks against New England were the Siege of Pemaquid (1696) and the Raid on Deerfield (1704).

The success of the Canadians was underscored during the French and Indian War by George Washington's defeat at Great Meadows and Edward Braddock's embarrassment at the Monongahela River. The British response was to create new "ranger" and "light infantry" units adept at woodland warfare. When France ceded Canada to Great Britain in 1763, defence of the territory remained a duty shared by Canadian and British colonists, Indian nations, and the regular forces of Britain. As the colonies advanced to nationhood, its people were called to their own defence three times in the next 100 years.

Approximate numbers of militiamen in New France in 1759:

- Acadian Militia – 150 militiamen
- Canadien Cavalry: 200 cavalrymen
- District of Quebec: 5,640 militiamen
- District of Montreal: 5,455 militiamen 4,200 sent to Quebec City
- District of Trois-Rivière: 1,300 militiamen 1,100 to Quebec City
- First Nations: 1,800

==== Acadia ====
Until the establishment of Halifax (1749), the militia units in Acadia (present day Nova Scotia and New Brunswick) were primarily Mi'kmaq, Maliseet and Acadian militia. Before the British Conquest of Acadia in 1710, these militias fought the New Englanders in King William's War and Queen Anne's War. After the conquest, the Mi'kmaq, Acadian and Maliseet militias continued to fight the British through Father Rale's War, King George's War, and Father Le Loutre's War. The two latter wars saw the arrival Gorham's Rangers, the first British militias established in the colony (the British regulars of the 40th Regiment of Foot was raised in the colony 1720). The Mi'kmaq and Acadian militias continued to fight in Nova Scotia throughout the French and Indian War.

=== British colonial militia ===
==== American Revolutionary War ====
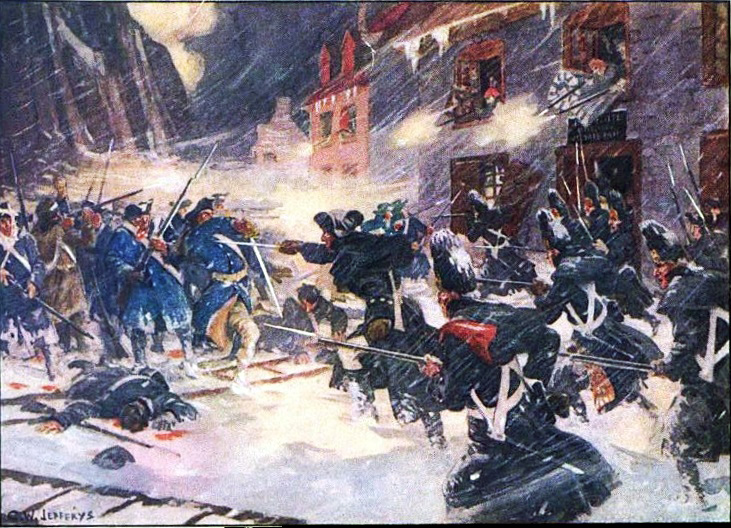
British regulars and the Canadian militia repulse an American assault during the Battle of Quebec.

In 1775, during the American Revolutionary War, plans to invade Canada were drawn up as the first major military initiative by the newly formed Continental Army. The objective of the campaign was to gain military control of the British Province of Quebec (modern day Canada), and convince the French-speaking Canadiens to join the revolution on the side of the Thirteen Colonies. There were only two British regiments in the colony of Quebec. Companies of Canadian volunteers had to be raised to support the regular troops. Pro-American sympathies were a problem among the anglophone company raised by the Montreal merchants. In November 1775, Governor Carleton organized the defenders of Quebec City to face a siege by the American rebels. British regular troops were few in number. Canadian militia, from both the anglophone and francophone communities, made up the majority of the defenders. The militia of Quebec City was divided into two sections in 1775—'Canadian Militia' drawn from the francophone population, and 'British Militia' made up of anglophones. During the siege of Quebec, both were issued with the same uniform: green coat without lapels, with green facings; buff waistcoats and breeches; tricorne hat. The uniforms were drawn from stocks sent from Britain in the summer of 1775 for a proposed but never raised corps of Canadian light infantry.

In the aftermath of the American Revolutionary came an exodus of 40,000 Loyalists into the Canadas, Nova Scotia, and New Brunswick, joined by many of the Six Nations Iroquois who had remained loyal to the United Kingdom. Since many of the new Canadians were also veterans of Loyalist regiments, they brought both the British sympathies and the military training to establish competent professional forces to oppose the perceived American threat. Called "fencibles", the new units were organized within the British army, but charged wholly with the defence of their home colonies. Their professional presence also enhanced training for the citizen militia and established many traditions that continue to modern times.

==== War of 1812 ====
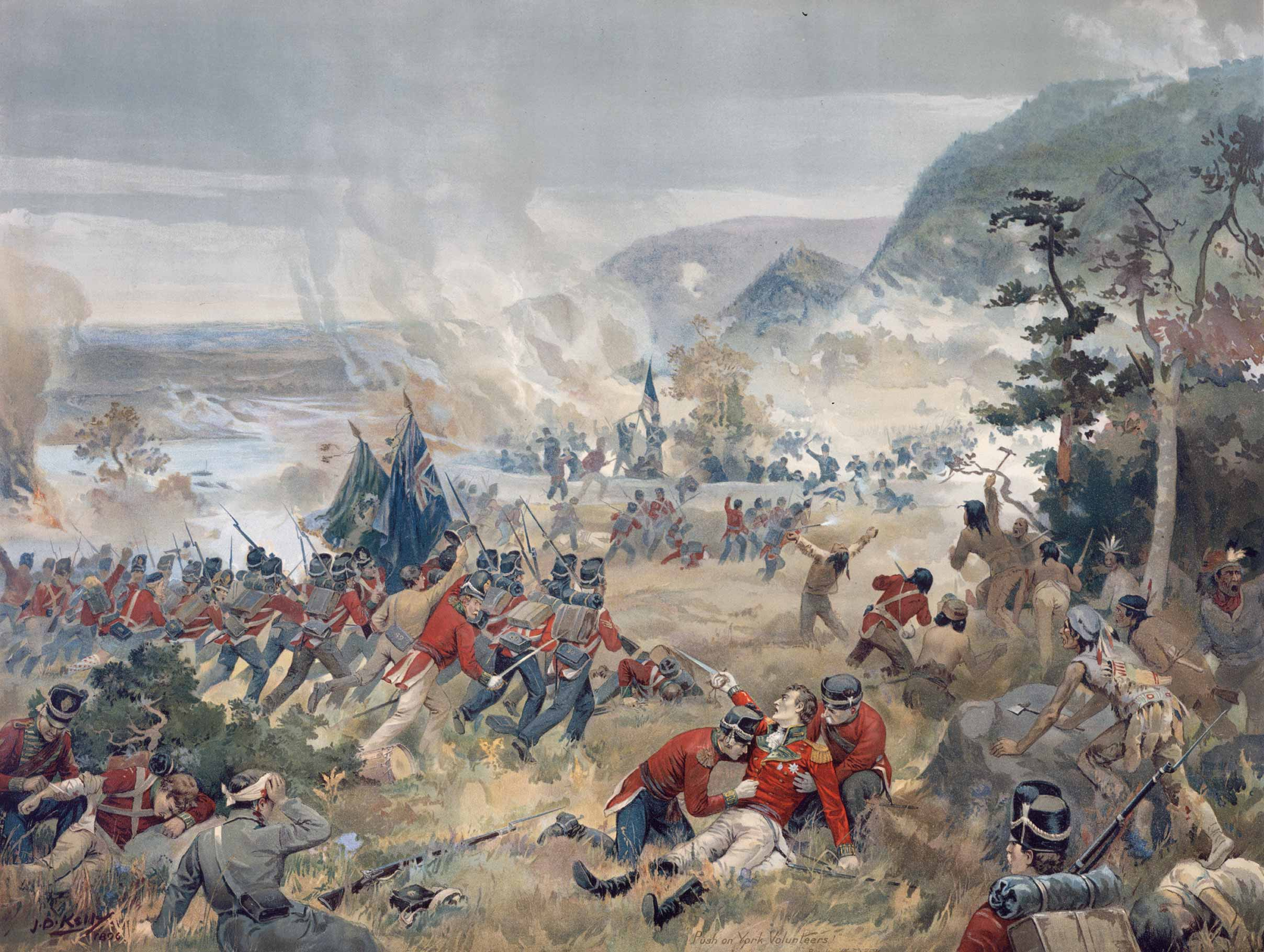
A mortally wounded Isaac Brock urges members of the York Militia forward during the Battle of Queenston Heights.

In 1812, with the United Kingdom engaged in Europe, the United States took the opportunity to declare war and launch another attempt to capture Canada and expand westward into Indian territories. While British redcoats did most of the fighting in the War of 1812, Canadian militia and allied Indian warriors proved to be a vital part of Canada's defence.

The merit of British professional commanders was illustrated by Major-General Sir Isaac Brock in Upper Canada (Ontario) and Lieutenant-Colonel Charles de Salaberry, a French Canadian, in Lower Canada (Quebec). As soon as war was declared, Brock hastened to capture the American post on Lake Huron at Michilimackinac. Besides closing a key crossing on the Great Lakes, his success earned the admiration and loyalty of the Indian leader, Tecumseh. Brock then led a force of his troops along with colonial militia, fencibles and Tecumseh's Indians to capture Fort Detroit, securing the upper Great Lakes.

In the east, the French Canadians fought a crucial battle at Châteauguay, south of Montreal. With only a force of Canadian regulars and militia supported by allied Indians, de Salaberry turned back a larger column of Americans advancing on Montreal.

Brock died a Canadian hero as he repelled the American landing at the Battle of Queenston Heights and Tecumseh was later killed at the Battle of the Thames. Many engagements proved to be bloody but indecisive, including the Battle of Lundy's Lane near Niagara Falls, Ontario, the burning of both York (Toronto) and Washington, and in numerous naval engagements on the Great Lakes. When the war concluded in 1815, nothing material had changed for the European powers. The Treaty of Ghent restored all pre-war boundaries. Canadians, meanwhile, discovered the seeds of nationhood in their victories and their sacrifices, while their allies, the Indian nations, saw their hopes for secure boundaries of their own vanish.

==== Rebellions of 1837–1838 ====
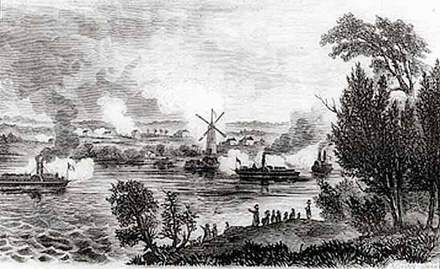
Battle of the Windmill, as seen from the American shore

The militia were actively engaged in the Rebellions of 1837–1838, as well as the aftermath of the Patriot War, which involved American groups invading the Canadas, such as the Battle of the Windmill.

==== Fenian Raids ====
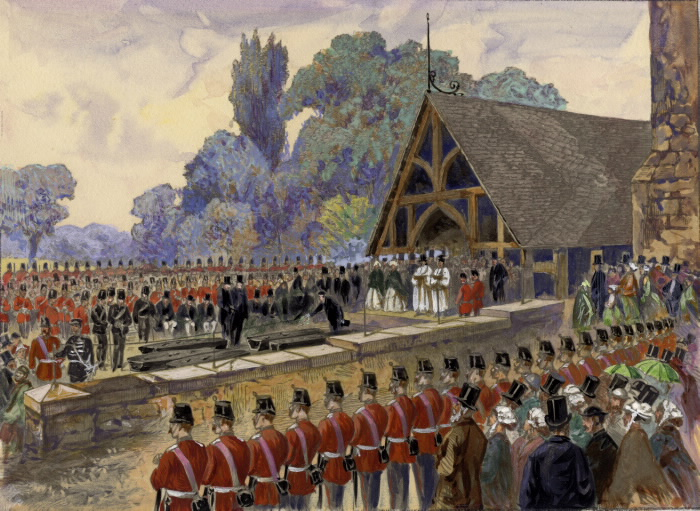
Funeral for Canadian Volunteer Militia members killed during the Battle of Ridgeway.

In 1855, the Parliament of the Province of Canada passed the Militia Act, which authorized the raising of an initial force of 5,000 (later increased to 10,000) regulars. The act was passed to raise an active force of militia which could partially compensate for the withdrawal of British regulars as a result of the Crimean War. Although additional British troops were re-deployed to Canada to deter a potential Union invasion during the American Civil War, this force played an instrumental role in the defence of Canada from that point forward.

Founded in the mid-19th century, the Fenian Brotherhood was an association of Irish-American veterans of the American Civil War who plotted to gain Ireland independence from British rule by attacking Britain's overseas colonies within striking distance. In response, 20,000 Canadians volunteered for militia service, many from the Orange Order. Several hundred soldiers were quickly deployed from nearby Toronto, many of them coming from The Queen's Own Rifles of Canada. In Hamilton, the 13th Battalion (today's Royal Hamilton Light Infantry) mobilized over two hundred soldiers for frontier service.

The first serious raid came in June 1866 with 850 Fenians attacking at Ridgeway in the Niagara region, then withdrawing quickly back across the border. This was the largest and best-organized raid, and militia units, again primarily the Queen's Own Rifles and Hamilton's 13th Battalion, were called out. The engagement ended with Fenian victory at Ridgeway, but the Fenians withdrew back to the United States through Fort Erie, where another skirmish was fought before the invaders withdrew across the Niagara River. Militia units skirmished with the Fenians sporadically until 1871. The raids ended after unsuccessful attacks during the Battle of Eccles Hill in Quebec and in the northwest frontier, near the Manitoba border. The Fenians accomplished little, but the Canadian colonies came to recognize a shared need for a vigilant and coordinated defence: a key factor leading to a confederation of the provinces into one country in 1867.

== Equipment ==
Model/Type	Period or Years in Use	Manufacturer/Origins
Charleville 1717		France
Charleville 1728		France
Charleville 1746		France
Fusil de Grenadier Tulle		France
Fusil de Chasse Tulle		France
Queen Ann Musket	1702–1714	United Kingdom
William III Carbine		United Kingdom
Nock Carbine	1780–1790s	United Kingdom
Elliot Carbine	1770s	United Kingdom
Brown Bess Long Land, Short Land, India Patterns		United Kingdom
Lovells Pattern 1838 musket and Double Barrel Carbine		United Kingdom
Pattern 1842 Musket		United Kingdom
Pattern 1851 Rifle		United Kingdom
Pattern 1853 Enfield		United Kingdom
Lancaster Rifle		United Kingdom
Baker rifle		United Kingdom
Brunswick rifle		United Kingdom
Starr Carbine	1860s	United States
Spencer rifle and carbine	1860s	United States
Westley Richards Rifle		United Kingdom
Peabody Rifle		United Kingdom
Snider Enfield	1860s–1901	United Kingdom

== Forts ==
Forts were utilized by both French and British militia units throughout Canada's colonial history. The following forts built by the authorities of New France were used by its military, including its militia units:

Name	Present location	Historic colony	Established
Citadelle of Quebec	Quebec City, Quebec	Canada, New France	1673
Fort Beauséjour	Aulac, New Brunswick	Acadia, New France	1751
Fort Carillon	Ticonderoga, New York	Canada, New France	1755
Fort Chambly	La Vallée-du-Richelieu, Quebec	Canada, New France	1675
Fort de la Montagne	Montreal, Quebec	Canada, New France	1685
Fort Duquesne	Pittsburgh, Pennsylvania	Louisiana, New France	1754
Fort Frontenac	Kingston, Ontario	Canada, New France	1673
Fort Gaspareaux	Strait Shores	Acadia, New France	1751
Fort Laprairie	La Prairie, Quebec	Canada, New France	1687
Fort Lévis	Ogdensburg, New York	Canada, New France	1759
Fort Menagoueche	Saint John, New Brunswick	Acadia, New France	1751
Fort Niagara	Youngstown, New York	Canada, New France	1678
Fort Plaisance	Plaisance, Newfoundland	Newfoundland	1662
Fort Richelieu	La Vallée-du-Richelieu, Quebec	Canada, New France	1641
Fort Rouillé	Toronto, Ontario	Canada, New France	1750
Fort Royal	Placentia, Newfoundland	Newfoundland	1687
Fort Saint-Jean	Saint John, New Brunswick	Acadia, New France	1666
Fort Saint Louis	Plaisance, Newfoundland	Newfoundland	1662
Fort Senneville	Sainte-Anne-de-Bellevue, Quebec	Canada, New France	1671
Fortress of Louisbourg	Louisbourg, Nova Scotia	Île-Royale, New France	1713
The Citadel	Montreal, Quebec	Canada, New France	1690

Military fortifications continued to be used by the British after the conquest of 1760. In addition to using the forts already built by the previous French regime, the British Army, and Canadian militia units, also built their own fortifications. The following British-built fortifications were used by members of the Canadian militia:

Name	Present location	Historic colony (Note: Colonial administration at the time of the fortification's establishment.)	Established
Fort Amherst	St. John's, Newfoundland	Newfoundland	1770
Fort Amherstburg	Amherstburg, Ontario	Upper Canada	1796
Fort Anne	Annapolis Royal, Nova Scotia	Colony of Nova Scotia	1629
Citadel Hill	Halifax, Nova Scotia	Colony of Nova Scotia	1749
Fort de l'Île Sainte-Hélène	Montreal, Quebec	Lower Canada	1820s
Fort Frederick	Kingston, Ontario	Province of Canada	1846
Fort Frederick	Placentia, Newfoundland	Newfoundland	1721
Fort George	Niagara-on-the-Lake, Ontario	Upper Canada	1796
Fort Henry	Kingston, Ontario	Upper Canada	1812
Fort Howe	Saint John, New Brunswick	Colony of Nova Scotia	1777
Fort Lawrence	Fort Lawrence, Nova Scotia	Colony of Nova Scotia	1750
Fort Lennox	Saint-Paul-de-l'Île-aux-Noix, Quebec	Lower Canada	1819
Fort Mississauga	Niagara-on-the-Lake, Ontario	Upper Canada	1814
Fort Point	Trinity, Newfoundland	Newfoundland	1744
Fort Townshend	St. John's, Newfoundland	Newfoundland	1775
Fort Waldegrave	St. John's, Newfoundland	Newfoundland	1798
Fort William	St. John's, Newfoundland	Newfoundland	1698
Fort Wellington	Prescott, Ontario	Upper Canada	1813
Fort York	Toronto, Ontario	Upper Canada	1793
Lévis Forts	Lévis, Quebec	Province of Canada	1865
New Fort York	Toronto, Ontario	Province of Canada	1840
Signal Hill	St. John's, Newfoundland	Newfoundland	1762
York Redoubt	Halifax, Nova Scotia	Colony of Nova Scotia	1793

== See also ==
- Canadian Armed Forces
- Military history of the Mi'kmaq
- Provincial Marine
