= Corisande (given name) =

Name list

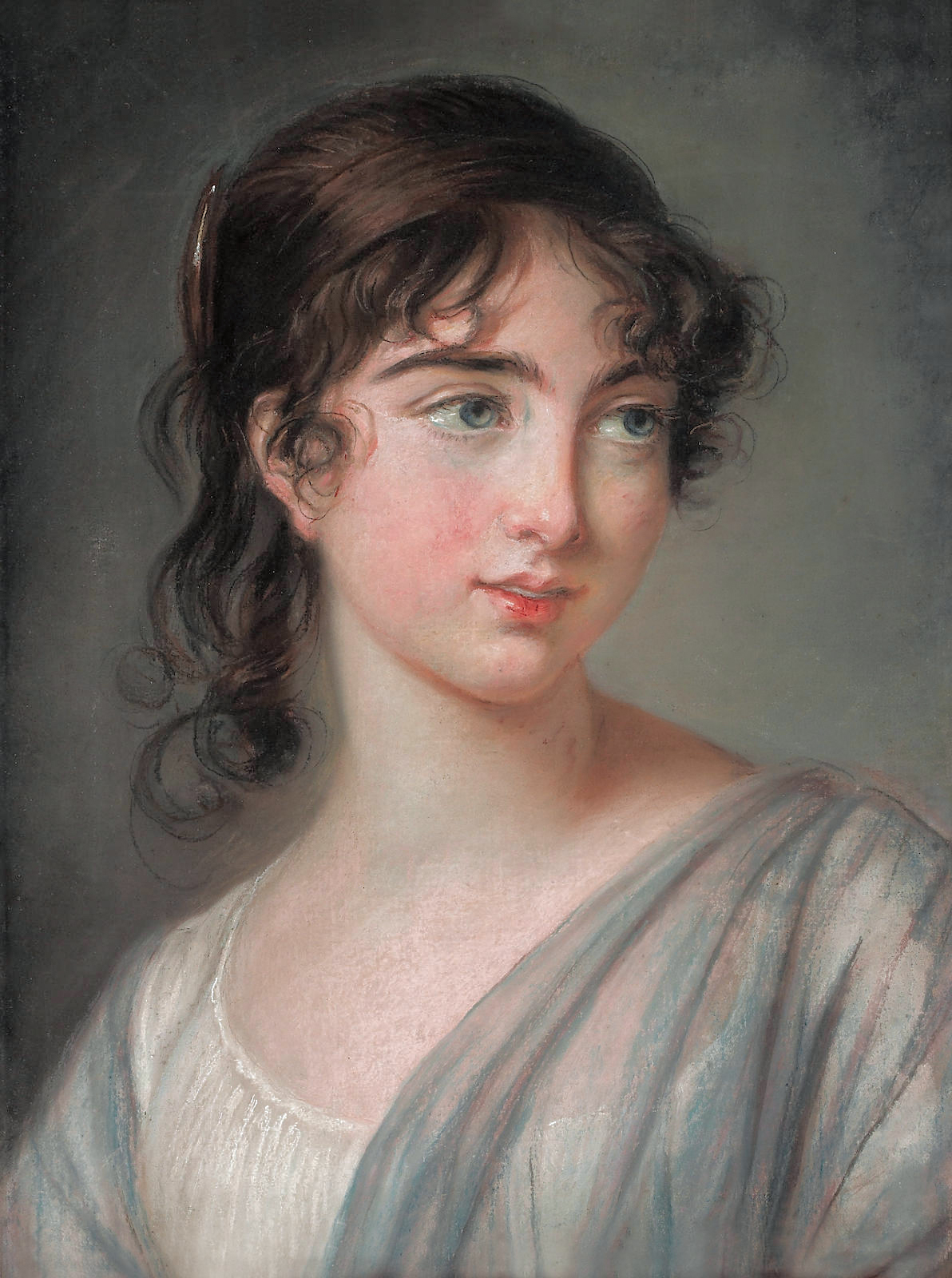
- Portrait by Élisabeth Vigée Le Brun c. 1800
- Gender: Female
- Language: Greek language

Origin
- Meaning: Chorus-Singer

Other names
- See also: Charmian, Araminta, Cressida, Cosima

Corisande is a feminine given name. The name comes from the language of Greek, Corisande means "chorus-singer."

== People ==
Notable people with the name include:

- Antoinette Corisande Élisabeth de Gramont (1875–1954), Duchess of Clermont-Tonnerre
- Corisande de Gramont (1782–1865), Countess of Tankerville
- Corisande Emma Bennet (1807–1876), Daughter of Charles Bennet, 5th Earl of Tankerville
- Corisande Emma Louise Ida de Gramont (1880–1977), Marchioness of Noailes
- Corisande Olivia Bennet (1855–1941), Daughter of Charles Bennet, 6th Earl of Tankerville
- Diane d'Andoins La Belle Corisande (1554–1621), Countess of Guiche and Mistress of Henry IV of France.
