= Battle of Placentia (1692) =

1692 battle of King William's War

- Part of King William's War
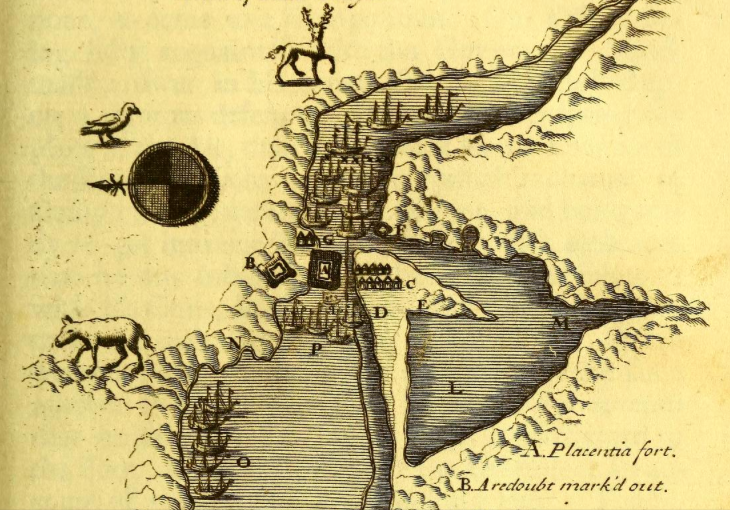
- Depiction of the battle, with the English fleet south of the Fort Saint Louis, and the French fleet north of it
| Date | 16–21 September 1692 |
| Location | Placentia, Newfoundland |
| Result | French victory |

Belligerents
| France | England |

Commanders and leaders
| Philippe Pastour de Costebelle; Louis Armand, Baron de Lahontan; Jacques-François de Monbeton de Brouillan | Thomas Gillam |

Strength
| 50 | 500 |

Casualties and losses
| 1 WIA | 6 KIA |

The Battle of Placentia (1692) was fought between the English and the French at Fort St. Louis (Castle Hill) in Placentia, Newfoundland and Labrador during King William's War. The battle lasted from 16 September until 21 September 1692.

== Background ==
In order to protect the bay, there was one fort erected, Fort Plaisance (1662) (also known as Vieux Fort) between 1662 and 1690.

During King William's War, on 25 February 1690, 45 British freebooters from Ferryland led by Herman Williamson attacked Plaisance by land. After killing two soldiers and wounding governor Louis de Pastour de Costebelle, they took possession of the town and destroyed the fort. The population was imprisoned in the church for six weeks, until the English left on 5 April with the colony's supplies.

The French replaced the former fort with Fort Saint-Louis in 1691, and was manned by 50 soldiers.

== Battle ==
On 16 September, five English vessels anchored just outside the range of the French cannon at Placentia. An estimated 500 disembarked from the ships to go ashore. On 18 September, Commodore Thomas Gillam (Williams) of HMS St Albans called upon Governor Jacques-François de Monbeton de Brouillan to surrender. The Governor refused. On 19 September, the English fired upon the fort and its garrison of only 50. Philippe Pastour de Costebelle (brother of former Governor Louis) and Louis-Armand de Lom d'Arce de Lahontan, Baron de Lahontan led the defence of the garrison. The French killed six English in the defence of the fort and one French soldier was wounded. The seamen of the visiting French ships held off a landing and the English squadron withdrew on 21 September after burning the houses at Point Verde.

== Aftermath ==
In August 1693, Admiral Francis Wheler with 19 ships did not attack the fort for fear that the fort was too strong.

== See also ==
- Battle of Placentia (disambiguation)
