= Battle of Placentia =

Battle of Placentia may refer to:

- Battle of Placentia (217 BC), fought between the Roman Republic and the Carthaginians
- Battle of Placentia (194 BC), fought between the Roman Republic and the Boii
- Battle of Placentia (69), fought between forces of the Emperor Otho and his opponent Vitellius
- Battle of Placentia (271), fought Between the Roman Empire and the Juthungi
- Battle of Placentia (456), fought between forces of the Emperor Avitus and his opponents Majorian and Ricimer
- Battle of Placentia (1692), fought between the English and the French in Placentia, Newfoundland
- Battle of Piacenza (1746), fought between the Franco-Spanish and Austria
