= Castle Hill, Newfoundland and Labrador =

Fortification in Placentia, Newfoundland and Labrador, Canada

Coordinates: 47°15′3.88″N 53°58′17.31″W

Castle Hill
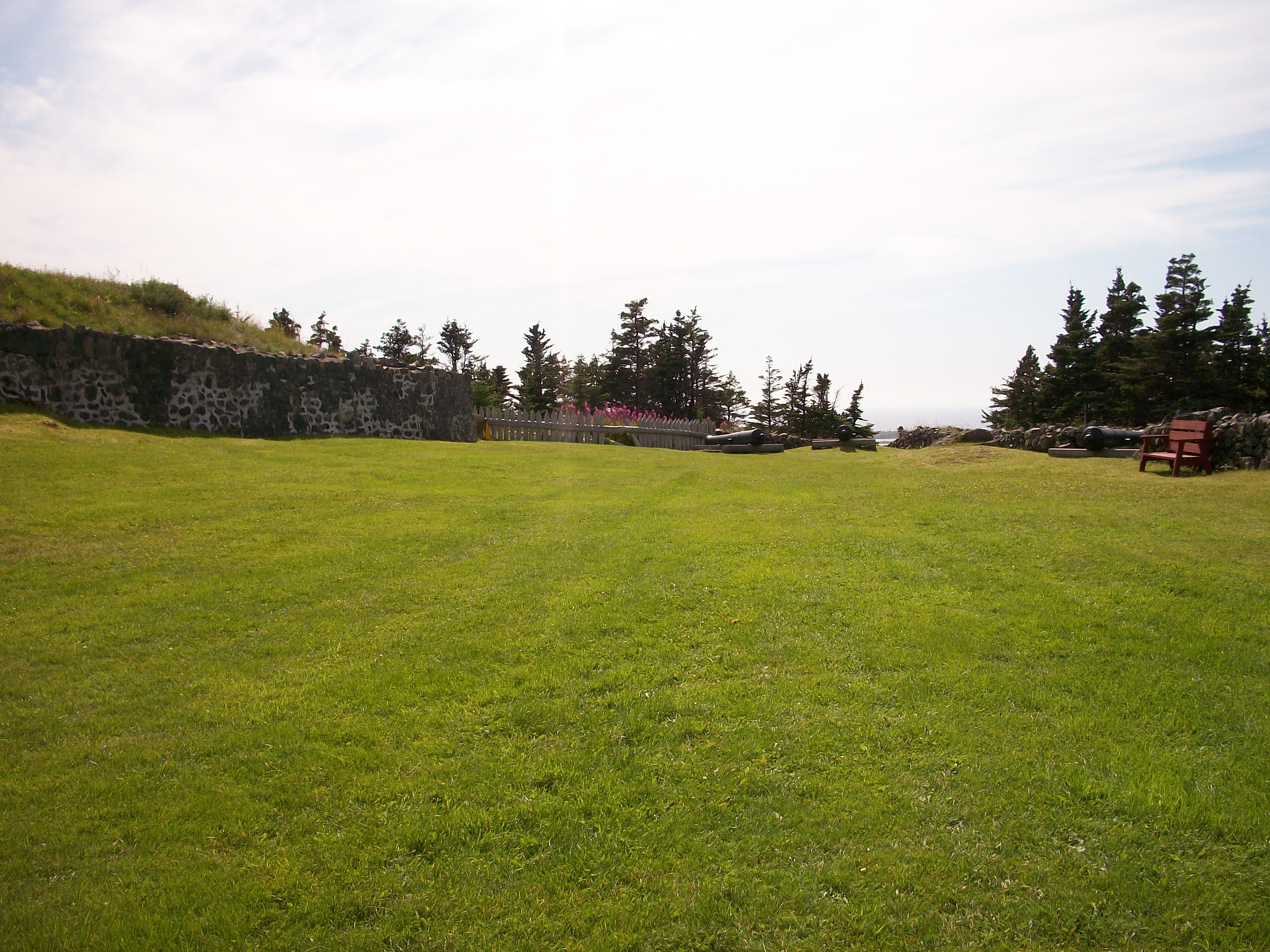
- Fort Royal
- Established: 1662
- Location: Placentia, Newfoundland and Labrador, Canada.
- Type: Historic fortifications
- Website: www.pc.gc.ca/en/lhn-nhs/nl/castlehill

National Historic Site of Canada
- Official name: Castle Hill National Historic Site of Canada
- Designated: 1968

Castle Hill is an area containing the remains of both French and British fortifications, overlooking the town of Placentia (French: Plaisance) in Newfoundland and Labrador, Canada. The site was originally established in order to protect the French fishing interests in Terre-Neuve (Newfoundland) and the approaches to the French colony of Canada.

== King William's War ==
In order to protect the bay, there was one fort erected, Fort Plaisance (1662) (also known as Vieux Fort) between 1662 and 1690.

During King William's War, on 25 February 1690, 45 British freebooters from Ferryland led by Herman Williamson attacked Plaisance by land. After killing two soldiers and wounding governor Louis de Pastour de Costebelle, they took possession of the town and destroyed the fort. The population was imprisoned in the church for six weeks, until the English left on 5 April with the colony's supplies.

The French replaced former Fort Plaisance with Fort Saint-Louis (1691), with 50 French soldiers. In the fall of 1692, in the Battle of Placentia (1692), under the command of Commodore Thomas Gillam (Williams), five English ships armed with 62 cannon and 800 men. The English damaged several houses with cannon fire, and on 23 September the fleet withdrew. The French made attacks on St. John's in 1692 and 1694.

Fort Royal was built in 1693. French forces successfully raided British settlements during times of war while Fort Royal, atop Castle Hill, protected the colony from attack by British warships. At the end of 1693 the garrison had about 60 soldiers. Governor Jacques-François de Monbeton de Brouillan (1691–97) mobilized a frigate and eight ships to attack English Newfoundland. He took possession of about 30 fishing boats, captured prisoners and seized a large amount of fish. De Monbeton was joined on this expedition by Pierre Le Moyne d'Iberville, who marched overland from Plaisance to spearhead a punishing attack on the English settlements in a famous Avalon Peninsula Campaign. A strong British relief force of 1500 troops reoccupied St. John's in the summer of 1697: they found the town abandoned, pillaged and every building destroyed. The following year construction was begun at St. John's on a well-engineered fortification - Fort William - which was completed in 1700.

== Queen Anne's War ==
During Queen Anne's War, the arrival of Governor Daniel d'Auger de Subercase in 1702 was beneficial. By giving seniority leave, he got rid of the undisciplined soldiers, and a grievance was removed when soldiers were supplied with free uniforms. The garrison was reinforced with Mi'kmaq, and privateers provided some defence at sea. In 1705, Subercase attacked the English settlements. This expedition was a great success - only St. John's and Carbonear successfully resisted. Subercase had almost 500 regulars, French Canadians and Indians. He took the town of St. John, but the Fort William garrison held out and refused terms. After a five-week siege, Subercase retired to Placentia with all the booty his men and several hundred captive townspeople could carry. That summer, detachments of French and Indians attacked and burned out all English communities in Conception, Trinity and Bonavista Bays. Sporadic attacks continued throughout 1706, despite British reinforcement of the St. John's garrison.

In 1708, England blockaded Plaisance to starve the capital, which also contained 500 English prisoners. Despite the blockade, Joseph de Monbeton de Brouillan de Saint-Ovide, king's lieutenant to Philippe Pastour de Costebelle, attacked English settlements and in January 1709, with a force of 170 men, French, Canadians and Indians, he took St. John's, captured 800 prisoners and destroyed the town's defences.

The garrison numbered 250 by 1711. Governor Brouillan had previously estimated that the colony needed at least 300 soldiers to ensure an effective defence.

In 1713, the French gave up their right to settlement in Newfoundland and established a new stronghold at Louisbourg on Cape Breton Island. British settlers replaced the French and their soldiers garrisoned the fortifications until 1811.

== Father Rale's War ==
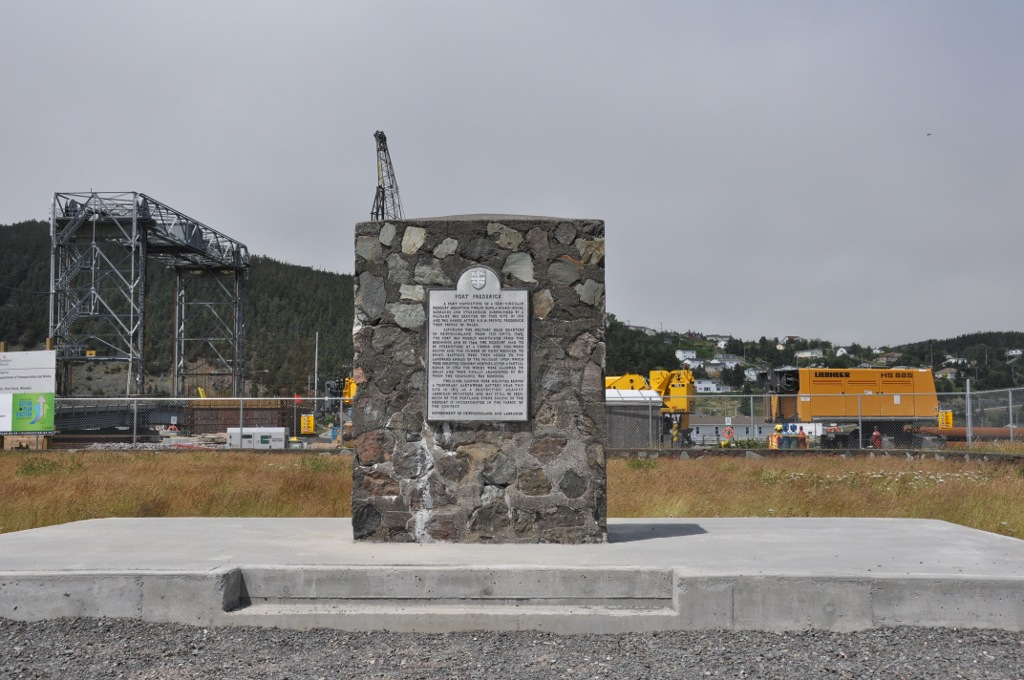
Fort Frederick

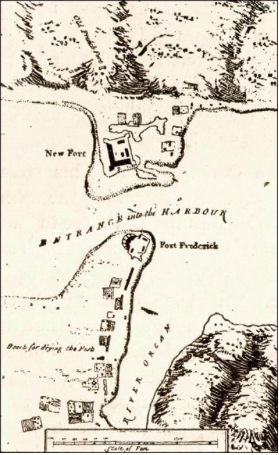
Fort Frederick Newfoundland Map

After briefly occupying Fort Louis, under the command of Samuel Gledhill, the British built the redoubt Fort Frederick (Newfoundland) to help fortify their acquisition of Placentia. It served as the military headquarters for Newfoundland from 1721 to 1746. There was a report that the Mi'kmaq were involved in a raid of Pleasance during Father Rale's War in which they were said to have killed 200 English. Governor Drummer did not believe the report.

By the 1740s, the British began construction of New Fort which overlaid the former Fort Louis.

== Castle Hill National Historic Site ==
Designated a National Historic Site in 1968, after years of archeological projects, today the ruins of the fort are managed by Parks Canada, and known as Castle Hill National Historic Site.

Key elements of the site today:

- Remains of the walls of Gaillardin Redoubt (1692),
- Fort Royal (1693–1703) and detached Redoubt (1697)
- La Fontaine Battery (1697) – unexcavated remains
- remains of British blockhouse (1762)
- Horseshoe Battery – unexcavated remains
- 6 smoothbore cannons – added 1930s

The visitor center features exhibits about the history of the fort, and the lives of the fishing families and soldiers who lived there.

== Legacy ==
On 28 June 1985 Canada Post issued 'Castle Hill, Nfld., circa 1762' one of the 20 stamps in the "Forts Across Canada Series" (1983 & 1985). The stamps are perforated 12 1/2 x 13 mm and were printed by Ashton-Potter Limited based on the designs by Rolf P. Harder.

== Units at the garrison ==
- British Army
- French Army
- Independent Companies of Foot (1713–1718)
- Independent Company of Artillery (1713–1726)
- Ordnance Engineers (Royal Engineers) 1714–1870
- Phillip's Regiment of Foot – Ex. Independent Coys Placentia, 40th Regiment of Foot, 1st. Battalion South Lancashire Regiment (1718–1764)
- 1st. Battalion Royal Artillery – Ex. Independent Company of Artillery (1726–1756)
