= Terre-Neuve (New France) =

French colony in North America from 1655 to 1713

- 1658–1713
- Flag

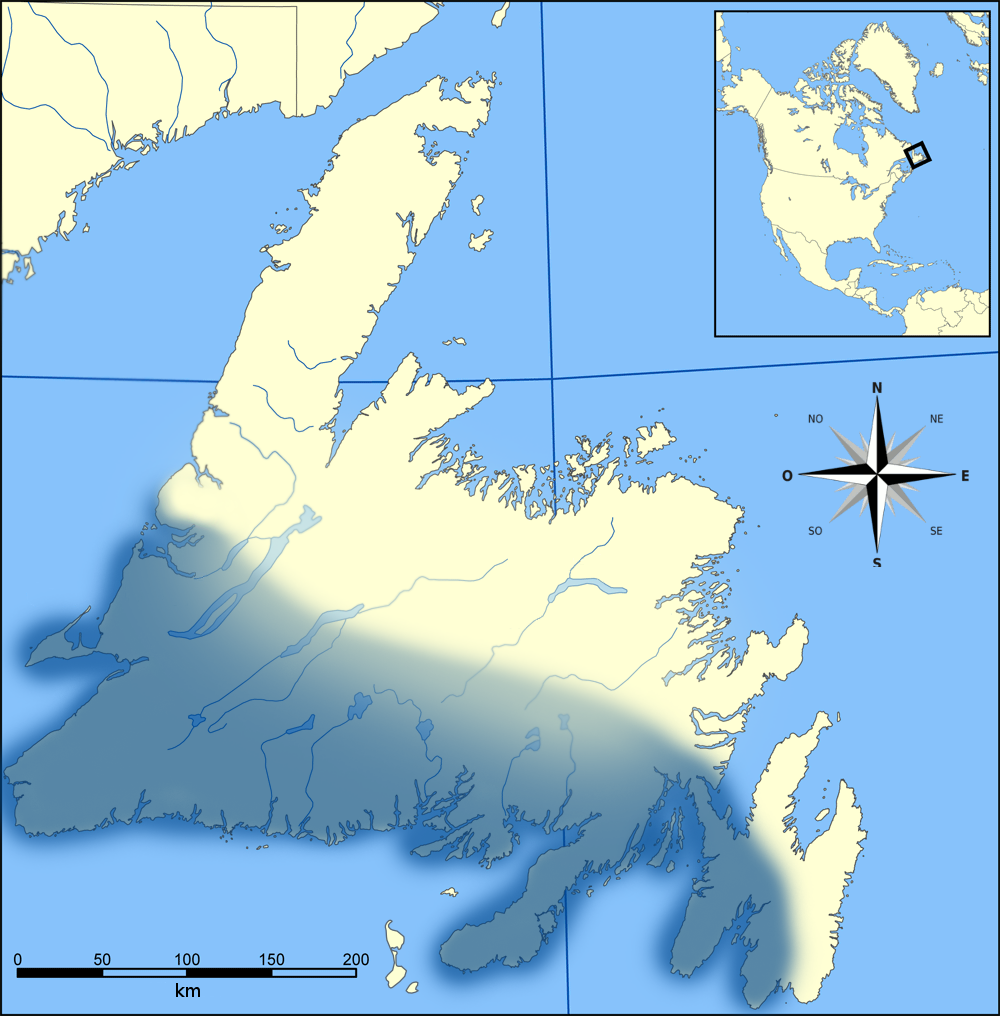
- Terre-Neuve roughly covered the southern half of Newfoundland
- Status: Colony of France within New France
- Capital: Placentia
- Common languages: French
- Religion: Catholic Church (state religion)
- Government: Monarchy
- King
- Governor
- History
  - First Governor: 1658
  - Founding of Placentia: 1662
  - Ceded to Britain: 1713
- Currency: New France livre
Preceded by	Succeeded by
Newfoundland Colony	Newfoundland Colony; French Shore
- Today part of: Canada, France

Terre-Neuve (French pronunciation: [tɛʁ nœv], "Newfoundland") was a colony in New France that existed from 1655 to 1713, and which consisted of the southern portion of Newfoundland island (the northern portion being claimed by England). The most, and sometimes only, populated region was Placentia, called "Plaisance" in French. Because of Placentia's geographic position, its main economic activity was fishing, and the settlement could serve as a pit stop for ships traveling to and from France and other New France colonies like Canada or Acadia. Terre-Neuve ceased to exist in 1713, when France evacuated its settlers and transplanted them to Cape Breton. But, France regained the Saint Pierre and Miquelon islands of this colony in 1763, and still has possession over them today.

== Beginnings ==
Starting from the 15th century, the Great Banks was fished in by Europeans of various nationalities, usually for Atlantic cod. Therefore, the area was already well known to France in the 1600s.

As the French started to desire to compete more effectively with the English in Newfoundland, Placentia Bay was thought to be a good base. Unlike other areas in Newfoundland, the bay is free of ice by early spring, so fishing activity could start there earlier. It was also a convenient sheltering place for those going to or returning from Canada, Acadia, the English North American colonies or the West Indies. So, in 1655, France formally formed Terre-Neuve, and in 1658, France named Nicolas Gargot as its first Governor. In 1662, France founded the Placentia settlement.

The early period of 1662 to 1670 was a difficult beginning, but the colony grew from 1670 to 1702. This is because, from the start, costs of importing goods from France were high. Since importing from the New World was less expensive and more reliable, an illicit trade network came into existence by 1676, most likely preventing the colony's collapse during wartime. From about 1706 onward, Plaisance drew a large part of its annual supply from Quebec City and New England.

== Defense of the colony ==
Defending the colony against the English was paramount, so several forts were erected, including Fort Plaisance in 1662, Fort Royal in 1687, and Fort Saint-Louis in 1690.

Despite the small militias, the colony managed to hold its own against numerous English attacks during two major wars: the War of the League of Augsburg (1688–1697) and the War of Spanish Succession (1702–1712). During the War of the League of Augsburg, in 1690, Placentia was attacked by English filibusters. In 1691, the English attempted a new attack but failed as the counter-attack launched by the Governor, Francois de Brouillan, succeeded in ransacking St. John's. Following the signing of the Treaty of Ryswick, England would get dominion over most of Newfoundland, but France kept Placentia Bay.

After 1702, the colony found itself in a difficult period both economically and politically because of the War of Spanish Succession.

== End and aftermath ==
Following the signing of the Treaty of Utrecht in 1713, at the end of the Spanish War of Succession, Terre-Neuve was ceded to Britain and France was contractually obligated to evacuate French settlers from the area. Buildings were abandoned and left to rot. French settlers from Terre-Neuve were transplanted to Cape Breton (called "Ile Royale" by the French) to found Louisbourg. France kept the right to fish on the French Shore, however. France would also regain the Saint Pierre and Miquelon islands in 1763, and has had dominion over them ever since.

== See also ==
- History of Newfoundland
- List of governors of Newfoundland and Labrador
