= Cosima (disambiguation) =

Cosima is a feminine given name.

Cosima may also refer to:

- Cosima (album), a 2004 album by Australian singer Cosima De Vito
- Cosima (novel), a posthumous novel by Italian writer Grazia Deledda
- 644 Cosima, an asteroid
- COSIMA (Cometary Secondary Ion Mass Analyser), a science experiment on board the Rosetta spacecraft
- Consortium for Ocean-Sea Ice Modelling in Australia or COSIMA (for short)

== See also ==
- Cosimo (disambiguation)
