= Patricia Murphy (restaurateur) =

American restaurateur (1905–1979)

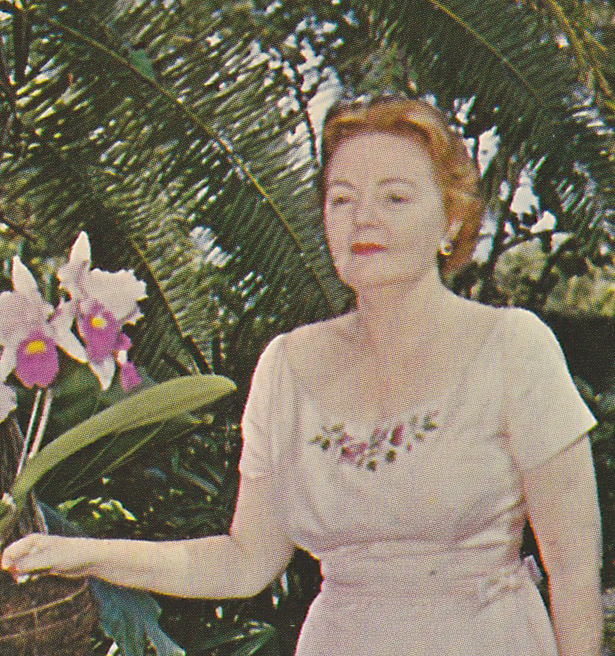
- Patricia Murphy at her Candlelight Restaurant in Fort Lauderdale, Florida.
- Born: Ellen Murphy; October 5, 1905; Placentia, Colony of Newfoundland
- Died: November 23, 1979 (aged 74); Fort Lauderdale, Florida, U.S.
- Known for: Founder, Patricia Murphy's Candlelight Restaurants

Patricia Murphy (1905–1979) was a restaurateur who operated nine Patricia Murphy Candlelight restaurants in New York and Florida over the course of half a century. Shortly after the Wall Street Crash of 1929, she invested her last $60 in a small Brooklyn restaurant. Soon she was one of the most successful restaurant owners in the New York area, serving a million meals a year in 1956. Her signature item was the popover, a hot bread dispensed from baskets by costumed servers known as popover girls.

Murphy recounted what she called her "female Horatio Alger" story in her 1961 autobiography, Glow of Candlelight, which set a New York City record for sales of autographed books at Macy's in Herald Square.

== Early life ==
Murphy, who misrepresented her age in her autobiography and elsewhere, was born Ellen Murphy in 1905 in Placentia, Newfoundland. She was the first of eight children born to Frederick Francis Murphy and Mary Griffiths Murphy. Her father was the town's leading merchant, she wrote. His general store, Murphy & Sons, outfitted the local fishermen with, she said, "everything from a needle to an anchor." She was educated at a Roman Catholic boarding school for girls, St. Michael's Academy in St. George's, Newfoundland.

Her father's business, dependent on the fishermen's production of processed fish for payment, was forced to close when the price of dried salt cod fell precipitously. Three years later, Murphy left Newfoundland, joining thousands of others who were leaving the island for economic reasons.

== First restaurants ==
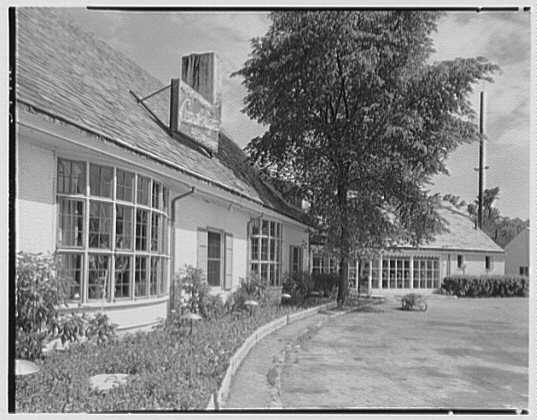
"Candlelight Restaurant" in Manhasset, Long Island (1951)

In 1928 Murphy sailed for New York, planning to continue her music studies while staying with a well-off great-uncle on Staten Island. Lured by Manhattan, she soon struck off on her own, playing piano for a while at a cafeteria near Columbia University, where she'd befriended students. Unfamiliar with American popular songs, she failed to please her audience but earned a few dollars dishing out food. She was fired from a subsequent job as a restaurant cashier because of her confusion over U.S. coins. With the Great Depression under way and jobs hard to find, she began coloring picture postcards for subsistence wages.

In late 1929 she noticed the closing of a restaurant near her Brooklyn Heights boarding house and risked her last funds to take it over. Because her makeshift décor included candles on the tables, she called it the Candlelight.

After the repeal of Prohibition in 1933, the Candlelight in Brooklyn added a cocktail lounge. Expanding from the building's basement into its upper floors, the restaurant eventually had five dining rooms and a summer garden, serving 500 customers daily.

In 1938 Murphy rented space for a second Patricia Murphy's Candlelight Restaurant at 33 East 60th Street. At that time, she wrote, she was losing interest in operating the Brooklyn restaurant and needed the challenge of Manhattan to restore her enthusiasm. In Manhattan she began by taking over a former tea room with a clientele composed largely of working women, whom she described as a significant new category of restaurant-goers.

After buying the East 60th Street building from her landlords, as well as an adjacent building, she added a bar and quadrupled seating. In 1946, Clementine Paddleford, a food writer for the New York Herald Tribune, wrote that "pretty girls" served popovers "unendingly," dispensing one thousand daily at the Manhattan Candlelight. Paddleford described the restaurant's salad bar as a special feature and said dinners were "simple, plain-American – good!" Beef, lamb, and calf's liver were available "plain roasted as you do at home" or "plain broiled" with "no lathering of strange sauces," Paddleford said, adding that by this time Murphy was serving a half million diners annually at her two locations.

== Growth in the New York Suburbs ==
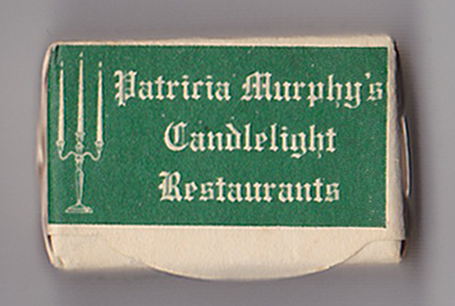
A sugar cube from one of Patricia Murphy's Candlelight Restaurants

Following the postwar exodus from the city to the suburbs, Murphy in 1950 leased a former golf clubhouse in Manhasset, N.Y., on the north shore of Long Island. She made extensive renovations to the interior, with lighting by Richard Kelly, who later designed the illumination of the Four Seasons restaurant in Manhattan. The restaurant was instantly successful, but by 1954 Murphy had sold it, along with her two city restaurants. The buyers of her Manhasset eatery purchased the rights to her name and for 25 more years continued to operate it as Patricia Murphy's Candlelight Restaurant. The Brooklyn restaurant was called simply the Candlelight under its new ownership.

Using proceeds from the sale of her first three restaurants, Murphy invested one million dollars into the construction of her largest Candlelight restaurant in affluent Westchester County. Built on ten acres of land in Yonkers, with award-winning gardens a large parking lot and an artificial lake, the Westchester Candlelight was said to be the largest restaurant in the East. It seated almost a thousand customers while nearly as many were often waiting for tables. Serving was continuous, and 10,000 customers sometimes ate at the restaurant on a single day, according to Murphy. Engineered to maximize sales, the Westchester Candlelight invited diners enduring long waits to stroll its extensive gardens, browse at a gift shop featuring Patricia Murphy-branded fragrances, and buy drinks at the bar or flowers in the greenhouses. Charter buses from upstate New York and Pennsylvania arrived regularly with tour groups.

In 1955 Murphy was profiled in a magazine for investors published by Merrill Lynch. She told the interviewer, "I have made a few million," and reported profit margins of 15% to 17%.

== Florida restaurants and development deal ==
In 1959 Murphy leased a fifth restaurant from the City of Fort Lauderdale, on the site of the municipally owned Bahia Mar marina, spending $800,000 to renovate and landscape it. The menu was identical to that at her Westchester Candlelight, featuring standard American dishes at moderate prices. In the early 1960s, the city began accepting offers for the sale or lease of the public marina, hoping to develop it with a hotel, shopping center and other real estate investments.

Murphy was awarded a 50-year-lease in exchange for promises of a million dollars in improvements. The cost of the lease over the 50-year-period was $7,500,000. In 1962, Mayor Edmund Berry pressed keys to Bahia Mar into Murphy's white-gloved hand, calling them the "keys to a gold mine."

Construction was delayed for more than a year by litigation over several issues, including taxes. A court ruled that the city-owned marina no longer qualified for tax exemptions under the Murphy lease. Not contesting the decision, Murphy said she would proceed with construction. However, soon after that announcement, Murphy's Fort Lauderdale Candlelight Corporation sold all its shares to an investment group headed by Maryland developer Albert W. Turner, which took over the lease to the marina and built the Bahia Mar Hotel. The restaurant continued to operate as Patricia Murphy's Candlelight Restaurant, and Murphy remained associated with it for more than a decade, also leasing a gift shop from the new marina owners.

Murphy opened a second Florida restaurant in Deerfield Beach, Fla. around 1970. As in Fort Lauderdale, the Deerfield Beach Candlelight included gardens. An artificial brook flowed through the dining room, and the bar's tall plexiglass windows looked out onto a moat.

== Final restaurants ==
In 1957, Murphy acquired a stake in a London supper club, La Maison de France, co-owned and operated by Helene Cordet, a French-born star of British television. Cordet wrote that her club, which attracted celebrities including Frank Sinatra and Rita Hayworth, could not have opened without Murphy's backing.

In 1963, Murphy re-entered Manhattan, acquiring two former White Turkey Inn restaurants at 13 East 49th Street and 260 Madison Avenue. The 49th Street location, near Radio City Music Hall, became a destination for tour buses.

In 1970, Murphy opened her last New York restaurant at One Fifth Avenue in Greenwich Village.

== Personal life ==
Murphy married a stock broker, E. Schuyler Robinson, in 1938. According to Murphy's autobiography, the marriage was unhappy and ended quickly. In 1948 she married Captain James E. Kiernan, a retired naval architect. The couple purchased a waterfront home near Stuart, Fla. Occupying 28 acres and including a private island, the estate, called Kinsale, was described by a local newspaper as "palatial."

Murphy's second marriage ended with Kiernan's death from heart disease in 1957. Murphy had no children.

In her autobiography, Murphy mentioned only one sibling, her youngest sister Sheila. A brother, James, also became a restaurateur. In 1949, he had agreed to manage Patricia's Manhasset, N.Y., restaurant but changed his mind after a quarrel. Instead, in 1950 he joined with two other sisters, Lauraine and Maude, and brother Vincent, to open a restaurant a few miles from the Candlelight, in Great Neck, N.Y. Lauraine Murphy's, as it was known, opened a second location in Manhasset in 1954. By then the Manhasset Candlelight was under new ownership, though still named Patricia Murphy's.

In 1961, the year of the publication of her autobiography, Murphy maintained two residences. In New York, she lived in a penthouse overlooking the lake in Central Park while in Florida she continued to live in the Stuart estate acquired during her second marriage. She oversaw her restaurants in the two states by flying between them in her own Cessna 310 airplane, which, according to her autobiography, she piloted herself, although she also said she hired a pilot.

== Financial decline ==
In 1967 a classified advertisement in the Wall Street Journal offered Kinsale for sale, describing it as "Patricia Murphy's fabulous home," and adding, "price reduced for immediate sale." Murphy subsequently rented a waterfront home in the Harbor Beach section of Fort Lauderdale. Though smaller than Kinsale, it was featured in a design magazine.

In 1968 New York State began construction on a six-lane arterial highway near the largest of Murphy's restaurants, the Candlelight in Westchester County, and a contractor announced that 27 buildings would be torn down. The Candlelight and the owners of the land it occupied received notice in 1969 of the state's plans for appropriation. In 1971, the Westchester Candlelight closed. In 1972 the restaurant was razed to make way for the highway. The property is now a strip mall, whose larger tenants are CVS and Outback Steakhouse.

The Candlelight in Greenwich Village went out of business in 1974 and was successfully sued by its landlord, New York University, for improperly assigning its lease to another company and failing to repay money advanced for renovations. Two years later, the Candlelight on Madison Avenue filed for bankruptcy.

A typhoid outbreak that sickened about a dozen people from three states and attracted national media attention was traced to the Candlelight on 49th Street. In January 1976 the New York City health department closed the 49th Street restaurant, which was subsequently sold.

In Florida, Murphy apparently transferred her shares in the Deerfield Beach, Florida, restaurant to a longtime manager, John E. Rogers. In 1977, a newspaper restaurant review said she no longer had an interest in any Florida restaurants, and that Rogers was the owner of the Deerfield Beach establishment, which later changed its name to the Cascades restaurant and for a time was known as Trees and You.

== Death ==
Murphy died in Fort Lauderdale, Fla., on November 23, 1979, after a long illness. She is buried under her married name in Arlington National Cemetery near her second husband, Capt. Kiernan.
