= St. Peter's Colony =

British colony off the coast of Newfoundland, which existed between 1713 and 1815

- 1713–1815
- Flag

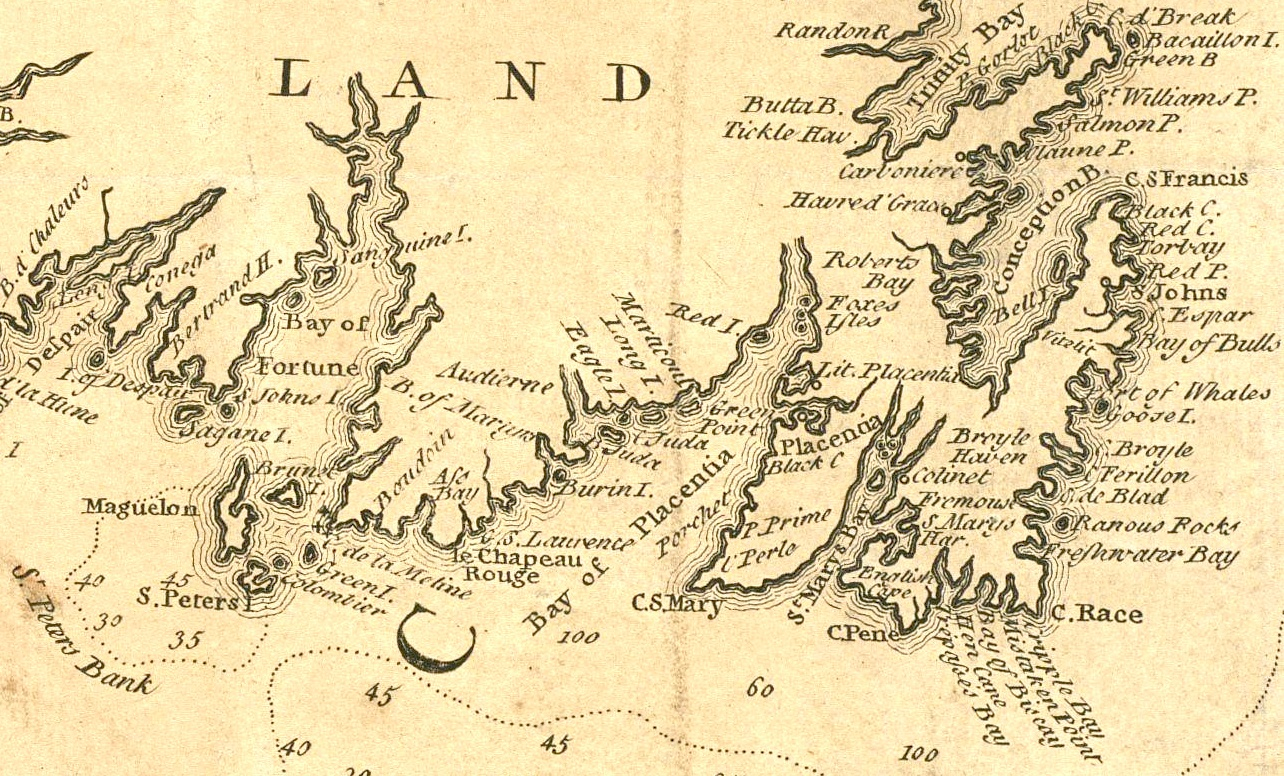
- Map of Newfoundland, including the St. Peter's Colony to the south (1746)
- Status: Colony of Great Britain (1713–1763); Colony of the United Kingdom (1778–1815)
- Official languages: English
- Minority languages: French
- Religion: Church of England
- Monarch
  - 1713–1714: Anne (first)
  - 1760–1820: George III (last)
- Governor
- History
  - Treaty of Utrecht: 1713
  - With the Treaty of Paris, the archipelago returned to France.: 1763
  - Because of France's participation in the American Revolutionary War, Newfoundland Colony attacked the islands and deported its inhabitants.: 1778
  - France regained the islands: 1783
  - During the War of the First Coalition, the British army, from Halifax, attacked the islands and took possession: 1793
  - Treaty of Amiens and second abdication of Napoleon: 1815

Area
  - Total: 25 km^{2} (9.7 sq mi)
- Currency: Newfoundland pound
Preceded by	Succeeded by
Terre-Neuve (New France)	Kingdom of France; Saint Pierre and Miquelon
- Today part of: France; Saint Pierre and Miquelon

The St. Peter's Colony was a British colony established in 1713 on the islands of Saint Pierre, Miquelon and Langlade, off the island of Newfoundland, which today forms the province of Newfoundland and Labrador.

In 1763, France officially recovered the archipelago under the 1763 Treaty of Paris, before losing it again with its entry into the American War of Independence.

France finally reclaimed the archipelago in 1815, a century after the Treaty of Utrecht.

== History ==
=== Fifty years of British control (1713–1763) ===
In 1713, under the Peace of Utrecht ending the War of the Spanish Succession, France lost all its possessions on the island of Newfoundland (in French: Colonie de Terre-Neuve), including the islands of Saint Pierre and Miquelon. However, it retained exclusive fishing rights on the French Shore of Newfoundland.

After taking control of the islands, the British changed the name of Saint-Pierre to "St. Peter's". The British government commissioned two surveys of its new possessions between 1714 and 1716. Newfoundland merchant and planter William Taverner surveys the area west of Placentia Bay for the British Board of Trade. The British Admiralty commissioned Lieutenant John Gaudy to map the area in 1716.

During the early years of British domination of the archipelago, ships from Brittany, and more specifically from Saint-Malo, continued to dock at St. Peter's. This illegal trade soon disappeared. British and Anglo-American merchants gradually made their appearance. They opened business premises and pushed the French merchants to leave.

By the 1760s, British merchants owned a number of houses, warehouses and fishing facilities in St. Peter's. The island of Miquelon was granted in its entirety in 1722 to a resident of the province of Massachusetts Bay, before being sold to men from the province of New Hampshire in the 1750s.

=== Return of French administration (1763–1778) ===
In 1763, following the Treaty of Paris which ended the Seven Years' War, France ceded all its North American possessions to Great Britain. It nevertheless retained fishing rights on the coast of Newfoundland, known as the French Shore, as well as a retrocession of Saint Pierre and Miquelon archipelago.

=== Half a century of wars and attacks (1778–1816) ===
After France entered the American Revolutionary War on the side of the United States, the archipelago was recaptured from Nova Scotia (the former colony of Acadia) by British forces in 1778. Over a five-year period, Great Britain destroyed all colonial settlements in Saint Pierre and Miquelon and deported nearly 2,000 settlers to France.

In 1783, France regained control of the islands.

In 1793, during the French Revolution, the United Kingdom once again landed on the island of Saint Pierre. It deported the French settlers and tried to establish a community of British colonists for three years, before being attacked by the French Navy in 1796.

The Treaty of Amiens allowed France to regain possession of the island in 1802, but only for a few months, until the British returned to the island after hostilities resumed in 1803. The British occupied the archipelago until Napoleon's first abdication in 1814. The Treaty of Paris returned Saint Pierre and Miquelon to France under the First Restoration, before it was again occupied by the British with Napoleon's return to France during the Hundred Days.

The British occupation of the Saint Pierre and Miquelon archipelago came to a definitive end in 1815. France found the islands uninhabited, with destroyed or dilapidated structures and buildings.

== See also ==
- Terre-Neuve (New France) (1655–1713)
- Dominion of Newfoundland (1907–1949)
- Newfoundland and Labrador (1949)
