= Briseis (disambiguation) =

Briseis was a princess in Greek mythology.

Briseis may also refer to:

- Briséïs, 1897 opera by Emmanuel Chabrier
- Briseis (British horse) (1804–1824), British racehorse
- Briseis (Australian horse) (1873–1879), Australian racehorse
- HMS Briseis, ships of the Royal Navy
- 655 Briseïs, minor planet orbiting the Sun
- Briseis Mine and Dam in Derby, Tasmania

== See also ==
- Cressida (disambiguation) and Chryseis, characters conflated with Briseis since the medieval period
