= Charmian (given name) =

- Gender: Female
- Language: English via Greek

Origin
- Meaning: Joy

Charmian is a feminine given name, an English spelling of the Late Greek name Kharmion, which is a diminutive form of the word kharma, meaning delight. The name was used for an attendant to Cleopatra in the 1607 tragedy Antony and Cleopatra by William Shakespeare. Shakespeare borrowed the name from a translation of Plutarch's Parallel Lives by Thomas North.

Notable people with the name include:

- Charmian Campbell (1942–2009), British socialite and portrait painter
- Charmian Carr (1942–2016), American actress, best known for her role as Liesl in The Sound of Music (1965)
- Charmian Clift (1923–1969), Australian writer
- Charmian Faulkner, Australian two-year-old who disappeared with her mother in 1980; see Disappearance of Louise and Charmian Faulkner
- Charmian Gadd, Australian violinist and 1962 winner of an ABC Young Performers Award
- Charmian Gooch, British social activist
- Charmian Gradwell, British actress
- Charmian Innes, British actress in movies such as Up for the Cup
- Charmian Hussey, British writer
- Charmian Johnson, Canadian curator and artist
- Charmian Kittredge (1871–1955), American writer and second wife of Jack London
- Charmion King (1925–2007), Canadian actress
- Charmian May (1937–2002), British actress
- Charmian Mellars, New Zealand basketballer
- Charmian O'Connor, New Zealand organic chemist
- Charmion Von Wiegand (1896–1983), American artist and journalist
- Charmian Woodfield (1929–2014), British archaeologist
