= Fort Frederick (Newfoundland) =

Coordinates: 47.2493°N 53.9617°W

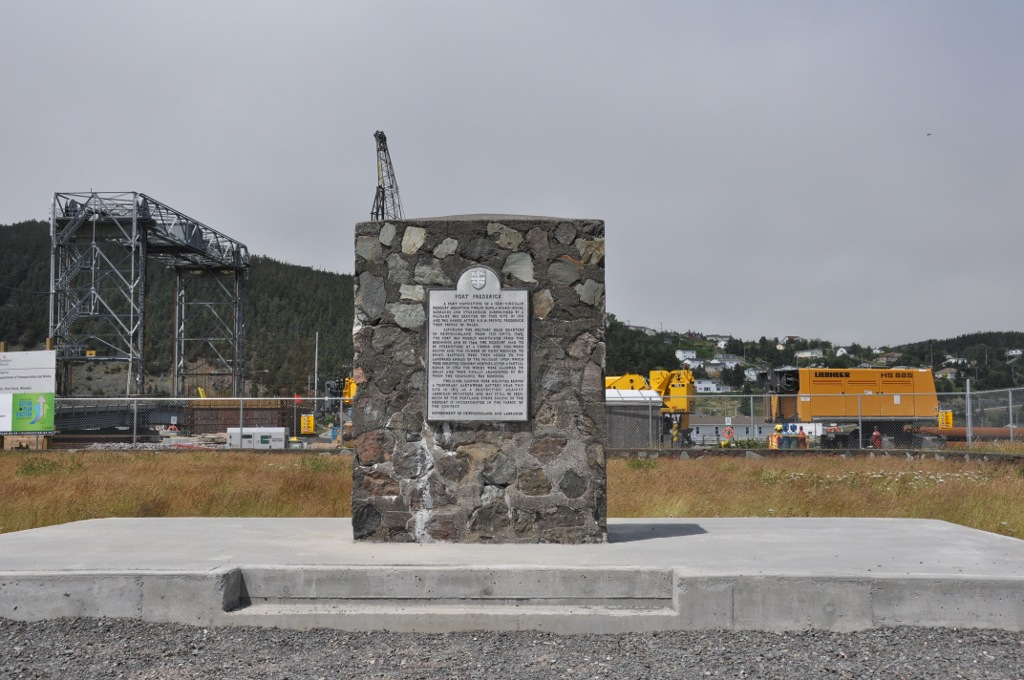
Fort Frederick historical marker

Fort Frederick was a British redoubt that was built to help fortify their acquisition of Placentia in Newfoundland Colony. Under the command of Samuel Gledhill, it served as the military headquarters for Newfoundland from 1721 to 1746. There was a report that the Mi'kmaq were involved in a raid of Placentia during Father Rale's War, in which they were said to have killed 200 English. Governor Drummer did not believe the report.

By the 1740s, the British began construction of New Fort, which overlay the former Fort Louis. During King George's War, the Mi’kmaq militia from Ile Royal raided various British outposts in Newfoundland in August 1745. They attacked several British houses, taking 23 prisoners. The following spring the Mi’kmaq began to take 12 of the prisoners to a rendez-vous point close to St. John’s, en route to Quebec. The British prisoners managed to kill their Mi’kmaq captors at the rendez-vous site near St. John. Two days later, another group of Mi’kmaq took the remaining 11 British prisoners to the same rendez-vous point. Discovering the fate of the Mi’kmaq captors, the other Mi’kmaq killed the remaining 11 British prisoners.

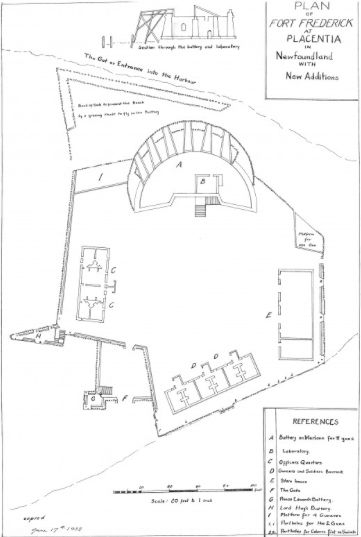
Fort Frederick Newfoundland Blueprint

During the French and Indian War, Governor Thomas Graves was forced to temporarily move to Placentia following the French victory in the Battle of Signal Hill at St. John's. Fort Frederick was partially repaired.

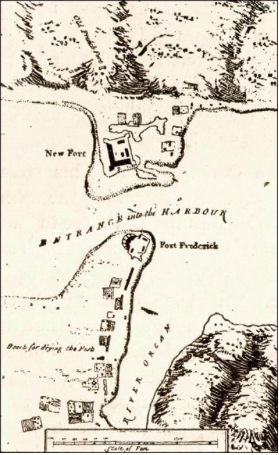
Fort Frederick Newfoundland Map

== See also ==
- Castle Hill, Newfoundland and Labrador
