= Sir Ambrose Shea Lift Bridge =

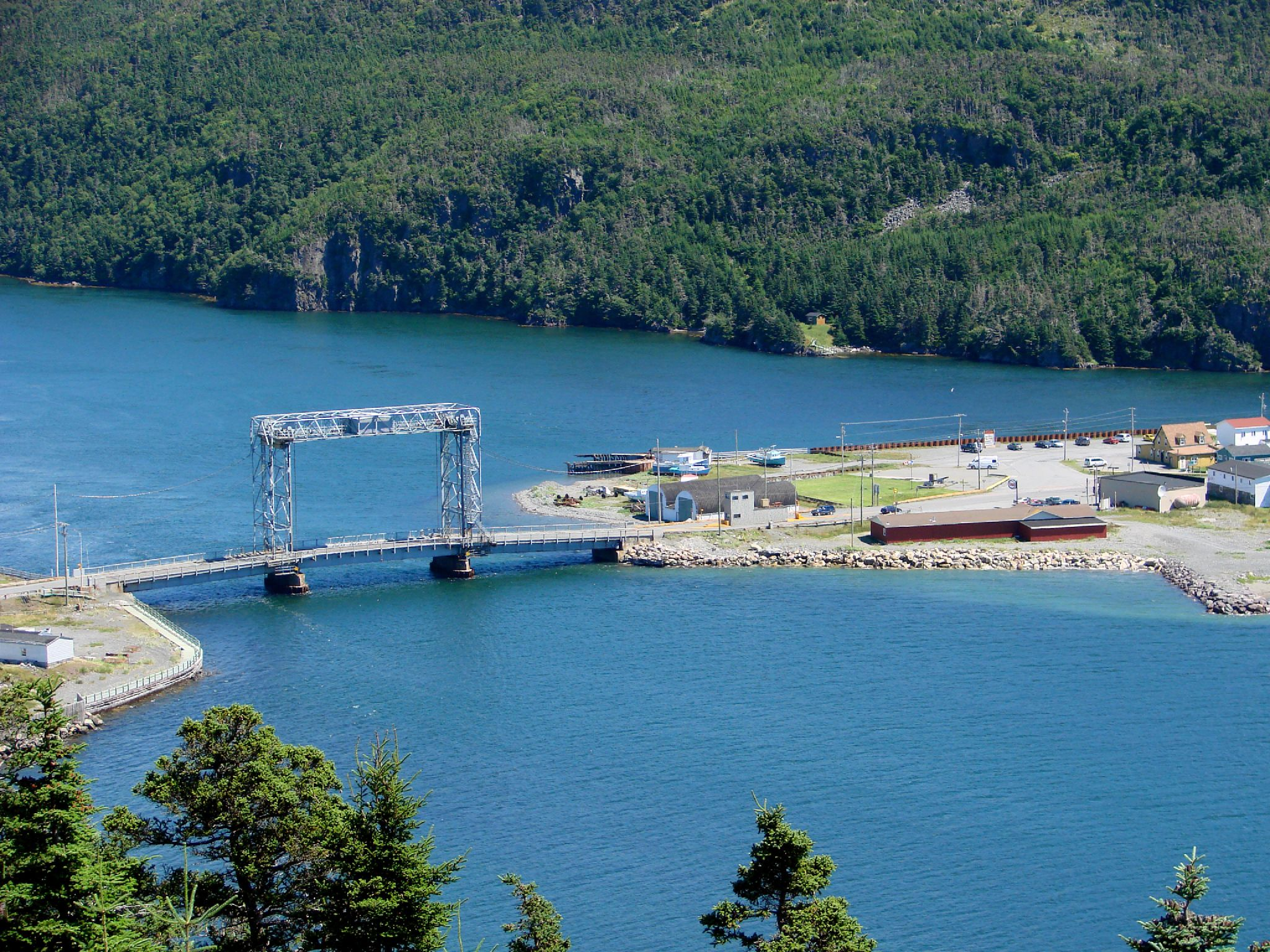
- Coordinates: 47.250502°N 53.962544°W
- Carries: Motor Vehicles, Pedestrians
- Crosses: The gut
- Locale: Placentia, Newfoundland and Labrador, Canada

History
- Construction cost: $46,000,000

Location
- Interactive map of Sir Ambrose Shea Lift Bridge

The Sir Ambrose Shea Lift Bridge is a lift bridge located in Placentia, Newfoundland and Labrador, Canada. It is named after Ambrose Shea, a political and business figure in colonial Newfoundland who later served as Governor of the Bahamas. The first Sir Ambrose Shea lift bridge opened in 1961, allowing people and vehicles to be transported across 'the gut' (the narrow opening to the harbour). It was the only lift bridge in the province. The bridge easily lifts up and lowers down to allow both pedestrians to cross over and boats to pass through the body of water.

== History ==
It has always been a challenge to cross the large body of water separating Placentia and Jerseyside. The tide changes every eight and a half hours while the spring tide rise is 2.1m and neap tide rise is 1.5m. There were a number of smaller ferry services offering passage over the tidal waterway, but the biggest change came when the Americans came and created the Argentia Naval Base in 1941, occupying the nearby town of Argentia. They brought the supplies and materials to create a pontoon bridge by September of 1941, but the heavy currents washed the bridge away by December of that year. In 1954, the first ferry to move cars and other vehicles across the Gut was the M.V. Ambrose Shea. The solution of a lift bridge came into fruition in 1961 to much excitement. It attracted people including premier Joey Smallwood, magistrate William Linegar, and G.A. Frecker who was the Minister of Education. Joey Smallwood was the first person to drive across the new bridge.

== Second lift bridge ==
In 2012, a new lift bridge was required as the currently standing bridge was in poor condition. Construction started in 2013 and continued until the bridge's opening in 2016, with a project cost of $46,000,000. Premier Dwight Ball was the first person to drive across this new bridge in a 1957 Ford Fairlane, hearkening to past years.

== Construction ==
It is composed of three spans, with a centre movable span (vertical lift span) flanked by two simple fixed composite plate girder spans. The towers consist of a three-dimensional steel truss shaped representative of sails. Each tower component is connected by a three-dimensional exoskeleton truss housing the machinery operating the lift span.

== See also ==
- List of vertical-lift bridges
- Vertical-lift bridge
- Moveable bridge
