= Araminta =

- Gender: Feminine
- Language: English

Origin
- Origin: African name Aminata

Other names
- Nicknames: Minta, Minty, Minnie, Ara
- Related names: Aminta/Amynta, Aramantha, Arminta

Araminta is a feminine given name linked to the plant Amaranth.

== People with the given name ==
- Araminta Ross (1822–1913), African-American abolitionist who adopted the name Harriet Tubman
- Araminta Estelle Durfee, the birth name of American screen actress Minta Durfee (1889–1975)
- Lady Araminta Spencer-Churchill (born 2007), British equestrian
- Araminta Holman (1870–1935), American home economist

== Use in fiction ==
- Araminta Lee, character in Kevin Kwan's novel Crazy Rich Asians (2013) and film based on the novel
- Araminta, character in William Congreve's comedy The Old Bachelor (1693)
- Araminta, character in Sir John Vanbrugh's play The Confederacy (1705)
- Matilda Angelina Araminta Phelps, the name given to Tom Sawyer's baby cousin in Mark Twain's Adventures of Huckleberry Finn (1884)
- Araminta, mother of Velvet Brown, the title heroine of Enid Bagnold's novel National Velvet (1935)
- Araminta Spook, title character and protagonist of Angie Sage's Araminta Spook/ie series of children's books, first released in 2008
- Araminta, one of the main characters in the Void Trilogy from Peter F. Hamilton
- Araminta Jane Delahunty is a character in The Fractured Europe Sequence by Dave Hutchinson
- Araminta Gunningworth, previously Reilling (née Wincheslea), Countess of Penwood, the main antagonist of the Regency romance novel An Offer from a Gentleman, the third entry in the Bridgerton series by Julia Quinn. She is portrayed by Katie Leung as Araminta Gun in the fourth season of the Netflix adaptation of the series.
- Araminta Cowper, Lady Cowper, mother of Cressida Cowper, in the first three seasons of Netflix adaptation of the Bridgerton series. She is portrayed by Joanna Bobin.
- Araminta "Minta" Herrick (née Cardew), one of the main characters in Victoria Holt's The Shadow of the Lynx
- Araminta Station, a science fiction novel by Jack Vance; first book of the Cadwal Chronicles
- Araminta 'Minty' Cane, character from the TV series Moondial and the Helen Cresswell book it was based on
- Harriet Araminta Lee, main character from Helen Oyeyemi's novel, Gingerbread
- A similar name was used by poet Richard Lovelace for the title heroine of "Aramantha: A Pastorall" (1649)
- John Dryden used a variant of the masculine Greek name Amyntas for a female character in "Go tell Amynta, gentle swain" (1680s)
