= Louis de Pastour de Costebelle =

French colonial administrator

Louis de Pastour de Costebelle (1658 – 2 March 1732) was a French naval officer who served as interim governor of Plaisance (Placentia), Newfoundland, before the arrival of Jacques-François de Monbeton de Brouillan in 1690. Costebelle came to Newfoundland as head of a detachment of soldiers in 1687.

His brother Philippe Pastour de Costebelle was the governor of Plaisance from 1706 to 1713.

== See also ==
- Governors of Newfoundland
- List of people of Newfoundland and Labrador

Political offices
Preceded by Antoine Parat	Governor of Plaisance; 1690–1691	Succeeded by Jacques-François de Monbeton de Brouillan
