= Battle of Placentia (217 BC) =

217 BC battle of the Second Punic War

- Part of the Second Punic War
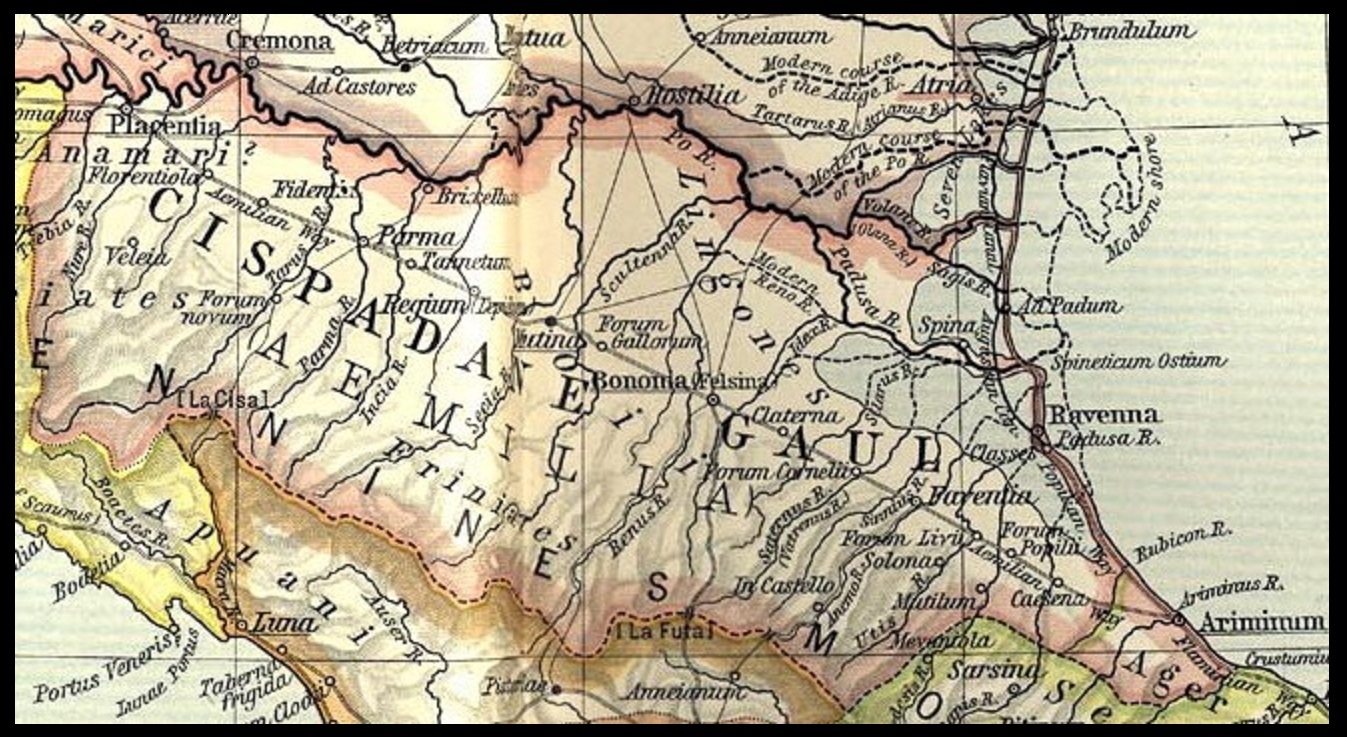
- Territories of Cisalpine Gaul, where the clashes took place near Placentia (top left)
Date	January 217 BC
Location	Piacenza, Italy
Result	Inconclusive

Belligerents
Roman Republic	Carthage

Commanders and leaders
Tiberius	Hannibal

Strength
Unknown, a few thousand	12,000 infantry 5,000 cavalry

Casualties and losses
600 infantry 300 cavalry	600 infantry 300 cavalry

The Battle of Placentia which took place in January of 217 BC during the Second Punic War, represented a double clash of secondary importance, engaged between the army of the consul Tiberius Sempronius Longus and the Carthaginian army of Hannibal, after the latter's victories at the Ticinus and at the Trebbia (end of 218 BC).

== Background ==
The Battle of Ticinus and the Battle of Trebbia had just ended with a clear victory for the Carthaginian cavalry and the wounding of the consul Tiberus in the first, as well as a clear defeat of the army of Tiberius Sempronio Longo in the second, where the Roman army was largely destroyed on the field.

The fortress-pantry of Clastidium, where the Romans kept large reserves of food, especially wheat, had also fallen into the hands of Hannibal. Titus Livy, the historian of the 1st century attributes to the prefect of the garrison, the brindisino Dasio, the transfer of the town for the sum, not even exceptional, of four hundred golden nummies.

Of the remnants of the Roman army after the battle of Trebbia, a part was exterminated near the river itself by Hannibal's knights and elephants, while he lingered to recross the course of the freezing river. The cavalry and part of the Roman infantry had managed to return to the camp and, having seen that the Carthaginian forces were unable to cross the river due to tiredness, stiffened by the cold, as well as by the disorder, to return to Piacenza led by Publius Cornelius. Finally, part of the Romans moved to the nearby Roman colony of Cremona, so as not to burden the resources of a single colony with the whole army.

The Battle of Trebbia had ended with a clear success for Hannibal. The Carthaginian forces were now positioned in the western Po Valley. There were few casualties among the Iberians and Libyans, many more among the Celts. Livy adds that the rain mixed with snow and the frost caused many victims among the Carthaginians, with almost all the elephants paying the price. The truth is that

This defeat generated such fear in Rome that it was believed that Hannibal would arrive in the city with his banners displayed hostilely. And there would have been no hope of help that the Romans could count on to keep the violence of the Carthaginian away from the gates and walls.

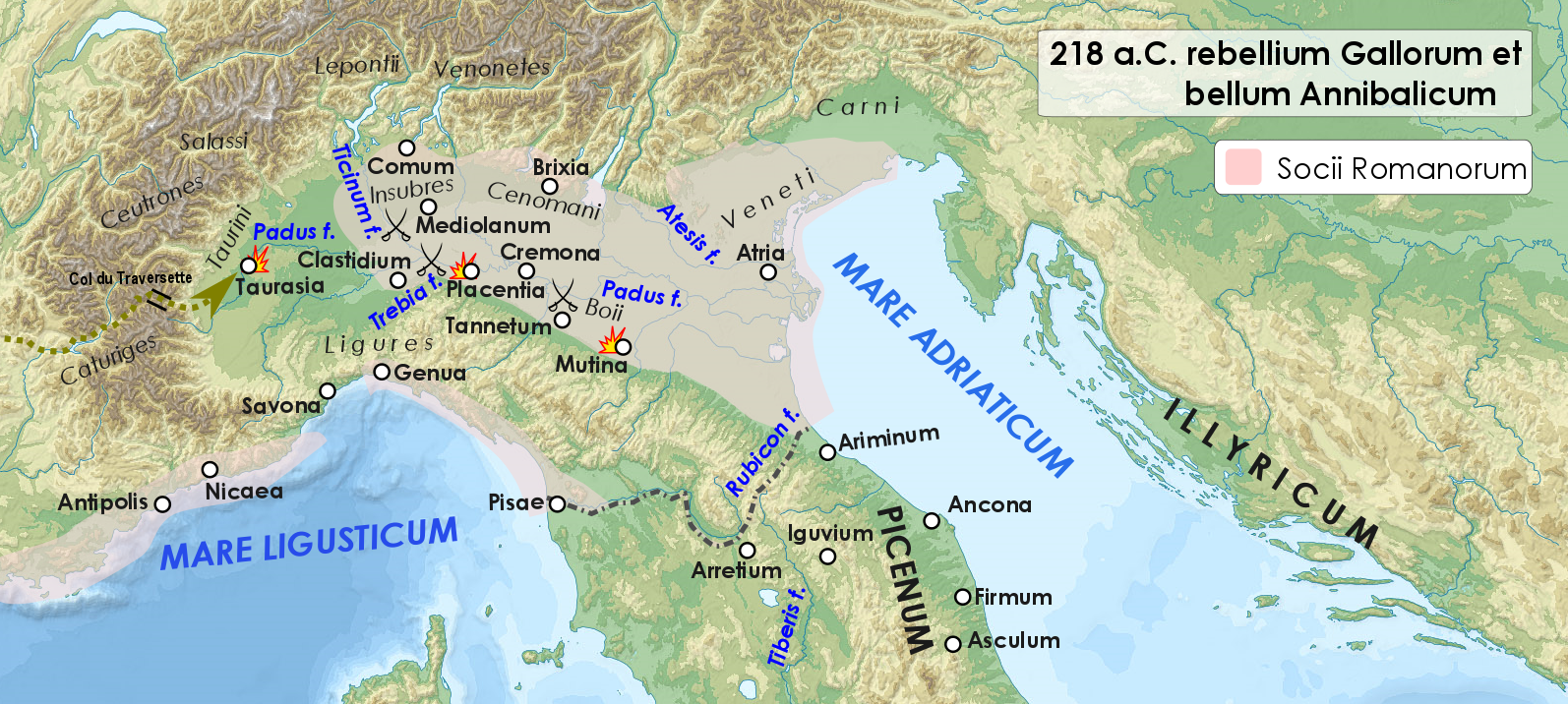
The Cisalpine Gaul, theater of operations in the autumn of 218 BC: from the revolt of the Boii with the Siege of Mutina, to Hannibal's victories at the Ticinus and at the Trebbia

== First battle ==
Not even their stay in the winter quarters was peaceful for the Romans, as the Numidian cavalry continued to carry out raids everywhere, and when the places were unsuitable for these raids, the troops of the Celtiberians also intervened and the Lusitanians. In fact, it was difficult to obtain supplies for the Roman troops except through transport along the river Po.

Near Piacenza (Placentia) there was a fortified Roman depot. Hannibal headed against it to conquer it, with knights and infantry equipped with light weapons. And although he attempted the feat with a night assault, he failed to deceive the sentries. The battle that broke out was felt as far as Placentia, so much so that the consul prepared the cavalry, commanding the legions to follow him in square order (quadrato agmine).

The subsequent battle was of an equestrian nature and saw Hannibal leave the battle wounded in combat, "a circumstance which generated dismay in the minds of the Carthaginians". Following this clash, the deposit was further fortified and defended.

And when Hannibal recovered from his wound, after a few days, he continued his journey towards the location of Victumulae to conquer it. A Roman deposit had been located here since the time of the Gallic war of the years 225-222 BC. The clash that followed saw as many as 30,000 men inexperienced in military art, allies of the Romans, defeated by a few armed Carthaginians, but well trained. The city fell into Carthaginian hands shortly afterwards and was sacked barbarically.

== Second battle ==
Hannibal, after encamping around 10 miles south of Piacenza, rested. The following day he led part of his army against the Romans who were camped with the consul Tiberius Sempronius Longus near the city, triggering a new battle. They consisted of 12,000 infantry and 5,000 cavalry.

The consul Sempronius did not shy away from the fight. The two armies thus found themselves deployed at a distance of 3,000 (4.5 km) steps from each other. At the first clash the Romans not only did they defeat the enemy who retreated, but they pursued him to the camps, which they attacked. Hannibal then, leaving few defenders in the trenches and at the gates, he gathered the others at the central point, ready at his command to make a sortie outside the camp.

When three in the afternoon arrived (nona hora diei), the Romans, now tired from the assault, gave the signal to retreat, seeing that there was little hope of taking over the enemy camp. Hannibal then quickly had the cavalry exit from the two side gates, while he himself led the heavy infantry from the central gate.

Rarely would a battle have been more violent or notorious for the disaster that both sides might have suffered, had the day been long enough to fight. The night put an end to the fight which had broken out with great fury.

The outcome of the battle was a perfect draw. The fallen on both sides were no more than 600 infantry and 300 cavalry. However, some personalities also perished among the Romans of the equestrian order, including five military tribunes and three praefecti sociorum.

== Consequences ==
According to what Livy narrates, after the second battle, Hannibal retreated to the Ligurian country, while Sempronius to Lucca (probably through the Val di Taro and the Cisa pass). Two Roman quaestors, Gaius Fulvius Flaccus and Lucius Lucretius, were delivered to the Carthaginian by this population, together with two tribunes and five sons of senators, almost all of them of the equestrian order. All this to demonstrate their good faith and desire to obtain Hannibal's alliance.

== Sources ==
- Giovanni Brizzi (1997). Storia di Roma. 1. Dalle origini ad Azio. Bologna: Patron. ISBN 978-88-555-2419-3.
- Giovanni Brizzi (2007). Scipione e Annibale, la guerra per salvare Roma. Bari-Roma: Laterza. ISBN 978-88-420-8332-0.
- Giovanni Brizzi (2016). Canne. La sconfitta che fece vincere Roma. Bologna: Il Mulino. ISBN 978-88-15-26416-9.
- Theodor Mommsen (2001). Storia di Roma antica. Milano: Sansoni. ISBN 978-88-383-1882-5.
- Howard H.Scullard (1992). Storia del mondo romano. Dalla fondazione di Roma alla distruzione di Cartagine. Milano: BUR. ISBN 978-88-17-11903-0.
