= Araminta Holman =

American home economist

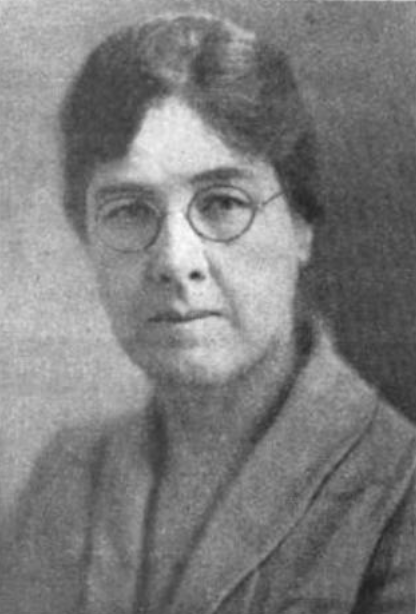
- Holman, from a 1925 publication
- Born: May 16, 1870; Leavenworth County, Kansas, U.S.
- Died: July 6, 1935 (aged 65); Manhattan, Kansas, U.S.
- Other name: Araminta Paddleford
- Occupations: Home economist, college professor
- Relatives: Clementine Paddleford (stepdaughter)

Araminta Kinnear Holman Paddleford (May 16, 1870 – July 6, 1935) was an American home economist and college professor. She was head of the department of applied art in the home economics program at Kansas State Agricultural College, where she taught from 1913 to 1930, and was elected president of the Kansas State Artists' Association in 1926.

== Early life and education ==
Holman was born in Leavenworth County, Kansas, the daughter of Edwin Johnston Holman and Alice Magdalen Kinnear Holman. She graduated from the New York School of Fine Arts and from Teachers College, Columbia University in 1923. She took a leave of absence for further studies in Paris in 1925.

== Career ==
Holman was a professor of applied art in the home economics department at Kansas State Agricultural College, beginning in 1913. During her tenure as head of the Applied Arts department, she opened the Art Gallery at Kansas State. She gave interior decorating, housekeeping, and entertaining advice in newspaper articles, lectures, and radio broadcasts. She was elected president of the Kansas State Artists' Association in 1926. She resigned her faculty employment when she married in 1930.

== Publications ==
- Art Applied in Home Furnishing and Decorating (1923, booklet)
- "Art in Home Furnishing and Decorating" (1923)
- "Why Bother About Housecleaning?" (1927)

== Personal life ==
Holman married widower Solon Marion Paddleford in 1930. His daughter Clementine Paddleford was a noted food writer. Holman died in 1935, at the age of 65, in Manhattan, Kansas.
