= Charmian Hussey =

Charmian Hussey (born 1939) is an author of children's literature. Her book The Valley of Secrets is a best seller in many countries.

== Biography ==
According to her website, Hussey was born in London in 1939. She pursued a career as a model, then decided to obtain her college education. She studied archeology at the University of London, then at Oxford she completed a doctorate in Turkish pottery. She currently lives in the Cornish countryside with husband John.

== Published works ==
- The Valley of Secrets (2003)
- Howl on the Wind (Summer 2011)
