= HMS Briseis =

Two ships of the Royal Navy have borne the name HMS Briseis, after the princess Briseis in Greek mythology:

- HMS Briseis (1808) was a 10-gun Cherokee-class brig-sloop launched in 1808, wrecked off Cuba in 1816.
- HMS Briseis (1829) was a 6-gun Cherokee-class brig-sloop launched in 1829, fitted as a packet, that sank in the Atlantic in 1838.
