= Clementine Paddleford =

American food writer (1898–1967)

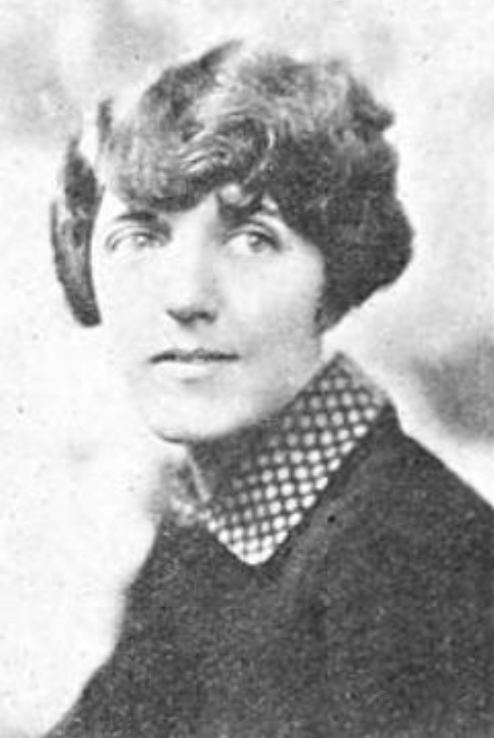
- Paddleford, from a 1929 publication
- Born: September 27, 1898; Riley County, Kansas, U.S.
- Died: November 13, 1967 (aged 69); New York, New York, U.S.
- Occupations: Journalist, food writer
- Notable work: How America Eats (1960)
- Relatives: Araminta Holman (stepmother)

Clementine Paddleford (September 27, 1898 – November 13, 1967) was an American food writer active from the 1920s through the 1960s, writing for several publications, including the New York Herald Tribune, the New York Sun, The New York Telegram, Farm and Fireside, and This Week magazine. A Kansas native, she lived most of her life in New York City, where she introduced her readers to the global range of food to be found in that city. Her 1960 book How America Eats was an influential discussion of American cooking and eating habits.

== Early life and education ==
Clementine Paddleford was born on a 260-acre (110 ha) farm near Stockdale, Riley County, Kansas, the daughter of Solon Marion Paddleford and Jennie Stroup Romig Paddleford. She graduated from Manhattan (Kansas) High School in 1916. She graduated from Kansas State Agricultural College in 1921 with a degree in industrial journalism.

While at Kansas State University, Paddleford met and married engineering student Lloyd D. Zimmerman, separating within a year. In 1932 she underwent surgery for a malignant growth on her larynx that left her with a tracheotomy tube in her throat, which she covered to speak, concealing it with a black ribbon. The operation left her with a distinctively husky voice. She moved to New York City, where she enrolled in the Columbia School of Journalism and attended night classes at New York University. She covered expenses by reviewing business books for the business publication Administration and the New York Sun.

== Writing career ==
After a series of writing jobs, including a stint as women's page editor at Farm & Fireside, Paddleford joined the New York Herald Tribune in 1936. She also wrote for Gourmet. Paddleford was a pilot, and flew a Piper Cub around the country to report on America's many regional cuisines. In the 1930s, Paddleford is said to have coined the term "hero" referring to a submarine sandwich because one needed to be a hero to finish the gigantic Italian sandwich, but there is no evidence of the word in her writing.

One of her assignments was to report on the cooking and food aboard a US Navy submarine, which brought her aboard the USS Skipjack (SSN-585) in 1960 for a brief cruise.

== Death and legacy ==
Paddleford died of pneumonia on November 13, 1967, in New York City. She is buried in the Grandview-Mill Creek-Stockdale Cemetery near Riley, Kansas.

In the years following her death, appraisals of Paddleford's work were mixed. Craig Claiborne was critical of Paddleford's expertise, stating in an interview that "Clem knew not one thing about food." Karen and John L. Hess agreed that she lacked a strong understanding, but praised her skills in reporting on the subject and her integrity in crediting sources.

== Works ==
- Patchwork Quilts, (c. 1928)
- A Dickens Christmas Dinner, (1933)
- Twelve favorite dishes, with Duncan Hines and Gertrude Lynn (1947)
- Recipes from Antoine’s kitchen : the secret riches of the famous century-old restaurant in the French Quarter of New Orleans, (United Newspapers Magazine Corp, 1948)
- A Flower for My Mother, (Henry Holt & Co, 1959)
- How America Eats, (Charles Scribner's Sons, 1960)
- New York Herald Tribune Presents New York, New York, (Dell, 1964)(essay contributor)
- Clementine Paddleford's Cook Young Cookbook, (Pocket Books, 1966)

Posthumously collected in:

- The Best In American Cooking: recipes collected by Clementine Paddleford, (Charles Scribner's Sons, 1970)
- American Food Writing: An Anthology with Classic Recipes, ed. Molly O'Neill (Library of America, 2007) ISBN 1-59853-005-4
