= Cressida (disambiguation) =

Cressida (/ˈkrɛsɪdə/ KRES-i-də, Greek: Χρησίδα) is a character in Medieval and Renaissance literature.

Cressida may also refer to:

- Cressida (moon), a moon of Uranus
- Cressida (band), an English progressive rock band
- Cressida (butterfly), a monotypic genus of butterfly in the family Papilionidae
- Toyota Cressida, a model of car
- V 102 Cressida, a German Vorpostenboot of World War II

As a given name:

- Cressida Bell (born 1959), English artist and designer
- Cressida Bonas (born 1989), English actress and model
- Cressida Campbell (born 1960), Australian artist
- Cressida Cauty, British vocalist
- Cressida Connolly (born 1960), English writer
- Cressida Cowell (born 1966), English children's author
- Cressida Dick (born 1960), Commissioner of London Metropolitan police
- Cressida Galea, Maltese politician
- Cressida Granger, British entrepreneur
- Cressida Heyes (born 1970), Canadian philosopher
- Cressida O'Hanlon, Australian politician

As a surname:

- Kat Cressida, American actress

== Fiction ==
- Cressida, a minor character in The Hunger Games, a series of novels and films

== See also ==
- 548 Kressida, an asteroid
- Troilus and Cressida, a play by William Shakespeare
- Briseis (disambiguation) and Chryseis, Greek female literary characters, origin of the name Cressida
