= Cosima =

- Gender: female

Origin
- Origin: Greek
- Meaning: "order"

Other names
- Related names: Cosmo, Cosimo

Cosima is a feminine given name, the feminine version of the name Cosimo. It is derived from the Greek Κοσμᾶς (Kosmâs), meaning 'order', 'decency'. Cosmo was a fourth-century saint who was martyred with his brother Damian. They are the patron saints of medical doctors. An Italian male version of the name is Cosimo.

== Masculine variants ==
- Côme (French)
- Cosimo (Italian)
- Cosma (Italian)
- Cosme (French), (Portuguese), (Spanish)
- Cosmin (Romanian)
- Cosmo (English), (German), (Italian)
- Kuzma (Russian)
- Kosma (Polish)

== Feminine variants ==
- Cosmina (Romanian)
- Cosma
- Cosme
- Kosma

== People ==
- Cosima von Bonin (born 1962), German artist
- Cosima von Bülow Pavoncelli (born 1967), British socialite and philanthropist
- Cosima De Vito (born 1976), Australian singer-songwriter
- Cosima Serrano, co-murderer of her niece Sarah Scazzi in 2010
- Cosima Wagner (1837–1930), wife of Richard Wagner and daughter of Franz Liszt, diarist and director of the Bayreuth Festival
- Cosima Stewart (born 1993), Irish writer on rugs and carpets

== Fictional characters ==
- Cosima Niehaus, one of the clones played by Tatiana Maslany in the television series Orphan Black
