= Fort Saint Louis (Newfoundland) =

Coordinates: 47.251348°N 53.964388°W

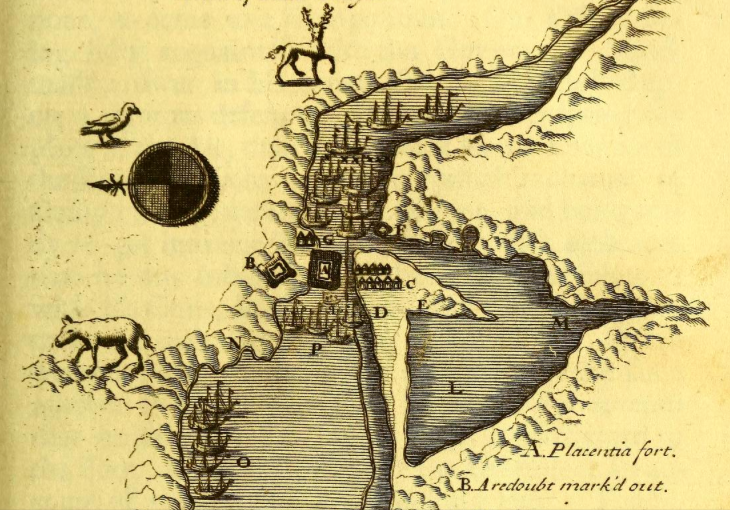
Fort Saint Louis (centre) - Battle of Placentia (1692)

Fort Saint Louis was a French fort built in the 17th century on Newfoundland at the time of the New France.

The construction began in 1690 for a new French fort on Newfoundland.

In 1662, the French had established a strategic trading post in a well protected cove overlooking Placentia Bay that separates Avalon to the rest of Newfoundland and near the Grand Banks.

To protect this place, several forts were built around the cove, Fort Plaisance from 1662, the Fort Royal in 1687 and Saint Louis 1690.

Fort Saint Louis was built inside the harbor in order to protect the small port city of Plaisance from an enemy attack. It was to reinforce the old fort built of wood in Placentia. Fort Saint Louis was built in stone. Its enclosure was nearly 250 meters long, encircling two bastions, the headquarters of the governor and the buildings of the garrison. The walls stood four meters high and the walls measured two meters thick. Almost thirty guns were operational on this fort.

The fort was attacked during King William's War in the Battle of Placentia (1692).

In 1713, the Treaty of Utrecht forced the French to abandon their settlements in Newfoundland. 'Plaisance' became 'Placentia'. The inhabitants were moved to Île Royale which began the construction of Louisbourg.

== See also ==
- List of French forts in North America
- Castle Hill, Newfoundland and Labrador
