= Fort Royal (Newfoundland) =

Coordinates: 47.2511°N 53.9715°W

- overlooking Placentia Bay, Newfoundland
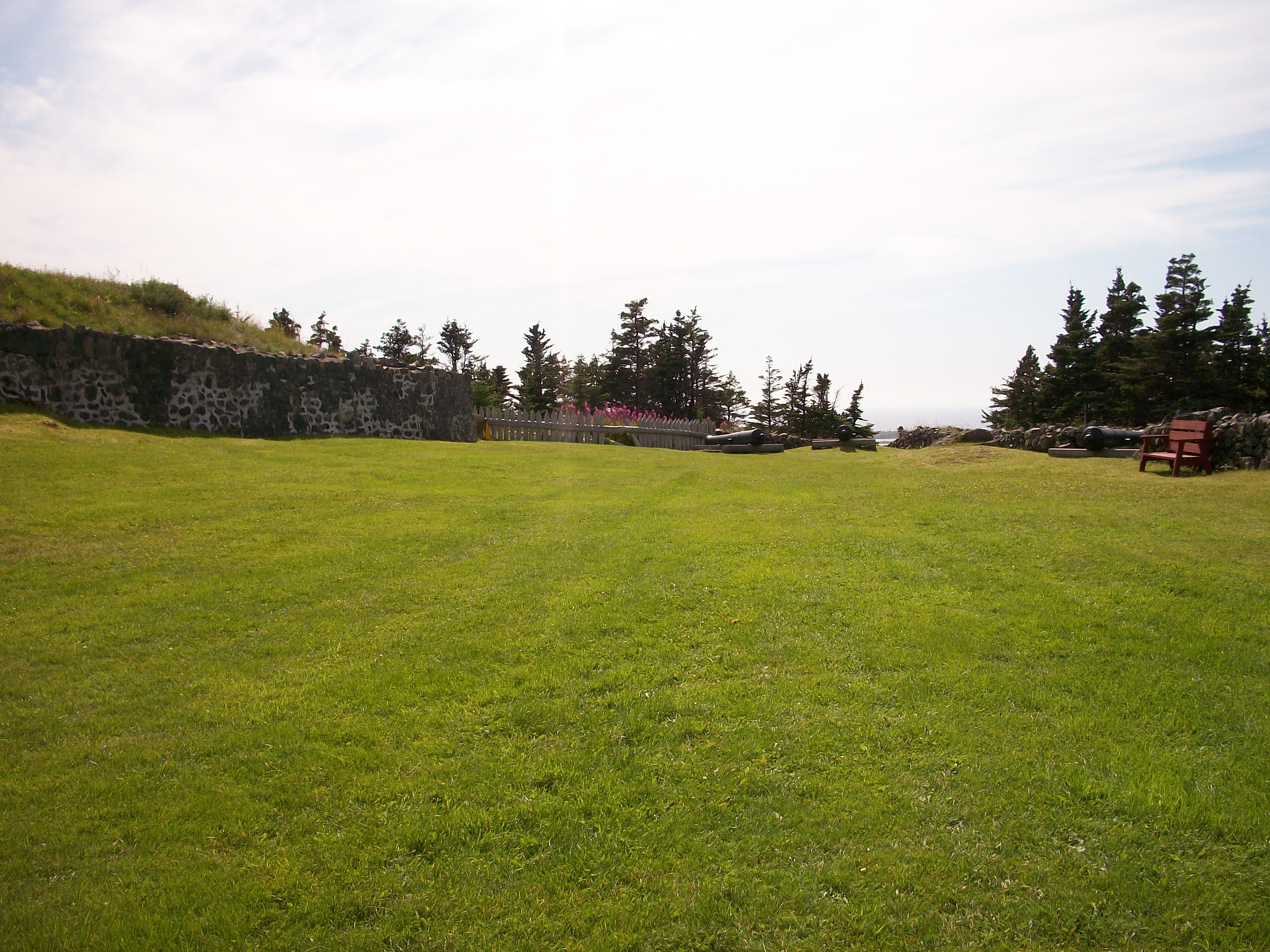
- Ruins of the fort

Site information
- Type: French fort

Site history
- Built: 1687

Fort Royal is a French fort built in 1687 on the island of Newfoundland during the time of New France.

In 1662, the French established a commercial counter on a well protected hill overlooking Placentia Bay which separates the Avalon Peninsula from the rest of Newfoundland island and situated near Grand Banks where fish are abundant.

In order to protect the bay, several forts were erected around the hill, Fort Plaisance (1662), Fort Royal (1687) and Fort Saint Louis (1690).

Fort Royal was constructed on the top of the hill which dominated the bay and the port village of Plaisance.

Fort Royal served as bastion and home for the governor.

In 1713, the Treaty of Utrecht forced the French to abandon their establishments in Newfoundland. Fort Royal and Fort Saint Louis were renamed "Castle Hill" by the English, and "Plaisance" became "Placentia". The French inhabitants were displaced to Isle Royale (Cape Breton), where they began the construction of Louisbourg.

== See also ==
- Castle Hill, Newfoundland and Labrador
