= Fort Plaisance =

Coordinates: 47.252851°N 53.968001°W

- overlooking Placentia Bay, Newfoundland
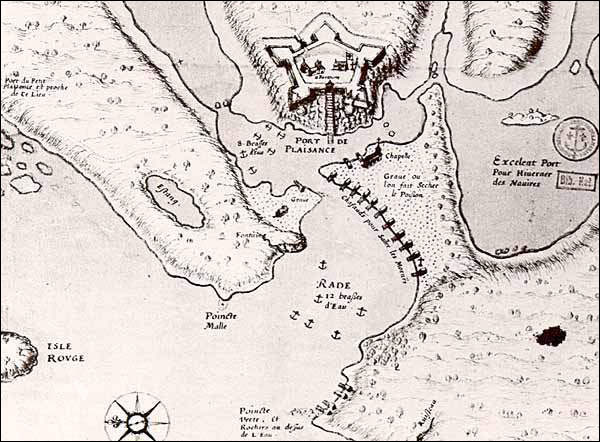
- Fort Plaisance in 1675

Site information
- Type: French fort

Site history
- Built: 1662

Fort Plaisance was a French fort built in the 17th century on the island of Newfoundland at the time of the New France.

In 1662, the French established a strategic trading post in a well protected cove overlooking Placentia Bay that separates Avalon from the rest of the island of Newfoundland, located close to Grand Banks.

To protect this place, several forts were built around the cove, Fort Plaisance in 1662, Fort Royal in 1687, and Fort Saint Louis in 1690.

Fort Plaisance was built inside the harbor in order to protect the small port city of Plaisance from an attack enemy.

During its construction, the Fort Plaisance had earthen ramparts reinforced by wooden stakes. In the beginning it had four guns. Its armament was gradually increased and in 1667, the fort had 32 guns.

In 1713, the Treaty of Utrecht forced the French to abandon their settlements in Newfoundland. 'Plaisance' become 'Placentia'. The French inhabitants were moved to Île Royale which began the construction of Louisbourg.

== See also ==
- List of French forts in North America
- Castle Hill, Newfoundland and Labrador
