= Placentia, Newfoundland and Labrador =

Placentia Pleasure Plaisance
- Town
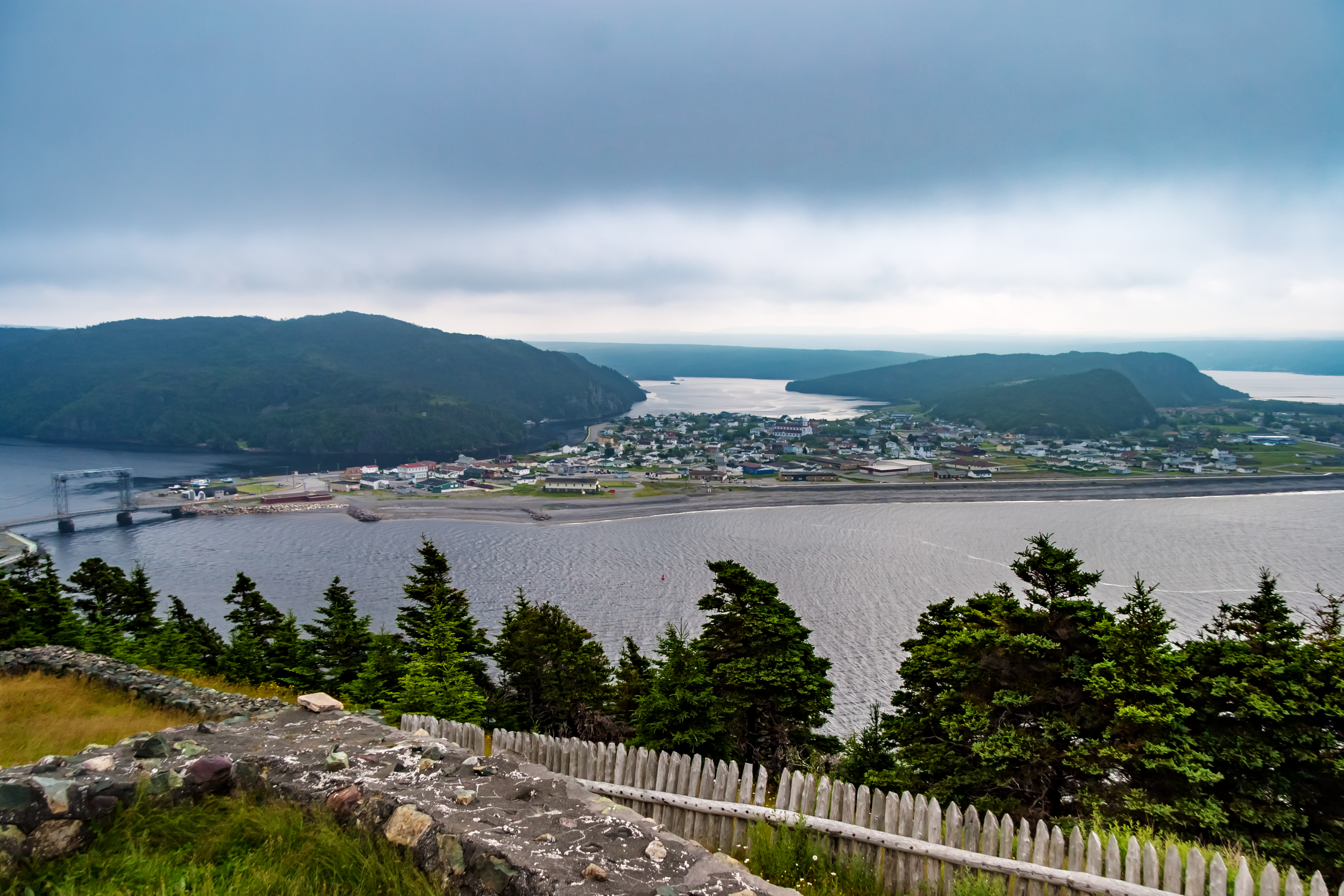
- Placentia

- Seal

- Location of Placentia Placentia (Canada)
- Coordinates: 47°14′45″N 53°57′40″W
- Country: Canada
- Province: Newfoundland and Labrador
- Settled: early 15th century

Government
  - Mayor: Keith Pearson

Population (2021)
  - Total: 3,289
- Time zone: UTC-3:30 (NST)
  - Summer (DST): UTC-2:30 (NDT)
- Postal code: A0B 2Y0
- Area code: 709
- Highways: Route 91; Route 100; Route 102
- Website: Town of Placentia

Placentia is a town located in the Canadian province of Newfoundland and Labrador. It consists of the amalgamated communities of Placentia ("Townside"), Southeast Placentia, Freshwater, Dunville and Jerseyside and also includes the Argentia Industrial Park.

== History ==
There is considerable evidence that Placentia Bay was intermittently occupied by Little Passage people. Their descendants, the Beothuk, continued to settle there until the 17th century. Remnants of Beothuk occupation from the surrounding area has been carbon dated back to as far as 1500 CE. Whether the Beothuk had come to permanently settle or just to fish has proved difficult to ascertain. By the late 17th century, the English and French settlers and fishermen had claimed the bays of Placentia. This effectively cut the natives off from salmon, seal, and other valuable coastal resources. This is one of several reasons attributed as to why the Beothuk eventually disappeared from Placentia, as well as several other areas of Newfoundland.

It is unclear when Placentia terrain was first settled by Europeans, but Basque fishermen from Biscay were fishing in the area as early as the beginning of the 16th century, using Placentia as a seasonal centre of operations. The last will of a Basque seaman has been discovered in an archive in Spain in which Domingo de Luca asks in 1563, “that my body be buried in this port of Plazençia in the place where those who die here are usually buried.” It is believed to be the oldest original civil document written in Canada.

Contemporary scholars think that the land called Vinland extending from Nova Scotia to L'Anse aux Meadows consisted of at least a few settlements; probably on the Avalon Peninsula too. "Placentia" may be derived from the similarly named village of Placencia de las Armas (Basque: Soraluze), which is located in the Gipuzkoa province of the Basque Country.

Placentia may also be derived from the Latin placentia ("smooth"), a name also probably given by the Basques. Placentia's large, rocky beach meant that fish could be salted and dried on the beach rocks rather than on a constructed wooden fishing stage, saving both time and effort.

In 1655, the French, who controlled more than half of the island of Newfoundland, and most of Atlantic Canada, made Placentia (French: Plaisance) their capital. They built Fort Plaisance in 1662, which was followed by Fort Royal in 1687, and Fort Saint Louis in 1691. The establishment of a fort with a garrison allowed fishermen to pursue their activities with greater safety in neighbouring harbours. The French garrisons at Plaisance were small, but despite that fact, the soldiers and French privateers managed to hold their own in the face of numerous English attacks during the two major conflicts of the Nine Years' War and the War of the Spanish Succession, which marked the colony's history. Recollect (Franciscan) friars from New France built a friary here in 1689, which lasted until the expulsion of the French in 1714. In 1692, Louis-Armand de Lom d'Arce de Lahontan, Baron de Lahontan defended the French port.

In 1711, the British Rear-Admiral Hovenden Walker considered attacking the French at Placentia with a Royal Navy fleet containing fifteen ships, armed with a total of nine hundred cannons, and transporting 4,000 soldiers. However, he decided that doing so was not a viable option.

In 1713, the Treaty of Utrecht forced the French to abandon their Placentia Bay settlements and migrate to Louisbourg, and Placentia became a British possession. Many of the French fishermen who had to abandon the fisheries in Placentia ended up at the fisheries in Isle Royale, otherwise known as Cape Breton Island. In the spring of 1714, the governor of Plaisance began organizing the emigration. Three royal ships accompanied by merchant vessels took the French residents of Placentia to the future site of Louisbourg. The group consisted of 116 men, 10 women and 23 children. The Miꞌkmaq who had resided there also abandoned Placentia following the Treaty of Utrecht. William Taverner suggested that the Miꞌkmaq left because they had been deprived of their French trading partners.

For a time in the 18th century, it still rivalled St. John's in size and importance, as evidenced by the future King William IV's summering at Placentia in 1786 and using it as his base of operations when acting as surrogate judge in Newfoundland. The town was described by the then-Prince as "a more decent settlement than any we have yet seen in Newfoundland" and was reported as having a population between 1,500 and 2,000 people.

Considering that the population of Newfoundland was reported as 8,000 11 years earlier, in 1775, Placentia's relative size and importance becomes apparent.

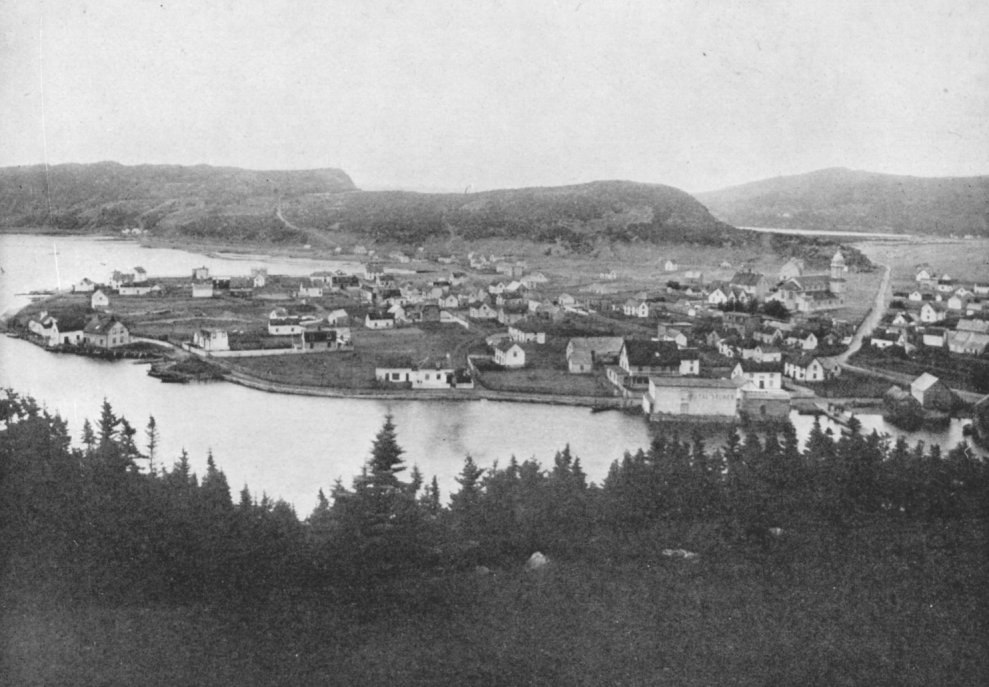
Placentia at the beginning of the 20th century.

By the 19th century, it was more fully eclipsed by St. John's and Harbour Grace, Placentia continued to be an important town, regional centre to the southern Avalon Peninsula and the eastern Burin Peninsula.

From the mid-18th century through to the 1830s, numerous Irish immigrants from counties Waterford, Wexford, Kilkenny and Cork settled in Placentia, so that the population of the modern town is largely of a mixture of West Country English and south-eastern Irish background. In the 18th century there were also a large number of settlers from the Channel Islands, from which Jerseyside, a prominent section of the town, derives its name. Some time after 1810 General George Garth was appointed as Lieutenant Governor of Placentia, a post he held until his death in 1817.

In 1940, via an agreement between the British and American governments (Newfoundland not joining Canada until 1949), a large American military base was constructed at nearby Argentia (which is now within the town of Placentia's boundaries). For a time, this was the largest American military base outside of the United States, and it played an integral role in World War II, earning the nickname "the Gibraltar of the Atlantic."

This huge development revolutionized the Placentia area both economically and culturally. Essentially, the American base introduced a widespread cash-based economy. Suddenly, people who had fished all of their lives (engaging in a type of barter called the truck system) had access to good-paying jobs on the American base. American technology enriched the living standards of Placentia residents, while the local culture was influenced strongly by the American presence. Similarly, it prompted a huge population boom, growing from 1,900 people in 1935 to well over 8,000 in the 1960s (note: these figures account for the current boundaries of Placentia, which at the time consisted of four separate towns: Placentia, Dunville, Jerseyside, and Freshwater).

The post office was established in 1851. The first postmistress in 1863 was Mary Morris.

=== Ecclesiastical history ===
On September 16, 1870, it became the seat of the Catholic pre-diocesan Apostolic Prefecture of Placentia. However, instead of becoming a diocese, the prefecture was suppressed in 1891; its territory merged into the Diocese of St. John's, Newfoundland.

== Demographics ==
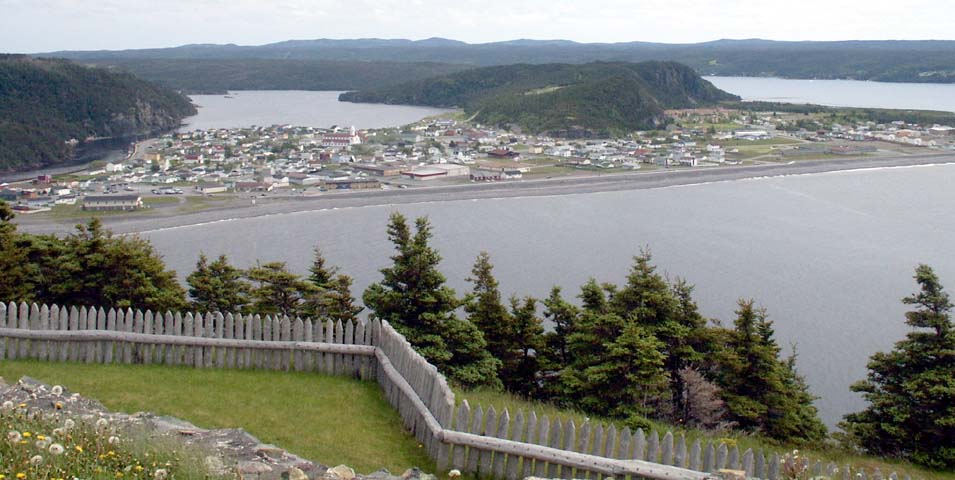
View of Placentia from Castle Hill National Historic Site, a former fort

In the 2021 Census of Population conducted by Statistics Canada, Placentia had a population of 3,289 living in 1,543 of its 1,827 total private dwellings, a change of −5.9% from its 2016 population of 3,496. With a land area of 57.8 km^{2} (22.3 sq mi), it had a population density of 56.9/km^{2} (147.4/sq mi) in 2021.

In the 2016 census, Placentia's population was reported as 3,496, down significantly from the 2001 figure of 4,426. This population decline has been ongoing since the early 1990s; in the 1996 census, Placentia was, proportionately, the 2nd fastest shrinking town in Canada, dropping from 5,515 to 5,013 between 1991 and 1996.

=== Historical demographics ===
Permanent Population of colonial Plaisance
Year	Number of inhabitants	Year	Number of inhabitants
1671	74	1673	71
1685	153	1687	119
1691	107	1693	108
1698	208	1704	158
1705	192	1706	205
1710	248	1711	189

Permanent Population of modern Placentia
Year	Number of inhabitants	Year	Number of inhabitants
1900	16,099	1921	8.504
1921	8,504	1935	8,454
1991	5,515	1996	5,013
2001	4,426	2006	3,898
2011	3,646	2016	3,498
2021	3,289		

== Economy ==
From the outset, it was fish that brought the Europeans to Newfoundland, as well as their patterns of settlement. While Placentia was considered a military base, it was also a colony with an economy based on the cod fishery and cod trade. Fishing was a consistently shared activity between French ships and resident boatkeepers. The fisheries of Placentia played a large role in ultimately securing Newfoundland as the world's largest exporter of salt codfish. After the war of 1689 had set back the colonial fishing industry, Placentia quickly renewed its seasonal fisheries, and in 1698 had sent more than 3,916 tonnes of cod to France. Following the Treaty of Utrecht, Placentia's residential fisheries met their ultimate demise.

The American base at Argentia was scaled back in the 1970s, and closed totally in 1994. This, along with the collapse of the Atlantic northwest cod fishery and the moratorium introduced by the Canadian government a few years earlier, left the town of Placentia without an economic base for some time, although recent developments by Vale Inco are beginning to stabilize the town's rocky economic situation.

== Education ==
Placentia is home to one primary education school: St. Anne's Academy, a K-6 school in Dunville. There currently exists one high school, Laval High School, which educates students from grades 7 to 12. The original Laval High School was demolished in 2010, with a new state of the art facility replacing it in September 2010. All schools are home to many extracurriculars, including student council, sports, drama and music, and volunteer organizations.

Placentia is also home to a post-secondary institution; a campus of the College of the North Atlantic, offering programs in heavy duty equipment mechanics, heavy equipment operation, welding, machinist, and industrial machinery.

== Tourism and culture ==
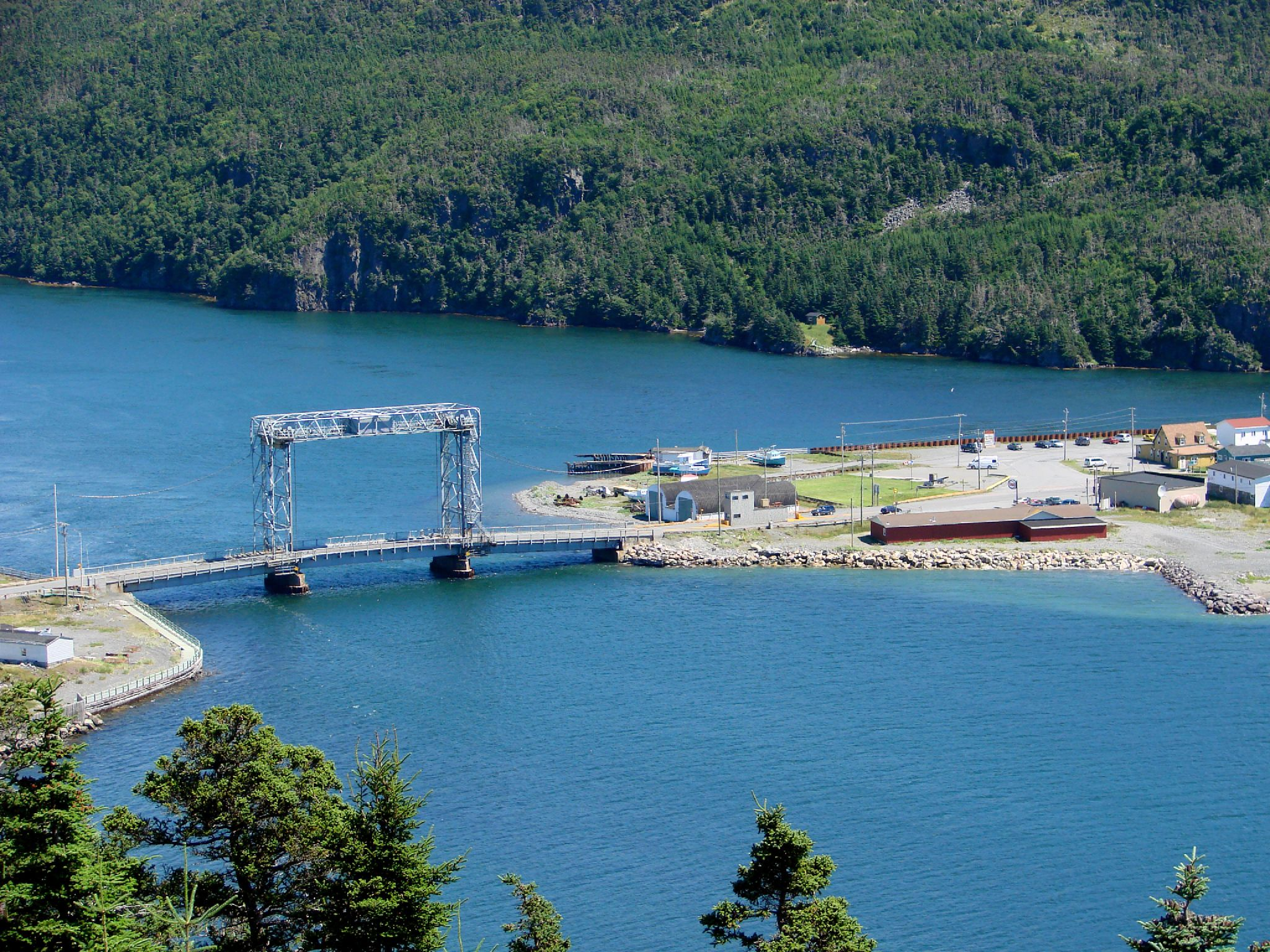
Lift bridge overseeing town.

Placentia has many features that make it a popular tourist attraction in Newfoundland and Labrador. It has a unique lift-bridge named the Sir Ambrose Shea Lift Bridge that spans the tumultuous tides of 'the gut' (the narrow opening to the harbour). Around Placentia, countless buildings and sites reflect the deep history of the area. In 1893, Harry Verran who was a mining engineer from Cornwall, England, worked for Cyrus Field. He built a historic house that now operates as a bed and breakfast called Rosedale Manor.

There are many archaeological sites (some partially re-constructed), several excellent examples of late-19th century Newfoundland architecture, two museums (O'Reilly House and Castle Hill), and one of the two Marine Atlantic ferry links from Newfoundland to Nova Scotia (via Argentia). The local historical society owns both the O'Reilly House and St. Luke's Cultural Heritage Centre (formerly St. Luke's Anglican Church) which is used to host workshops, presentations, performances, and even an escape room. It is 130 km (81 mi) from the capital city, St. John's, and is within easy distance of the scenic Cape Shore (including the Cape St. Mary's Ecological Reserve), and St. Mary's Bay, Conception Bay, and the inner reaches of Placentia Bay.

In 2009, Placentia celebrated the opening of the Placentia Bay Cultural Arts Centre with a month of artistic events, including drama productions, art exhibitions (three shows recognizing art from elementary students, high school students, and adults), and musical performances.

The town has an established summer stock theatre troupe, Placentia Area Theatre D'Heritage (PATH), which performs historical plays of significance in the Placentia area. The primary production is Faces of Fort Royale, performed at Castle Hill National Historic Site, depicting the lives of the early inhabitants of Placentia under the leadership of Governor De Brouillan. They also perform a dinner theatre cabaret set in the 1950s during the Argentia Base heyday, and a ghost walk. The troupe generally consists of post-secondary students under the direction of the province's finest theatre producers.

== Placentia in literature ==
- Hannah: The Lighthouse Girl of Newfoundland by Don Ladolcetta
- The Garden Gate: Argentia's Sacrifice for WWII by Darrell Duke
- Thursday's Storm: The August Gale of 1927 by Darrell Duke
- Swept Away by Darrell Duke

== Notable people ==
- Rex Murphy, commentator and journalist (born in Carbonear but raised in the area)
- Patricia Murphy, restaurateur who operated nine Patricia Murphy Candlelight restaurants in New York and Florida
- Greg Power, lyric poet and influential promoter of confederation with Canada
- Leonard J. Miller, businessperson and politician
- Harry Verran, politician and member of the House of Commons of Canada for South West Nova
- Alastair Ralphs, known as A-1, professional wrestler
- Sylvana Tomaselli, married to George Windsor, Earl of St Andrews
- Shannon Tweed, actress
- Agnes Walsh, poet and playwright
- Ray Guy, humorist and journalist
- Pat and Joe Byrne, Newfoundland traditional folk music group
- Tony Wakeham, 16th premier of Newfoundland and Labrador

== See also ==
- List of municipalities in Newfoundland and Labrador
- Newfoundland Railway
- Governors of Placentia
