= Beaver Wars =

17th-century conflicts in North America

- Part of the American Indian Wars
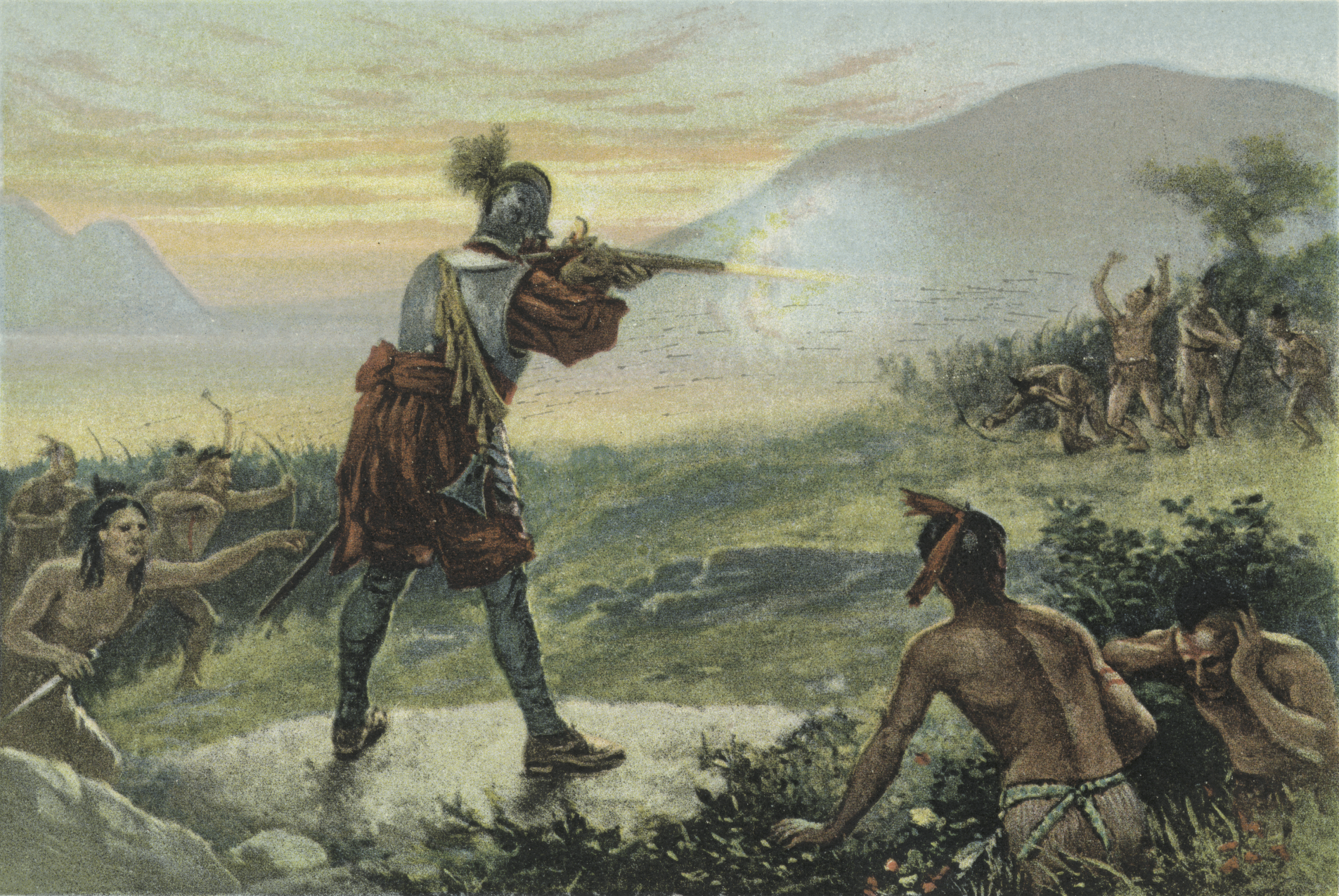
- Champlain's Battle with the Iroquois, Ticonderoga, July 1609, an 1898 illustration by Jean Leon Gerome Ferris
| Date | July 1609 – August 4, 1701 |
| Location | Great Lakes–St. Lawrence region |
| Result | Indecisive; Wendat, Petun, Neutral, Erie, and Susquehannock defeated and dispersed; Great Peace of Montreal |

Belligerents
| Haudenosaunee Confederacy; Mohawk; Oneida; Seneca; Onondaga; Cayuga; Supported by: Dutch Republic; England | Wendat (Huron); Algonquin; Susquehannock; Erie; Neutral; Petun; Odawa; Ojibwe; Mahican; Innu (Montagnais); Abenaki; Miami; Illinois; Allied with: France |

The Beaver Wars (Mohawk: Tsianì kayonkwere, pronounced [d͡ʒanî gajũgwere]), also known as the Iroquois Wars or the French and Iroquois Wars (French: Guerres franco-iroquoises), were a series of intermittent conflicts fought in the Great Lakes and St. Lawrence River regions of North America from 1609 to 1701. The wars pitted the Haudenosaunee (Iroquois), supported by the Dutch and later the English, against neighboring Indigenous nations such as the Wendat (Huron), who were allied with the French.

In the 17th century, the Haudenosaunee (a confederacy of the Mohawk, Oneida, Onondaga, Cayuga, and Seneca) inhabited territory in what is now Upstate New York south of Lake Ontario and extending east to Lake Champlain and the Hudson River. While the traditional view is that the Haudenosaunee wanted to expand their territory in order to monopolize the North American fur trade, two other theories have gained acceptance: a need for the Haudenosaunee to replenish their population after catastrophic epidemics in the 1630s, and a desire to impose the Great Law of Peace on other Iroquoian-speaking people.

Both Algonquian and Iroquoian societies were greatly disrupted by these wars. Several confederacies and nations, including the Wendat, Erie, Neutral, Petun, and Susquehannock were defeated and dispersed. Survivors fled to neighbouring tribes or were forcibly adopted into the Haudenosaunee. A number of Algonquian nations were also directly attacked. The conflict abated when the Haudenosaunee lost their Dutch allies in New Netherland after the English seized the colony in 1664. The Haudenosaunee soon established an alliance with the English, and periodically fought against the French until the Great Peace of Montreal was signed in 1701.

As a result of the wars, the Haudenosaunee became the dominant political power in the region. They considerably expanded their territory—including into the Ohio River valley—redrawing the map of eastern North America.

== Background ==
During his three voyages to the New World in the mid-16th century, French explorer Jacques Cartier produced the first written records of Indigenous groups inhabiting the shores of the Gulf of St. Lawrence and the St. Lawrence River. Cartier wrote of encounters with the St. Lawrence Iroquoians, also known as the Laurentian Iroquois, who occupied several fortified villages along the river, including Stadacona and Hochelaga. He recorded an ongoing war between the inhabitants of Stadacona and another group known as the Toudamans.

Wars and politics in Europe distracted French efforts at colonization until the beginning of the 17th century, when Samuel de Champlain founded Quebec. Champlain discovered that both Stadacona and Hochelaga had disappeared and that the river valley was uninhabited, having become an area where the Haudenosaunee hunted and the Wendat traveled to trade with the Algonquin and Innu. The causes remain unclear, although some anthropologists and historians have suggested that the Mohawk, the easternmost nation of the Haudenosaunee Confederacy, destroyed or drove out the St. Lawrence Iroquoians.

Seeking to secure the future of his colony, Champlain accepted an invitation to join a long-standing alliance of the Innu, Algonquin, and Wendat against the Haudenosaunee. Joining the alliance gave the French access to furs, trading networks, and Indigenous knowledge. For their part, the Wendat and their allies gained access to European goods, strengthening their position against their Haudenosaunee rivals.

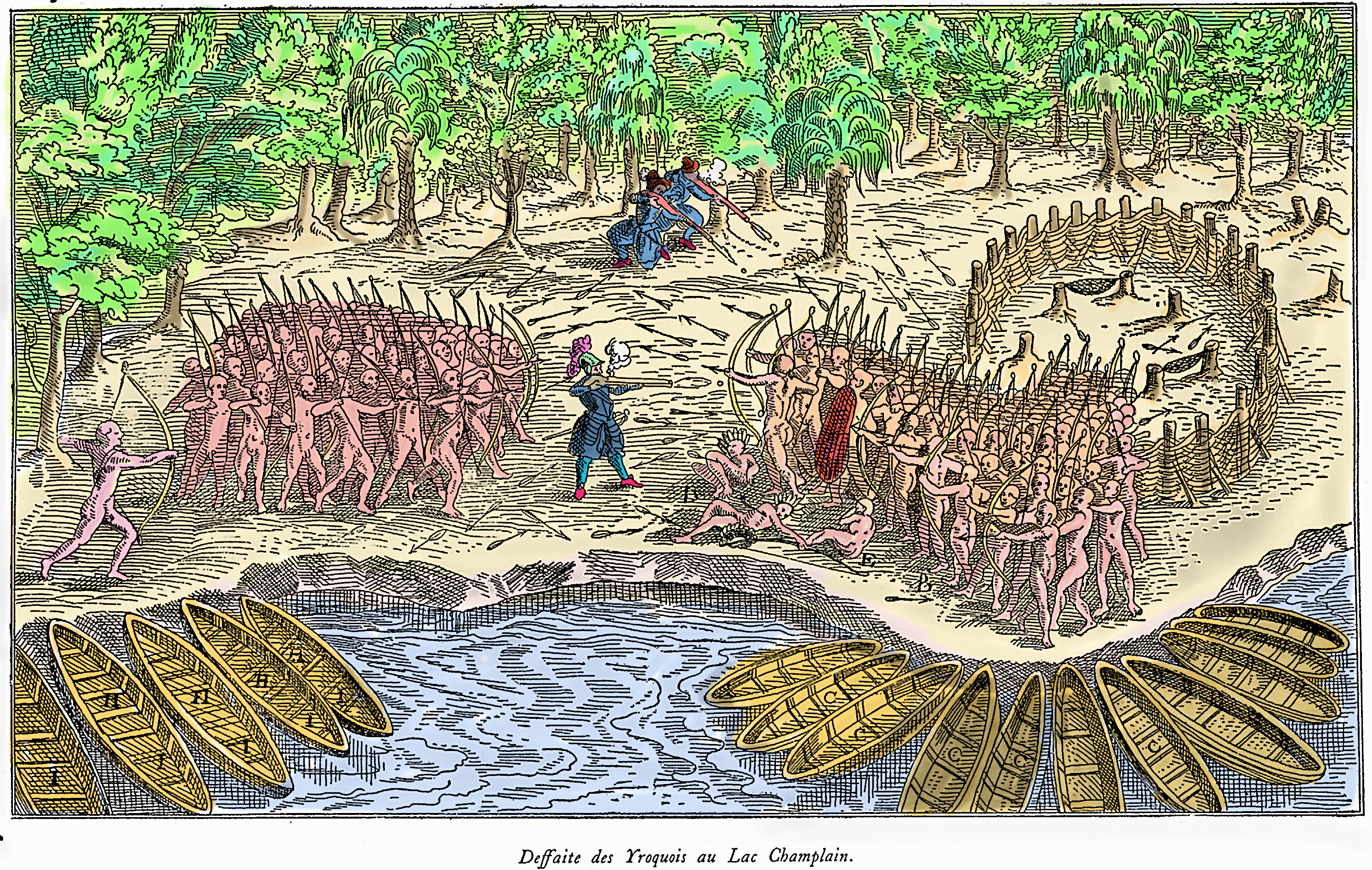
In 1609, Samuel de Champlain and two of his men joined an Algonquin and Wendat war party in an attack on the Mohawk.

In the summer of 1609, Champlain demonstrated his willingness to support his Indigenous partners by joining them in an attack on the Haudenosaunee. Champlain wrote, "I had come with no other intention than to make war." They engaged in a pitched battle against the Mohawks on the shores of Lake Champlain. Champlain's opening shot with his arquebus killed two Mohawk leaders despite their "arrow-proof body armor made of plaited sticks." The Mohawk fled but the battle sparked almost a century of conflict.

In 1610, Champlain helped the Algonquin defeat a large Haudenosaunee raiding party near the mouth of the Richelieu River. In 1615, while visiting the Wendat homeland (Wendake), he was invited to join a war party planning to besiege a fortified Haudenosaunee village south of Lake Ontario. The attack failed, and Champlain was injured.

Between 1610 and 1614, the Dutch established a number of trading posts along the Hudson and Delaware Rivers, including Fort Nassau on Castle Island. This post sat within the heart of Mahican territory, which at the time straddled both banks of the Hudson. Initially, the Haudenosaunee were forced to rely on Indigenous intermediaries—primarily the Mahicans—to acquire European goods. This changed following the Mohawk–Mahican War (1624–1628), when the Mohawks defeated the Mahican and secured direct access to Fort Orange, built in 1624 as a replacement for Fort Nassau. By the 1630s, the Dutch were regularly supplying the Haudenosaunee with metal tools in exchange for beaver pelts. The high demand for furs, combined with a growing dependence on European goods, led to a severe depletion of beaver populations within Haudenosaunee territory.

Flintlock muskets acquired from the Dutch allowed the Haudenosaunee to wage effective campaigns against neighboring nations.

Champlain was reluctant to provide firearms to his Indigenous allies. His unwillingness to arm them eventually became official French policy. Only Wendat leaders who converted to Catholicism and demonstrated a deep commitment to the faith were rewarded with flintlock muskets. This policy eventually created a significant technological imbalance when the Haudenosaunee began acquiring firearms from Dutch traders in the late 1630s, a disparity that contributed to the later defeat and dispersal of the Wendat.

At first, the Dutch were also hesitant to trade firearms for furs; however, independent "free traders" ignored Dutch West India Company regulations and sold muskets to the Haudenosaunee. In 1643, as a direct result of Kieft's War—a conflict between New Netherland and the Algonquian tribes of the lower Hudson River valley—Dutch authorities decided to facilitate the acquisition of 400 muskets specifically for the Mohawk.

Geographically, the Haudenosaunee were constrained in their ability to trade furs for European goods. To the south, the Susquehannock controlled an important trade route linking the interior to European markets on the Chesapeake, while the Erie and Neutral blocked access to hunting grounds to the west. To the north and northwest, the Wendat (Huron) Confederacy and the Algonquin controlled access to the fur-rich territories of the Canadian Shield. By the 1640s, these geographic constraints, combined with rival European alliances, helped disrupt the balance of power in the Great Lakes region.

== Causes ==
The traditional explanation for the Beaver Wars centers on the North American fur trade. As the Haudenosaunee became dependent on European goods, they needed beaver pelts to trade with the Dutch at Fort Orange. In The Wars of the Iroquois, George T. Hunt argued that because local beaver populations were exhausted by the 1630s, the Haudenosaunee launched wars to seize new hunting grounds, control trade routes, and establish themselves as the middlemen between the western nations and the Europeans. According to this theory, the attacks on the Wendat, Erie, and Neutral nations were a strategic effort to control the fur trade by forcing the flow of pelts to the Dutch rather than to the French on the St. Lawrence River.

Ethnohistorians like Bruce Trigger, however, have criticized this theory as Eurocentric. In The Children of Aataentsic, Trigger argued that Hunt's model treats the Haudenosaunee as having been driven by Western market logic. This perspective reduces the Haudenosaunee to surrogate Europeans and ignores their internal social and spiritual motivations. Critics suggest that the fur trade provided the means for war, but it was not the primary cause. By focusing solely on the role of middlemen, the traditional narrative overlooks the impact of epidemics and the requirements of the Great Law of Peace, the oral constitution that established the Haudenosaunee Confederacy.

While "control of the fur trade" is the traditional explanation, two other theories have gained wide acceptance. In The Ordeal of the Longhouse, Daniel Richter argues that the "mourning war" was a primary driver of Haudenosaunee military expansion during the 17th century. This cultural practice was a response to the massive loss of life caused by European diseases like smallpox in the 1630s. In Haudenosaunee society, the death of a family member often required a raid to capture a replacement from an enemy group. This captive would then be formally adopted, taking the name and social role of the deceased. As epidemics decimated their population, the Haudenosaunee launched larger and more frequent raids to maintain their numbers and social stability. Richter suggests that this created a cycle of violence where the need to replace the dead led to more combat, which in turn caused more deaths that required further captives.

Francis Jennings, in The Ambiguous Iroquois Empire, proposed that the Beaver Wars were also fueled by a desire to impose the Great Law of Peace on other Iroquoian-speaking nations. The Haudenosaunee Confederacy was governed by this Great Law, which aimed to end internal conflict by uniting related tribes under a single political structure. Jennings suggests that the Confederacy viewed groups like the Wendat as wayward relatives who refused to join this union. By attacking these nations, the Haudenosaunee were not seeking to exterminate them, but to force their political submission and eventual absorption into the "Longhouse"—a process described as "extending the rafters." From this perspective, the conflict was an ideological mission to create regional stability by bringing all Iroquoian peoples under a shared set of laws and spiritual traditions.

In Your Fyre Shall Burn No More, José António Brandão provides quantitative evidence that Haudenosaunee policy was driven by these internal needs rather than commercial gain. He argues that the "middleman" thesis is unsupported by the record of raids, which consistently prioritized the capture of people over the seizure of pelts. By "extending the rafters" to include adopted peoples, the Confederacy transformed a crisis of survival into a period of territorial expansion.

These explanations for Haudenosaunee aggression in the seventeenth century are complementary rather than mutually exclusive. The Beaver Wars were not a single, continuous conflict driven by one objective, but a series of distinct conflicts fought at different times and for different reasons. They cannot, therefore, be understood solely in terms of competition over the fur trade. While economic interests played an important role, demographic pressures and the desire to extend the Great Law of Peace were also significant motivations.

== Major Campaigns and Conflicts ==
In the summer of 1638, the Wenro made the strategic decision to leave their territory between the Neutral and the Haudenosaunee. The Neutral had previously protected the Wenro from the Seneca, the westernmost nation of the Haudenosaunee, but for unknown reasons had withdrawn their support leaving them open to raids. Instead of waiting to be destroyed, the Wenro sent a delegation to the Wendat and asked for asylum. Subsequently, over 600 Wenro refugees traveled 80 leagues (240 miles) through Neutral territory to reach the village of Ossossané on Nottawasaga Bay. Though many arrived suffering from disease, they successfully integrated into the Wendat Confederacy.

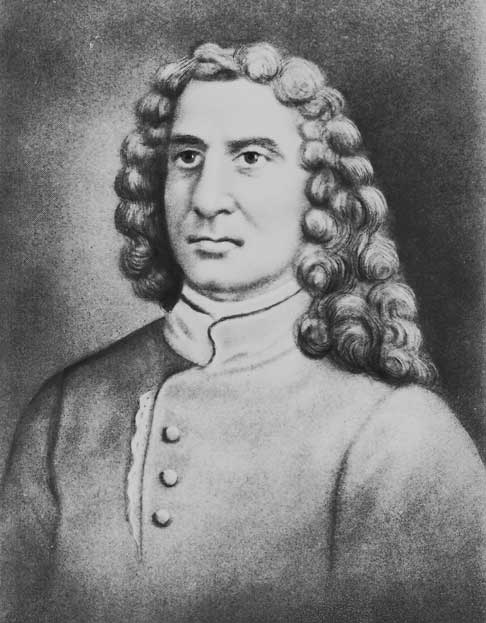
New France's governor Charles de Montmagny rejected peace with the Mohawk in 1641 because it would imply abandonment of their Wendat allies.

While conflict between the Haudenosaunee and the French can be traced to 1609, it did not escalate significantly until the early 1640s. In the aftermath of Champlain's visit to Wendake in 1615, the Wendat started a regular trade in furs with the French at Quebec. Trade was briefly halted when the English captured the settlement in 1628. Once the French returned four years later, the volume of trade increased. In the late 1630s, however, the Mohawk begun ambushing Wendat trading expeditions en route, and within a few years, had effectively blocked travel on the St. Lawrence and Ottawa Rivers. In 1642, the Mohawk launched their first raids against French settlements, including the new outpost of Ville Marie de Montréal. This was the beginning of the Petite Guerre, characterized by frequent small-scale raids that made farming and travel outside the walls of Montreal, Trois-Rivières, and Quebec increasingly hazardous.

Diplomatic efforts during this period were unsuccessful. In 1641, Mohawk representatives proposed a peace treaty that would have established a trading post in their territory, but Governor Charles de Montmagny rejected the offer, fearing that it would jeopardize New France's relationship with its Wendat allies. A second attempt in 1645, led by the Mohawk orator Kiotseaeton, produced a truce that lasted just over a year. The lull in hostilities allowed a record number of furs to be exported from New France in 1746. When the truce collapsed, hostilities resumed, but the focus had now turned to the destruction of Wendake.

=== Destruction of Wendake ===
Traditionally, Wendat and Haudenosaunee warriors engaged in reciprocal warfare consisting of small raids and ambushes intended to take captives, avenge deaths, and gain prestige. Captives were either adopted into families who had lost a member, or ritually tortured and executed. Large-scale attacks on villages and pitched battles were comparatively rare. This pattern began to change in the 1630s as competition over the fur trade, unequal access to firearms, and epidemics intensified the conflict. During the 1640s, the Seneca, Cayuga and Onondaga launched larger and more frequent raids against the Wendat. Most of these raids were against the Arendarhonon, the easternmost nation of the Wendat. Wendat warriors successfully repulsed some Haudenosaunee war parties, but were only rarely able to retaliate against Haudenosaunee villages.

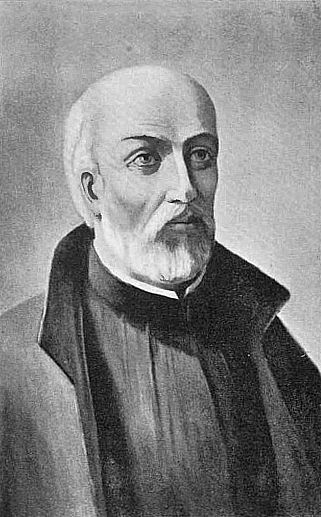
Jean de Brébeuf was one of several Jesuit missionaries killed by the Haudenosaunee.

In 1647, the Wendat pursued peace with the Onondaga through several diplomatic channels. A Susquehannock delegation arrived in Wendake and offered to mediate, while Annenraes, an influential Onondaga warrior who had been captured and later released by the Wendat, returned to his people and persuaded an Onondaga war party to abandon its planned invasion. These interventions helped prompt the Onondaga to send an embassy to Wendake in July, followed by a Wendat embassy to the Onondaga in August. The negotiations continued throughout the autumn, but ultimately failed to bring a lasting peace amid strong opposition from the Seneca and Mohawk.

In the fall of 1647, The Arendarhonon abandoned their villages near Lake Couchiching, including their principal village of Contarea, and moved west to Teanaostaiaé and several other villages.

The war against the Wendat culminated in the devastating attacks of 1648 and 1649. Teanaostaiaé fell in July 1648. Hundreds were killed or captured, and the survivors fled. That autumn, the Seneca and Mohawk assembled an army of over 1000 warriors, many armed with Dutch muskets, who wintered north of Lake Ontario. On March 16, 1649, they overwhelmed the village of Taenhatentaron (St. Ignace). A day later, the Wendat defenders at St. Louis withstood two assaults before the defences were breached. Two Jesuit missionaries, Jean de Brébeuf and Gabriel Lalemant, were captured, taken to Taenhatentaron, tortured, and killed.

The Wendat inflicted numerous casualties on the Haudenosaunee in a counterattack a few days later, however, this success proved insufficient to halt the destruction of Wendake. In June 1649, the Jesuits decided to abandon the mission settlement of Sainte-Marie among the Hurons in order to prevent it from falling into Haudenosaunee hands. The Wendat burned their remaining villages and dispersed. Some sought refuge among the Petun and Neutral. Pthers fled to Gahoendoe (Christian Island), where many perished from starvation and exposure during the winter of 1650. The few hundred who survived abandoned the island in the summer of 1650 and accompanied Jesuit missionaries to the relative safety of the French settlements near Quebec.

=== Dispersal of the Petun, Neutral and Erie ===
Following the collapse of the Wendat Confederacy, the Haudenosaunee turned their attention to the neighboring nations that had provided refuge to displaced survivors. In late 1649, they launched a lightning campaign against the Petun, whose villages lay just west of the former Wendat heartland. The destruction of the principal Petun town, Etharita, resulted in the death of Jesuit missionary Noël Chabanel and the capture of many inhabitants. Rather than remain to face further incursions, the surviving Petun, joined by a significant number of Wendat and Wenro refugees, fled northwest toward the safety of Michilimackinac.

The Neutral Confederacy, the most populous of the regional groups, first faced Haudenosaunee aggression in 1647, when the Seneca destroyed a large frontier town in retaliation for a private dispute involving a Seneca warrior. While this initial strike did not lead to immediate war, the Neutral became the Haudenosaunee's primary target in 1650 and 1651. Despite their long-standing policy of non-alignment, the Neutral were attacked after allegedly allowing Wendat refugees to use their territory as a base for counter-raids. The Haudenosaunee captured several major fortified towns, and the Neutral defense quickly crumbled under the weight of these coordinated assaults. While many survivors were absorbed through mass adoption into the Haudenosaunee, others fled the region, seeking safety among the Erie to the south or crossing into the territory of present-day Michigan, leaving the lands north of Lake Erie largely depopulated.

The Erie welcomed a large numbers of Neutral and Wendat refugees into their territory south of Lake Erie. These displaced groups advocated for revenge against the Haudenosaunee, further straining relations between the two powers. Tensions shifted into open warfare after the Erie ambushed an Onondaga war party and captured a prominent chief, who was subsequently killed. In a desperate attempt to restore peace, the Erie sent a thirty-man delegation to the Onondaga, but during the negotiations, a dispute broke out and the Onondaga killed the entire Erie delegation.

This diplomatic failure was followed by a major Onondaga and Seneca invasion in the summer of 1654. An army of roughly 1,200 warriors besieged a fortified Erie position, eventually breaching the palisades by using their canoes as shields and ladders. The Jesuit Relations describes the battle as one of extreme carnage, noting that the Haudenosaunee acted with a level of brutality toward the Erie that far exceeded their typical conduct in war. By 1656, the Erie were utterly defeated. While some survivors were taken as captives and adopted into the western Haudenosaunee nations, a remnant of the Erie may have fled south, initially to Virginia but later to the Savannah River where they became known as the slave-trading Westo.

=== New France: The Years of Survival (1649–1665) ===
Depiction of Adam Dollard des Ormeaux at the Battle of Long Sault, May 1660

While the Seneca and Onondaga had focused on defeating the nations to their west, the Mohawk had targeted New France. They continued to blockade the Ottawa River preventing Algonquian trappers from bringing beaver pelts to the French, and pressured the Wendat refugees living near Montreal, Trois-Rivières and Quebec to join them. A raid on the Île d'Orléans in 1656 caused the surviving Wendat to flee the island and seek safety within the walls of Quebec.

In 1653, a force of 600 Mohawk warriors besieged Trois-Rivières. The settlement was vulnerable after losing 22 soldiers and settlers to an ambush the year before. 40 French militia and their Wendat and Algonquin allies successfully defended the town for nine days from behind a strong palisade. The siege ended when negotiations led by militia captain Pierre Boucher resulted in a truce.

After negotiations with the Onondaga, the French built a mission called Sainte-Marie de Gannentaha on Onondaga Lake. This was an insult to the Mohawk, the Confederacy's "Keepers of the Eastern Door," who believed they should handle all negotiations with Europeans. They were also concerned that they might lose their status as the only Haudenosaunee nation with direct access to European goods. In 1658, however, the Jesuit missionaries at Gannentaha fled after realizing that they were effectively hostages.

An important figure during this period was Canaqueese, a Mohawk leader of Dutch and Haudenosaunee descent. Known to the French as Bâtard Flamand (Flemish Bastard), Canaqueese led diplomatic missions to Quebec to return prisoners and propose truces. These truces were often delaying tactics that allowed the Mohawk to go to the Dutch at Albany and rearm.

In 1660, the French thwarted a major attack on Montreal at the Battle of Long Sault. Although Adam Dollard des Ormeaux and all of sixteen militia were killed, along with a number of Wendat and Algonquins, the heavy losses they inflicted convinced the combined Mohawk, Oneida, and Onondaga forces to call off the attack.

=== French counterattack ===
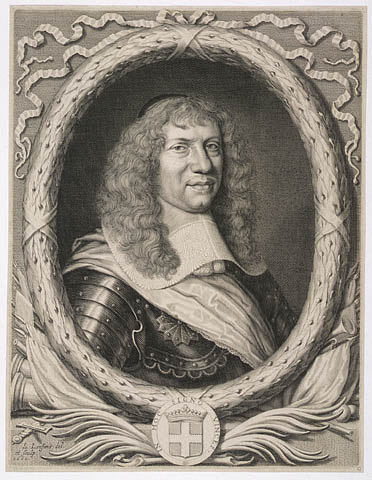
In 1666, Alexandre de Prouville de Tracy led a French force of 1,300 men to attack Mohawk villages in New York.

The following year was one of the bloodiest for New France. Haudenosaunee war parties killed or captured over 100 settlers. This led Pierre Boucher, now Governor of Trois-Rivières, to travel to France and beg King Louis XIV for help. The king took several steps to ensure the survival of the colony. He dispatched the professional soldiers of the Le Régiment de Carignan-Salières to New France and appointed Alexandre de Prouville de Tracy as Lieutenant Général of the Americas with orders to take the war to the Haudenosaunee. Permission was also granted to sell arms to New France's Indigenous allies.

In 1664, the Dutch surrendered control of New Netherland to the English. The English quickly sought to maintain peaceful relations and expand trade with the Haudenosaunee but were less inclined to provide them with military support against the French.

Following the arrival of the Carignan-Salières in the summer of 1665, the Onondaga, Seneca, Cayuga, and Oneida began peace talks with the French. The Mohawk, however, remained unwilling to negotiate.

In January 1666, Governor Daniel de Rémy de Courcelle led an expedition of approximately 500 regular soldiers and colonial volunteers against the Mohawk homeland. Ill-equipped for the harsh winter conditions, the force lacked adequate provisions and essential equipment, including snowshoes, making progress through the deep snow difficult. The French briefly skirmished with Mohawk warriors near the Dutch settlement of Schenectady but failed to reach any Mohawk villages and eventually withdrew.

A subsequent invasion of Mohawk territory was led by Tracy. Roughly 1,300 men set out in September 1666 and reached the Mohawk villages in mid-October. The villages had been hastily abandoned, and Tracy ordered their longhouses and palisades destroyed, along with the crops growing in the surrounding fields. The expedition then returned to New France. Although a direct battle was avoided, the destruction of the crops deprived the Mohawk of a vital source of food for the coming winter and contributed to their reluctant decision to negotiate peace.

Following his return to Quebec, Tracy ordered a Mohawk captive hanged. He then sent Canaqueese, a Mohawk intermediary of mixed Mohawk and Dutch ancestry, back to the Mohawk to convey his terms. These included the return of Algonquin and Wendat captives held by the Mohawk and Oneida, and the provision of hostages to guarantee compliance. When his terms were not initially met, Tracy threatened another invasion. A settlement was finally reached in July 1667, when Mohawk and Oneida representatives brought hostages to Quebec and requested permission for Jesuit missionaries to establish missions in their territories.

=== Peace with France and Haudenosaunee expansion ===
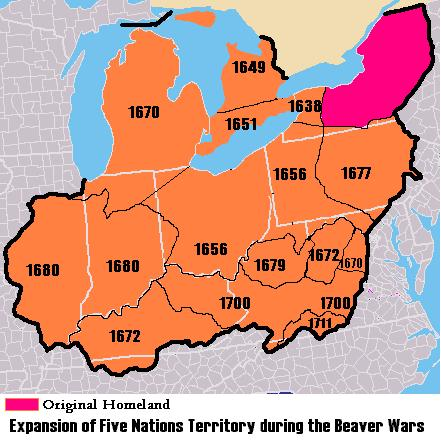
Haudenosaunee conquests during the Beaver Wars, overlaid over modern United States boundaries for reference.

Once peace was achieved with the French, the Haudenosaunee returned to their westward conquest in their continued attempt to take control of all the land between the Algonquins and the French. Eastern tribes such as the Lakotas were pushed across the Mississippi onto the Great Plains in the early 18th century, where they adopted the horse culture and nomadic lifestyle for which they later became known. Other refugees flooded the Great Lakes area, resulting in a conflict with existing tribes in the region. In the Ohio Country, the Shawnee and Miami tribes were dominant. The Haudenosaunee quickly overran Shawnee holdings in central Ohio, forcing them to flee into Miami territory. The Miamis were a powerful tribe and brought together a confederacy of their neighboring allies, including the Potawatomi and the Illini confederation who inhabited Michigan and Illinois. The majority of the fighting was between the Anishinaabeg Confederacy and the Haudenosaunee Confederacy.

The Haudenosaunee improved on their warfare as they continued to attack even farther from their home. War parties often traveled by canoes at night, and they would sink their canoes and fill them with rocks to hold them on the river bottom. They would then move through the woods to a target and burst from the wood to cause the greatest panic. After the attack, they returned to their boats and left before any significant resistance could be put together. The lack of firearms caused the Algonquin tribes the greatest disadvantage. Despite their larger numbers, they were not centralized enough to mount a united defense and were unable to withstand the Haudenosaunee. Several tribes ultimately moved west beyond the Mississippi River, leaving much of the Ohio Valley, southern Michigan, and southern Ontario depopulated. Several Anishinaabe forces numbering in the thousands remained to the north of Lakes Huron and Superior, and they were later decisive in rolling back the Haudenosaunee advance. From west of the Mississippi, displaced groups continued to arm war parties and attempt to retake their land.

Beginning in the 1670s, the French began to explore and settle the Ohio and Illinois Country from the Mississippi and Ohio rivers, and they established the post of Tassinong to trade with the western tribes. The Haudenosaunee destroyed it to retain control of the fur trade with the Europeans. The Haudenosaunee also drove the Mannahoac tribe out of the northern Virginia Piedmont region in 1670, and they claimed the land by right of conquest as a hunting ground. The English acknowledged this claim in 1674 and again in 1684, but they acquired the land from the Haudenosaunee by a 1722 treaty.

During a raid into the Illinois Country in 1689, the Haudenosaunee captured numerous prisoners and destroyed a sizable Miami settlement. The Miami asked for aid from others in the Anishinaabeg Confederacy, and a large force gathered to track down the Haudenosaunee. Using their new firearms, the Confederacy laid an ambush near South Bend, Indiana, and they attacked and destroyed most of the Haudenosaunee party, and a large part of the region was left depopulated. The Haudenosaunee were unable to establish a permanent presence, as their tribe was unable to colonize the large area, and the Haudenosaunee's brief control over the region was lost. Many of the former inhabitants of the territory began to return.

=== Dispersal of the Susquehannock ===
With the tribes destroyed to the north and west, the Haudenosaunee turned their attention southward to the Susquehannock. The Susquehannock attained the peak of their influence in the 1650s, and they were able to use that to their advantage in the following decades. In the winter of 1652, the Susquehannock were attacked by the Mohawk, and although the attack was repulsed, it led to the Susquehannock negotiating Articles of Peace and Friendship with Maryland.

An Oneida raid on the Piscataway in 1660 led Maryland to expand its peace treaty with the Susquehannock into an alliance. The Maryland Assembly authorized armed assistance, and described the Susquehannock as "a Bullwarke and Security of the Northern Parts of this Province." Fifty men were sent to help defend the main Susquehannock town. Muskets, lead and powder were acquired from both Maryland and New Netherland. Despite suffering a smallpox epidemic in 1661, the Susquehannock easily withstood a siege by 800 Seneca, Cayuga and Onondaga in May 1663, and further destroyed an Onondaga war party in 1666.

War between the Haudenosaunee and Susquehannock continued intermittently until 1674 when the Maryland colonists terminated their alliance with the Susquehannock and negotiated peace with the Haudenosaunee. Many historians believe that the Haudenosaunee inflicted a major defeat on the Susquehannock c. 1674 since the Jesuit Relations for 1675 reports that the Seneca "utterly defeated ... their ancient and redoubtable foes."

In 1675, Susquehannock refugees moved south into Maryland. Later that year the militias of Virginia and Maryland besieged the Susquehannock fort, and assassinated the Susquehannock chiefs during a parley. The survivors of the siege were eventually absorbed by the Haudenosaunee.

=== Resumption of war with France ===
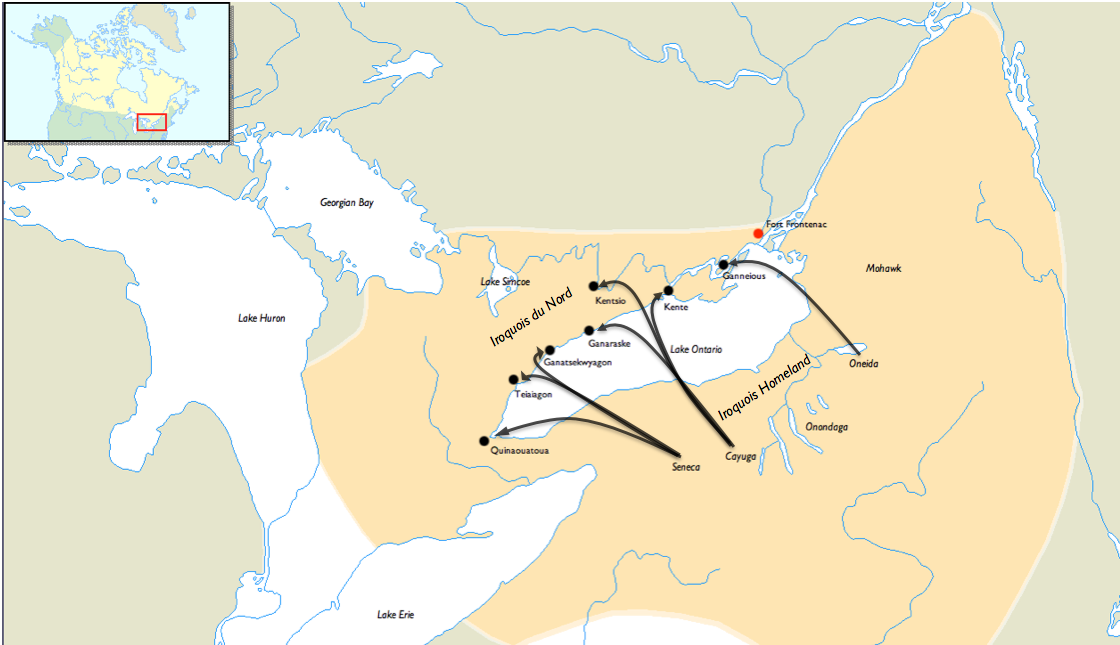
The Neutral Haudenosaunee settlements established between 1665 and 1670 north of Lake Ontario, after conquering that territory. With the Great Peace of Montreal they would be abandoned and the region occupied by the Mississauga (1701).[105]

English settlers began to move into the former Dutch territory of upper New York State, and the colonists began to form close ties with the Haudenosaunee as an alliance in the face of French colonial expansion. They began to supply the Haudenosaunee with firearms as the Dutch had. At the same time, New France's governor Louis de Buade tried to revive the western fur trade. His efforts competed with those of the Haudenosaunee to control the traffic and they started attacking the French again. The war lasted ten years.

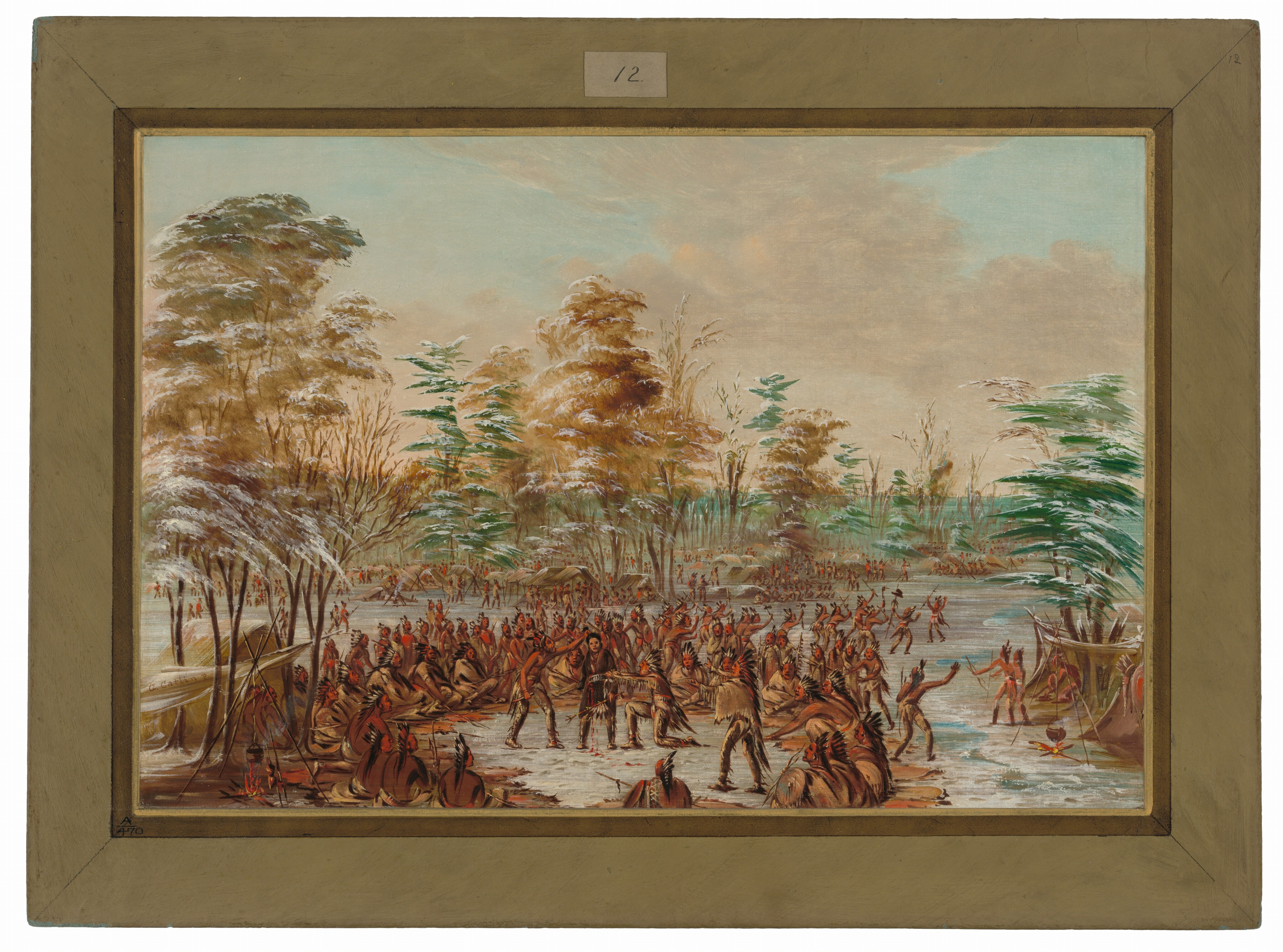
De Tonty suing for peace in the Haudenosaunee village, January 2, 1680

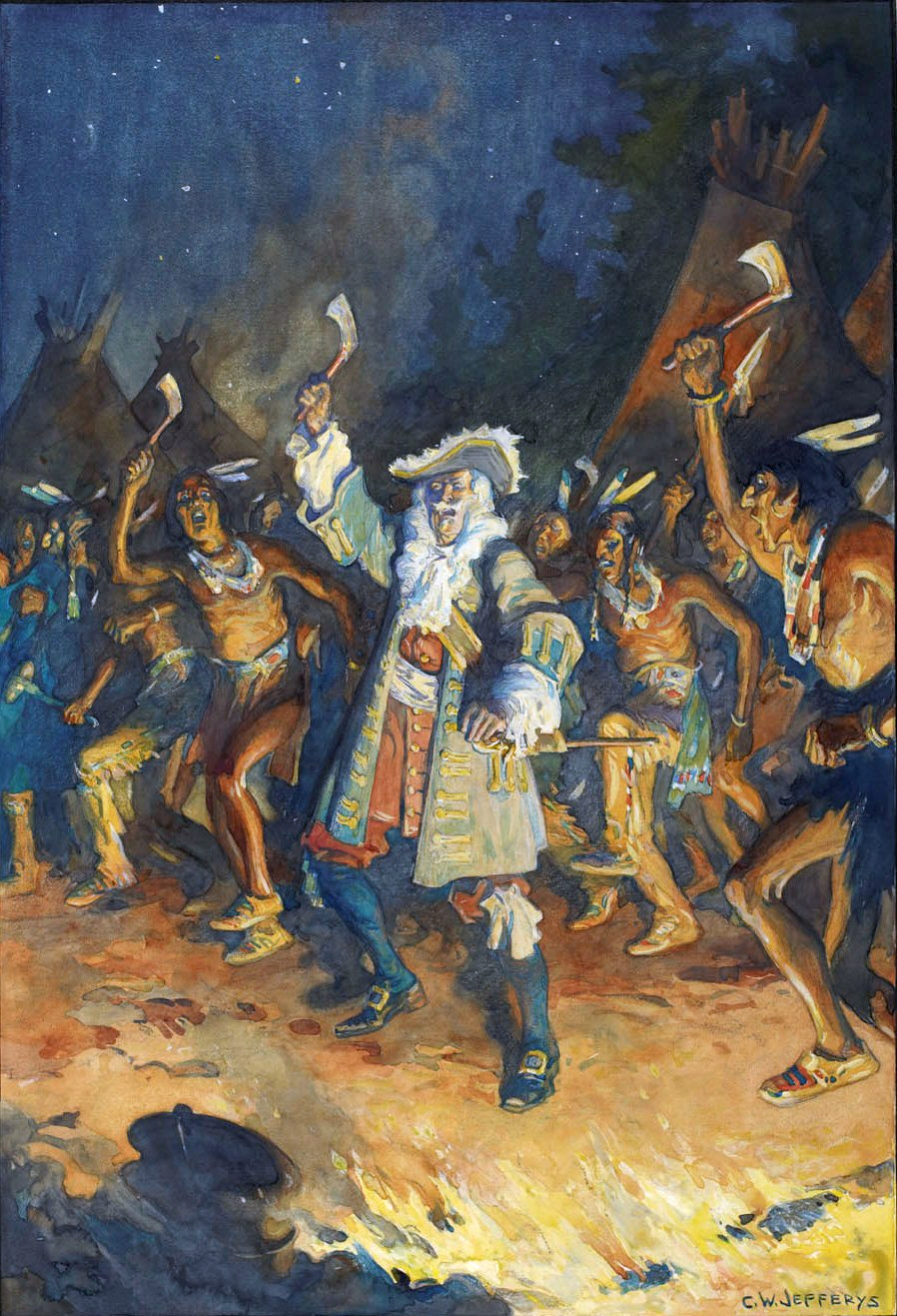
New France's Governor General Louis de Buade de Frontenac with Indian allies; his attempts to revive the fur-trade in the frontier led to renewed hostilities with the Haudenosaunee.

In 1681, René-Robert Cavelier, Sieur de La Salle, negotiated a treaty with the Miami and Illinois tribes. France lifted the ban on the sale of firearms to the Indians, and colonists quickly armed the Algonquin tribes, evening the odds between the Haudenosaunee and their enemies.

With the renewal of hostilities, the militia of New France was strengthened after 1683 by a small force of regular French navy troops in the Compagnies Franches de la Marine, who constituted the longest serving unit of French regular troops in New France. In June 1687, Governor Denonville and Pierre de Troyes set out with a well organized force to Fort Frontenac. Denonville captured 58 male prisoners and 36 of these were later shipped to Marseille, France to be galley slaves. (13 men survived and eventually returned to Canada.) He then travelled down the shore of Lake Ontario and built Fort Denonville at the site where the Niagara River meets Lake Ontario. This site was previously used by La Salle for Fort Conti from 1678 to 1679, and was later used for Fort Niagara which still exists. The Haudenosaunee retaliated by destroying farmsteads and slaughtering entire families. They burned Lachine to the ground on August 4, 1689. Frontenac replaced Denonville as governor for the next nine years (1689–1698).

During King William's War (1688–1697), the French formed raiding parties with Indian allies to attack English settlements, (as the English had allied themselves with the Haudenosaunee against the French) perpetrating the Schenectady massacre in the colony of New York, the Raid on Salmon Falls in New Hampshire, and the Battle of Fort Loyal in Portland, Maine. The French and their allies killed settlers in the raids and kidnapped some and took them back to Canada. Settlers in New England raised money to redeem the captives, but some were adopted into the tribes. The French government generally did not intervene when the Indians kept the captives. Throughout the 1690s, the French and their allies also continued to raid deep into Haudenosaunee territory, destroying Mohawk villages in 1692 and raiding Seneca, Oneida, and Onondaga villages. The English and Haudenosaunee banded together for operations aimed against the French, but these were largely ineffective. The most successful incursion resulted in the 1691 Battle of La Prairie. The French offensive was not halted by the 1697 Treaty of Ryswick that brought peace between France and England, ending English participation in that conflict.

In the autumn of 1699, a party of "Dowaganhaes" (likely Ojibwe) killed Senecas close by one of the Seneca towns. The penetration so far into Haudenosaunee territory suggested a decisive turn in the military situation. Haudenosaunee hunters were unable to seek beaver north of Lake Ontario for "fear that the French again will incite their Indians to fall upon" them.

== Peace ==
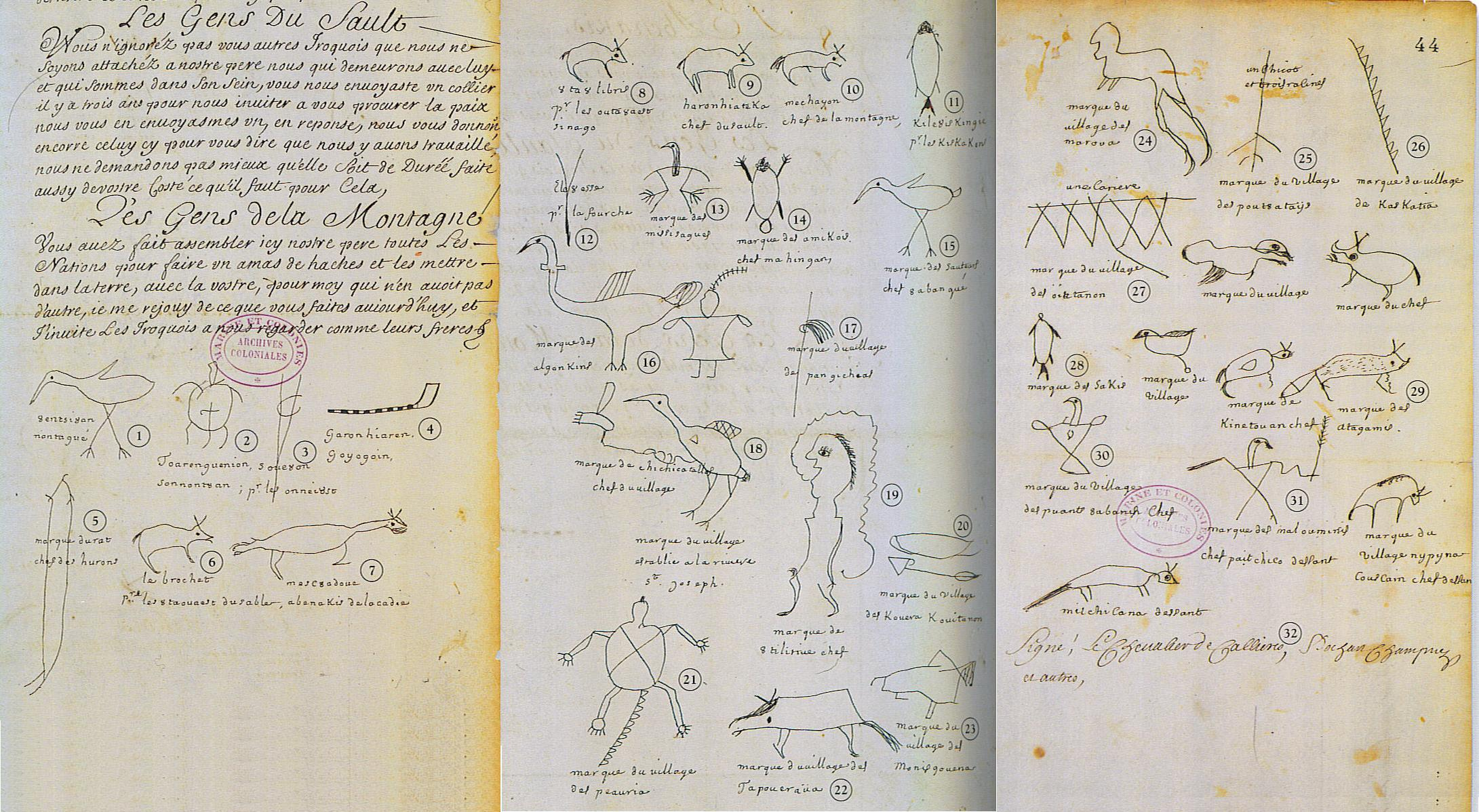
A copy of the peace treaty that ended hostilities between New France and 39 First Nations

The Haudenosaunee eventually began to see the emerging Thirteen Colonies as a greater threat than the French in 1698. The colony of Pennsylvania was founded in 1681, and the continued growth there began to encroach on the southern border of the Haudenosaunee. The French policy began to change towards the Haudenosaunee after nearly fifty years of warfare, and they decided that befriending them would be the easiest way to ensure their monopoly on the northern fur trade. The Thirteen Colonies heard of the treaty and immediately set about to prevent it from being agreed upon. These conflicts would result in the loss of Albany's fur trade with the Haudenosaunee and, without their protection, the northern flank of the Thirteen Colonies would be open to French attack. Nevertheless, the French and Indians signed the treaty.

The French and 39 Indigenous leaders signed the Great Peace of Montreal in 1701. The Haudenosaunee agreed to stop marauding and to allow refugees from the Great Lakes to return east. The Shawnee eventually regained control of the Ohio Country and the lower Allegheny River. The Miami returned to take control of Indiana and northwest Ohio. The Pottawatomie went to Michigan, and the Illini to Illinois. The peace lasted into the 1720s.

== Genocide debate ==
The brutal nature of Haudenosaunee warfare has led some scholars to classify the Beaver Wars as acts of genocide. Others disagree, suggesting that Haudenosaunee actions during the Beaver Wars "do not easily conform to definitions of genocide that suggest complete extermination." It has been argued that the Haudenosaunee practice of mass adoption—integrating thousands of captives as full members of their society—is the opposite of genocidal intent. They contend that if the Haudenosaunee goal was to "make the enemy one of us" in order to replenish a declining population, then the Beaver Wars do not meet the "intent to destroy" required by most definitions of genocide. From this perspective, the Haudenosaunee's "destruction" of these nations was political, such as the end of the Wendat as a sovereign entity, rather than the biological and physical destruction of their people.

== Aftermath ==
In 1768, several of the Thirteen Colonies purchased the "Iroquois claim" to the Ohio and Illinois Country and created the Indiana Land Company to hold the claim to all of the Northwest. It maintained a claim to the region using the Haudenosaunee right of conquest until the company was dissolved in 1798 by the United States Supreme Court.

Many of the Haudenosaunee allied with the British during the American Revolutionary War, particularly warriors from the Mohawk, Cayuga, Onondaga and Seneca nations. These nations had longstanding trade relations with the British and hoped they might stop American encroachment on their lands. After the Americans emerged triumphant, the British parliament agreed to cede control over much of its territory in North America to the newly formed United States and worked to resettle American loyalists in Canada and provide some compensation for lands the Loyalists and Native Americans had lost to the United States. Mohawk leader Joseph Brant led a large group of Haudenosaunee out of New York to what became the reserve of the Six Nations of the Grand River in Ontario.

The coalition of Native American tribes, known as the Western Confederacy, was forced to cede extensive territory, including much of present-day Ohio, in the Treaty of Greenville in 1795.

New France's interactions with the Haudenosaunee and other Indigenous nations in the Great Lakes region greatly impacted the future of the French colony, as well as the Indigenous nations in the region. The French involvement in native trade caused the French to entangle with complex native alliances, which pitted tribes against the French, and each other. French involvement also introduced disease, weapons and warfare, which led to the further destruction of tribes in the region.

== See also ==
- American Indian Wars
- Colonial American military history
- Fox Wars
- Military history of Canada
- Military history of the Mi'kmaq people
- Military of New France
- List of genocides

== Sources ==
- Funk, Arville (1964). A Sketchbook of Indiana History. Christian Book Press.
- Hine, Robert V.; Faragher, John Mack (2000). The American West: A New Interpretive History. Yale University Press. ISBN 0-300-07835-8.
- Lupold, Harry Forrest; Haddad, Gladys (1988). Ohio's Western Reserve. Kent State University Press. ISBN 0-87338-372-9.
- Johansen, Bruce E. (2006). The Native Peoples of North America. Rutgers University Press. ISBN 0-8135-3899-8.
- Morgan, Lewis H. (1922). League of the Iroquois. Classic Textbooks. ISBN 1404751602.
- Schmalz, Peter S. (1991). The Ojibwa of Southern Ontario. University of Toronto Press. ISBN 0-8020-2736-9.
- Salvucci, Claudio R.; Schiavo, Anthony P. Jr. (2003). Iroquois Wars II: Excerpts from the Jesuit Relations and Other Primary Sources. Bristol, Pennsylvania: Evolution Publishing. ISBN 1-889758-34-5.
- Sciavo, Anthony P. Jr.; Salvucci, Claudio R. (2003). Iroquois Wars I: Excerpts from the Jesuit Relations and Primary Sources 1535–1650. Bristol, Pennsylvania: Evolution Publishing. ISBN 1-889758-37-X.
- Thompson, Maurice (1898). Stories of Indiana. New York, Cincinnati, Chicago: American Book Company.
