= Raymond Blaise Des Bergères de Rigauville =

French soldier (1655–1711)

Raymond Blaise Des Bergères de Rigauville (1655 – 21 July 1711) was a French soldier who became a part of the history of New France.

Blaise Des Bergères was a captain in the colonial regular troops when he came to Canada in 1685 with his young son Nicolas. They arrived with the new governor, Brisay de Denonville who was charged with controlling the Indians and the territory belonging to France. Raymond played a significant role in that endeavour. He was the commandant of three French forts, namely; Fort Niagara, Fort Frontenac and Fort Chambly. He was also the first appointment to the post of king's lieutenant at Trois-Rivières.
