= Jacques de Lamberville =

Jesuit missionary (1641-1710)

Jacques de Lamberville (1641 – 18 April 1710?) was a Jesuit missionary and the younger brother of Jean de Lamberville, also a missionary. He came to New France from France at the age of 34 and became part of the Iroquois missions. There, his most famous convert was Kateri Tekakwitha.

== Life ==
Jacques de Lamberville was born at Rouen in 1641. He joined the Society of Jesus in 1661, and taught at a number of colleges in France. In 1675 he proceeded to Canada and labored almost uninterruptedly on the Iroquois missions until his death. He instructed and baptized the Algonquin captive, Catherine Tegakwitha. Her family opposed her conversion. Eventually, with the help Lamberville and a letter of introduction, she and other converted Mohawks travelled to reach the St. Francis Xavier Mission at Sault St. Louis across from Montreal. Although he spent a year with his brother Jean among the Onondagas. Jacques worked principally among the Mohawks from 1675 to 1678; and then among the Onondagas until 1686.

During Governor Denonville's campaign against the Seneca in 1687, Lamberville served as chaplain to the garrison at Fort Cataracoui. His brother was there as well, since after Denonville's betrayal of the Iroquois sachems it became impossible for the priests to continue to work at the missions. Jean Lamberville occasionally travelled to Fort Conti at the mouth of the Niagara River. Jacques was appointed to teach at the Jesuit college in Quebec. In 1689 he was among the Mohawk at Sault-Saint-Louis, and in 1692 he was at Montreal.

Like his elder brother, he lived among the Iroquois during a period when the rivalry of the French and English to secure the alliance of that nation endangered the lives of the missionaries. His brother having returned to France due to poor health, in 1701, the sixty year old Lamberville returned to the mission among the Onondaga at their request, only to leave in 1709 through the intrigues of Abraham Schuyler, who instigated drunken Indians to burn the chapel and the priest's residence while Lamberville was away on a trip to Montreal. He then went to Cayuga, but in 1709 when war broke out, he went to Montreal, where he took on the management of the Hôtel-Dieu de Montréal.

Charlevoix says he was "one of the holiest missionaries of New France".

Lamberville died in Montreal 1710.
