= Jean de Lamberville =

Jesuit priest (1633–1714)

Jean de Lamberville (27 December 1633 – 10 February 1714) was a Jesuit priest who arrived in New France from France in 1669. He was the older brother of Jacques de Lamberville. Jean became a missionary to the Onondagas and had success in converting their chief, Garakontie. He also was well known for his knowledge in the medical treatments of his time.

== Life ==
Jean de Lamberville was born in Rouen on 27 December 1633. He entered the Jesuit novitiate in Paris on 3 March 1656. He sailed for New France in 1667 and was assigned to the missions. In 1672 he was sent to the mission of Saint-Jean-Baptiste at Onondaga to replace Pierre Millet, who had been transferred to the Mission of Francis Xavier at Oneida.

In 1677, Lamberville was appointed superior of the missions among the Five Nations. He maintained distant but cordial relations with the Dutch and English traders to the south, even on returning a stolen gun and powder box to Jeremiah Van Rensselaer, although he declined to return a runaway slave to Albany.

Governor Daniel de Rémy de Courcelle instructed René-Robert Cavelier, Sieur de La Salle to identify a location for the construction of a fort, which would also serve as a location for trade with the Iroquois. De La Salle, who, like Lamberville, was also from Rouen, consulted the priest. The fort, at the mouth of the Cataraqui River, was built in 1673 under Governor Louis de Buade de Frontenac and was later called Fort Frontenac.

In 1686 Governor Denonville asked Lamberville to persuade the Iroquois chiefs to come to Fort Frontenac for a parley. Denonville made a similar request to Pierre Millet, whom he asked to serve as interpreter. The Iroquois sachems had been lulled into meeting under a flag of truce. Denonville had them seized, chained, and shipped off to Marseille, France, to serve in the galley fleet. This made it impossible for the missionaries to return to the Iroquois.

Lamberville received word of this from some English traders at Onondaga, who urged the priest to return with them to the safety of New York, where Governor Dongan, would arrange passage to France. However, Lamberville proceeded to the fort, where he was able to effect the release of several of those captured. While Denonville pursued his campaign against the Seneca, Lamberville remained as chaplain at Frontenac, where he and a good part of the garrison came down with scurvy. He sometimes visited Fort Denonville, which the governor had built on the site of De La Salle's Fort Conti on the eastern bank of the Niagara River at its mouth, on Lake Ontario. By 1687, Lamberville was so ill he had to be removed to Montreal. He had spent fourteen years with the Onondaga Iroquois.

At Montreal, when the Onondagas and Mohawks harassed French allies, Lamberville consented to negotiate peace. His wise diplomacy obtained a mitigation of the humiliating terms proposed at Governor Dongan's instigation, and Denonville duly praised his ability

His health shattered, Lamberville's superior's sent him back to France as procurator of the Canadian mission. He died in Paris on 10 February 1714 at the age of 81. The Menology of the Society says that "he had the spiritual physiognomy of Brébeuf."
