= Nicolas Blaise Des Bergères de Rigauville =

French colonial officer (1679–1739)

Nicolas Blaise Des Bergères de Rigauville (1679 – July 1739) was an officer in the colonial regular troops of New France He was the commandant of Fort Niagara for a time and became the seigneur of two seigneuries through marriage.

Nicolas Blaise Des Bergères was involved in the military life of New France from the time of his arrival at age 6 and was an able student of his father, Raymond Blaise Des Bergères de Rigauville, and the military life in general. As an adult, he had a strong career in the military with his efforts as commandant of Fort Niagara being the most consistent.

Nicolas and his wife resided at one seigneury. Berthier-en-bas and sold the other, Berthier-en-Haut. The couple had nine children, two of whom achieved notability in Canadian history. Jean-Baptiste-Marie was one of the early Canadians named to the Legislative Council of Lower Canada. Charles-Régis became a priest and was elected canon of Quebec.
