= Pierre Millet =

French Jesuit missionary (1635–1708)

Pierre Millet (Milet) (19 November, 1635 at Bourges – December 31, 1708 at Quebec) was a French Jesuit missionary to the Haudenosaunee people in the area that is now New York State.

== Life ==
Having graduated Master of Arts, he entered the Society of Jesus at Paris on 3 October 1655, studied philosophy at La Fleche (1657-58), taught various classes there (1658–61) and at Compiegne (1661-63), and then returned to La Fleche for a second year of philosophy (1663-64). He then had a four-year course in theology at the College of Louis-le-Grand in Paris (1664-68).

Millet was ordained in 1668, and sent from to Canada with a number of missionaries. He was assigned to the Mission of St. John the Baptist at Onondaga. They called him Teahronhiagannra, that is "The Looker-up to Heaven". In 1671 he made his solemn profession as a Jesuit. Millet served among the Onondaga from 1668 to 1672, at which time he was put in charge of the Mission of St. Francis Xavier at Oneida. Jean de Lamberville succeeded Millet at Onondaga.

By 1675 had converted the primary Oneida chief to Christianity, allowing him to build a sizeable congregation. In February 1684, the Seneca plundered a number of French traders. Millet participated in a Haudenosaunee council and was sent, with Father Jacques de Lamberville, to treat with Governor Joseph-Antoine de La Barre.

The following year, he was sent with Governor Jacques-René de Brisay de Denonville, to act as interpreter at the Grand Council of Peace to be held at Fort Frontenac. Both he and the other missionaries were duped by the governor and used to lure the Haudenosaunee into the pitfall prepared for them. Denonville set out with a well-organized force to Fort Frontenac, where they met with the fifty sachems of the Haudenosaunee Confederacy from their Onondaga council fire. These fifty chiefs constituted the entire decision-making strata of the Haudenosaunee. They had been lulled into meeting under a flag of truce. Denonville seized, chained, and shipped the Haudenosaunee chiefs to Marseilles, France, to be used as galley slaves. This made it impossible for the missionaries to return to the Haudenosaunee.

Millet remained at Fort Frontenac as chaplain until in 1688 he was sent to replace Lamberville at Fort Niagara. When it was abandoned by the French later that year, he returned to Fort Frontenac where he continued his work as an interpreter and liaison between the French and Haudenosaunee.

Fort Frontenac was attacked by Haudenosaunee forces in 1689, and the Indians requested Millet's presence among their dying men. Members of the Onondaga tribe captured him and eventually turned him over to the Oneidas, who gave him the name Genherontatie, i.e., "The Dead (or Dying) Man who walks". He was about to be executed when he was adopted by an Indian woman, who gave him shelter until he was released in October, 1694, and went to Quebec. John Gilmary Shea notes that Millet's influence among the Oneida was such that the English worked to have him released, while the French wanted him to remain there. In 1697, a band of Oneidas came to live at Montreal and requested that he be assigned as a missionary.

In 1700, Millet wrote at least once to Rome (10 August 1700) a mild and submissive complaint that he had not yet obtained the favour of returning to the Haudenosaunee. He asked for prayers of the Society for Tarsha the chief and Suzanne his sister at Oneida, both of whom had acted as hosts to Millet during his captivity. Millet spent his last years at Quebec.

In 1705, he is described as under treatment for ill health. He lingered on for three years more but, on the last day of 1708, he died.

In 1926 the Knights of Columbus dedicated a cross in his honor at Fort Niagara.

== See also ==
- Julien Garnier
- Father Millet Cross

== Sources ==
- Francis Whiting Halsey: Jesuits and Church of England Men
