= Father Millet Cross =

American monument in New York

Coordinates: 43°15′48.7″N 79°3′46.7″W

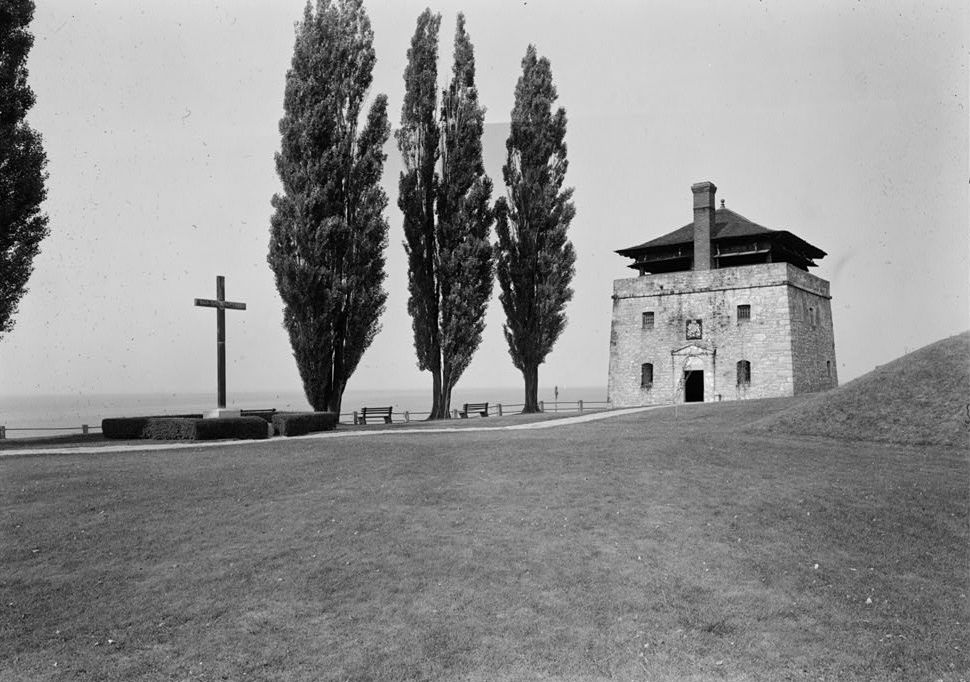
Father Millet Cross and North Redoubt, 1967

The Father Millet Cross is a memorial on the grounds of Fort Niagara in Youngstown, New York. The 18-foot (5.5 m) bronze cross is a replacement for the wooden cross erected by Pierre Millet at the New French Fort Denonville in 1688. During the preceding winter, disease and starvation overwhelmed the fort's garrison of a hundred men and only twelve of them were saved by a rescue party. Father Millet, a Jesuit missionary, was with this rescue party. On Good Friday (April 16) he celebrated Mass and erected and dedicated a cross invoking God's mercy for the plague-stricken men. On the beam of the cross is inscribed: "REGN. VINC. IMP. CHRS." an abbreviation for Regnat, Vincit, Imperat, Christus which is Latin for Christ reigns, conquers, and commands.

On September 5, 1925, Calvin Coolidge set aside an 18-foot square section (324 ft², 30.1 m², or 0.0074 acres) of Fort Niagara Military Reservation "for the erection of another cross commemorative of the cross erected and blessed by Father Millett [sic]." It was the smallest-ever national monument in the United States. In 1926 the New York State Knights of Columbus dedicated the memorial cross "not only to Father Millet but to those other priests whose heroism took Christianity into the wilderness and whose devotion sought to create in this new world a new France." It stands on the shore of Lake Ontario just west of the fort's north redoubt.

Father Millet Cross National Monument was originally administered by the War Department but was transferred to the National Park Service in 1933 by executive order. In 1945, Fort Niagara was declared surplus by the U.S. Army and plans were laid to convert the site to a state park. On September 7, 1949, Congress abolished the national monument and transferred the memorial to the state of New York for public use as part of Fort Niagara State Park.
