= Fort Niagara State Park =

State park in Porter, New York, US

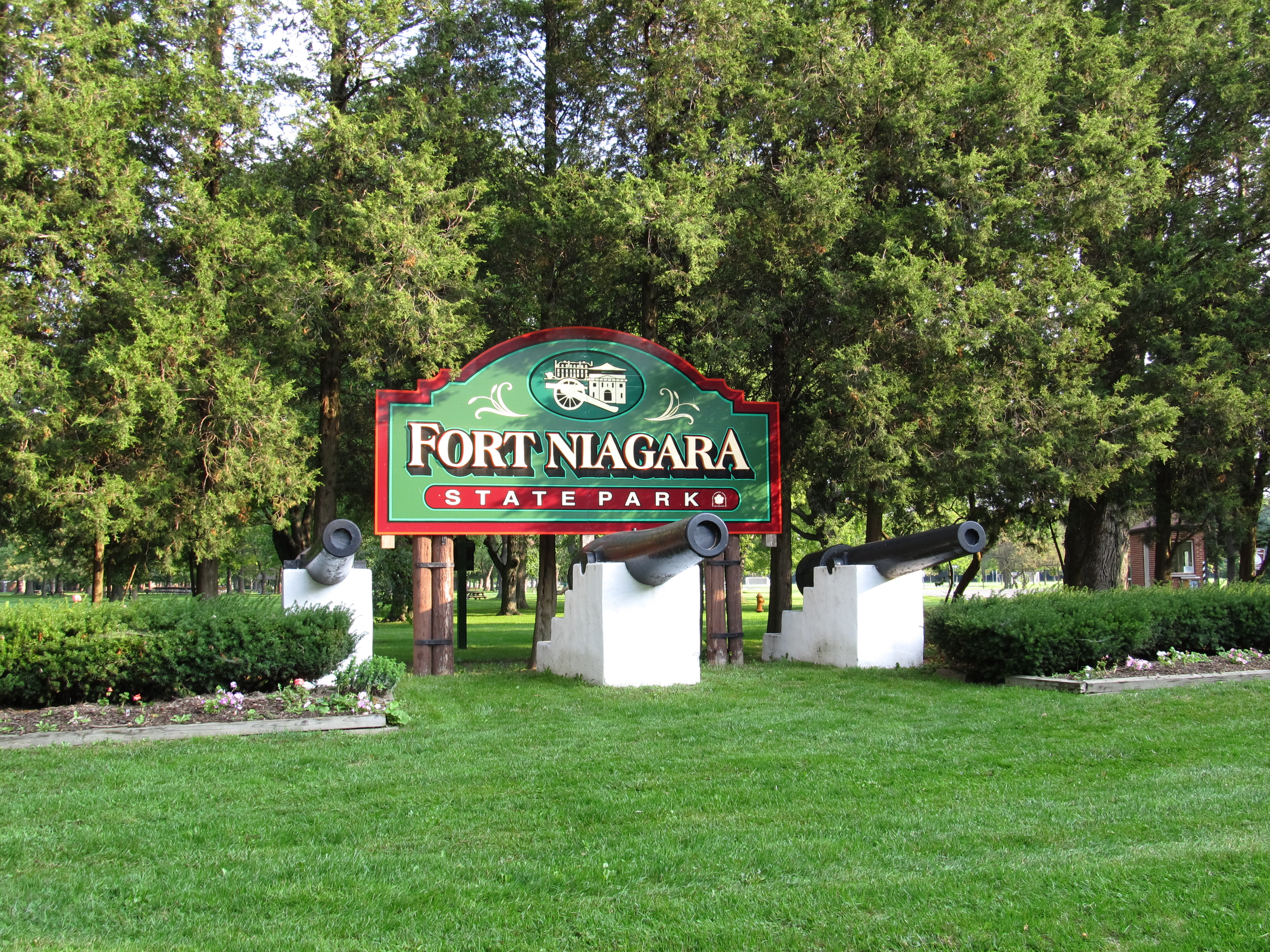
- Fort Niagara State Park

- Location within New York
- Type: State park
- Location: Route 18F; Youngstown, New York
- Coordinates: 43°15′43″N 79°03′18″W
- Area: 504 acres (2.04 km^{2})
- Created: February 1948
- Operator: New York State Office of Parks, Recreation and Historic Preservation
- Visitors: 830,538 (in 2014)
- Open: All year
- Website: Fort Niagara State Park

Fort Niagara State Park is located in the Town of Porter in Niagara County, New York, United States. Historic Fort Niagara is located within the park. The 504-acre (2.04 km^{2}) park is northwest of Youngstown near the northern terminus of the Niagara Scenic Parkway and is in the Niagara Falls National Heritage Area.

== History ==
A brief history of the area now known as Fort Niagara State Park.

- 1678: Fort Conti is built by French explorers (which burned to the ground less than a year later)
- 1687: Fort Denonville on the former site of Fort Conti
- 1726: The French built the two-story “Maison a Machicoulis” (referred to today as the “French Castle”).
- 1893: A US Coast Guard Station was established on the bank of the Niagara below the Fort which is still in service today
- 1938: The Officer’s Club building opens, replacing the original structure that was destroyed by fire. The design is inspired by the French Castle in the Old Fort
- 1940–1943: The 28th Infantry Regiment was moved south to train and Fort Niagara then served as a reception center for new recruits
- 1941: The Fort was granted from the State of New York to the United States.
- 1944–1946: Fort Niagara served as a camp for German prisoners of war
- 1948: Land transferred to the jurisdiction of the New York State Council of Parks to be managed as a state park.
- 1965–1966: The garrison buildings were demolished; of the 100 buildings on the base, most were demolished.

== Amenities ==
The park offers picnic tables and pavilions, hiking, a playground and 18 soccer fields, a pool, recreation programs, a nature trail, tennis, sledding, snowshoe trails, cross-country skiing, waterfowl hunting in season, fishing and a food concession. There are two boat launches on the lower Niagara River. The park includes the Old Fort Niagara Historic Site. Tom Loftin Johnson painted five murals at The Officer's Club which commemorate the history of the 28th regiment from its founding in 1905.

During the summer, a state park naturalist provides nature programs, trail hikes and manages the natural history exhibits in the park's nature center.

The skyline of Toronto, 30 miles (48 km) to the north, is visible across Lake Ontario from the park on days with clear weather. The tops of the CN Tower and other skyscrapers can be seen, though the Canadian shore itself is hidden below the horizon.

== 1872 lighthouse ==
The current lighthouse in Fort Niagara State Park, constructed in 1872, is the third to be built at Fort Niagara. It was constructed by the United States government after the previous wooden one was damaged by a tornado. It is an octagonal limestone tower featuring a storage room at the base, that used to hold oil. The Fresnel lens from the old tower was used and the tower was lit for the first time on June 10, 1872.

In 1900 the tower was raised an additional 11 feet (3.4 m) when a watch room was added between the lamp and the limestone tower. Lifting the lamp extended the reach of the light to 25 miles (40 km). Adjacent to the lighthouse is the keeper's quarters which is a colonial-style home that now serves as a private residence.

The U.S. Coast Guard ran the light until 1993, when nearby tree overgrowth began to inhibit the light's visibility from the Niagara River and Lake Ontario. A modern steel beacon tower was erected near the Coast Guard station and the Old Fort Niagara Association runs the 1872 tower as a museum and gift shop. The original Fresnel lens is now on display in the Fort's museum.

== Recent events ==
In 2015, as part of Governor Cuomo and New York State's plan to invest $72 million in their state parks, $2,500,000 was pledged to modernize the bathhouses at Fort Niagara's swimming areas. Additionally, Fort Niagara will share $600,000 across Artpark, Four Mile Creek State Park, Golden Hill State Park and Wilson-Tuscarora State Park for fishing docks and related fishing access projects.

== See also ==
- List of New York state parks
