= Denonville =

- Commune
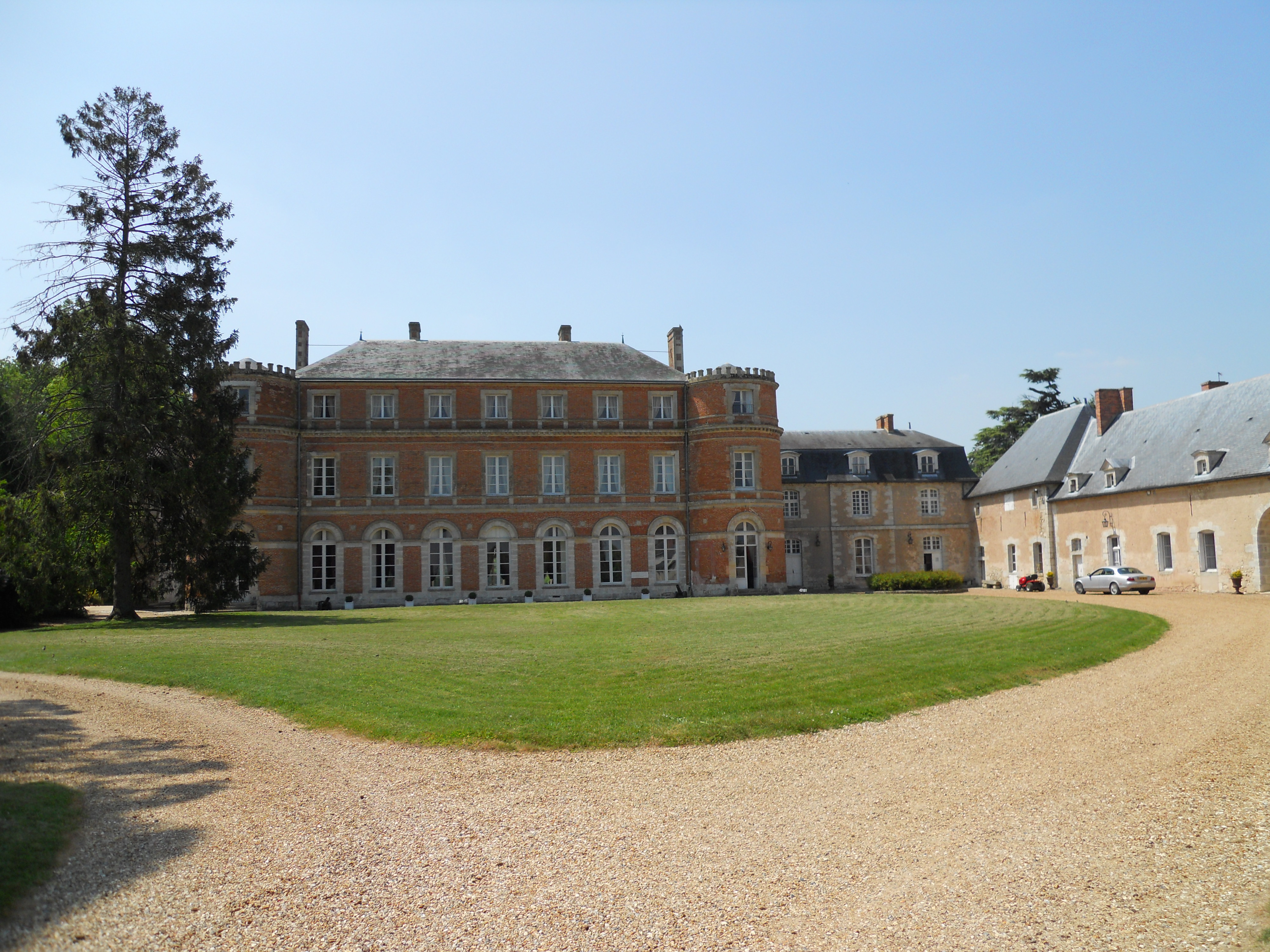
- Chateau

- Coat of arms
- Location of Denonville
- Location within France Location within Centre-Val de Loire
- Coordinates: 48°23′35″N 1°48′44″E
- Country: France
- Region: Centre-Val de Loire
- Department: Eure-et-Loir
- Arrondissement: Chartres
- Canton: Auneau
- Intercommunality: CA Chartres Métropole

Government
  - Mayor (2020–2026): Evelyne Lagoutte
- Area^{1}: 12.82 km^{2} (4.95 sq mi)
- Elevation: 148 m (486 ft)
- Highest elevation: 155 m (509 ft)
- Lowest elevation: 142 m (466 ft)
- Population (2023): 798
  - Density: 62.2/km^{2} (161/sq mi)
- Time zone: UTC+01:00 (CET)
  - Summer (DST): UTC+02:00 (CEST)
- INSEE/Postal code: 28129 /28700
- ^{1} French Land Register data, which excludes lakes, ponds, glaciers > 1 km^{2} (0.386 sq mi or 247 acres) and river estuaries.

Denonville (French pronunciation: [dənɔ̃vil]) is a commune in the Eure-et-Loir department in northern France.

== Population ==
Historical population
Year	Pop.	±% p.a.
1968	344	—
1975	349	+0.21%
1982	374	+0.99%
1990	607	+6.24%
1999	672	+1.14%
2007	791	+2.06%
2012	750	−1.06%
2017	759	+0.24%
2023	798	+0.84%
Source: INSEE

== See also ==
- Jacques-René de Brisay, Marquis de Denonville
- Communes of the Eure-et-Loir department
