= Fort Denonville =

1688 French fort

Coordinates: 43°15′46″N 79°03′47″W

- Niagara River
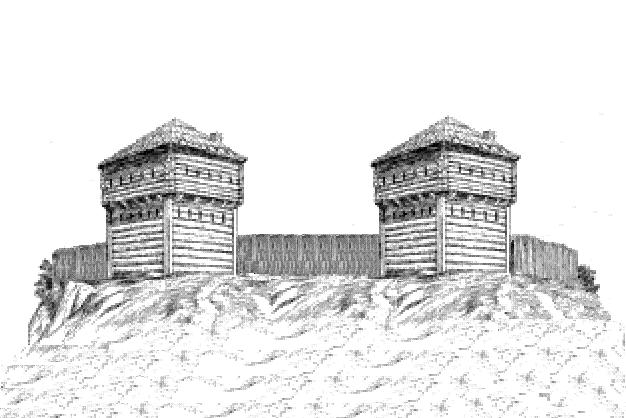

Site information
- Controlled by: New France

Site history
- Built: 1687
- In use: Abandoned

Fort Denonville was a French fort built in 1688 at the current site of Fort Niagara. It replaced Fort Conti which had been built on the site in 1679 and had burned later that year.

The fort was located at the mouth of the Niagara River on Lake Ontario.

== History ==
In the summer of 1687 the Governor of New France, Jacques-René de Brisay, Marquis de Denonville, was on a military expedition to pacify the Iroquois. Nearing the end of the campaign season the governor, wishing to keep French presence in the area, moved his army to the site and constructed a post and named it after himself. The fort, which comprised eight wooden buildings and a stockade, was garrisoned by one hundred men and commanded by Captain Pierre de Troyes, Chevalier de Troyes. The governor and the rest of the force returned to Montreal for the winter. The Seneca, in reprisal for Denonville's attack of 1687, laid siege to the fort and denied the garrison the benefits of forage or fresh air. Eighty-nine of the garrison died of scurvy, disease, and starvation during the siege. On Good Friday of 1688 a relief force returned and found twelve survivors. The chaplain of the relief force, Jesuit Father Pierre Millet, erected a cross and gave a mass of thanksgiving for their survival. The fort was re-garrisoned, but in September 1688 the French would pull down the stockade and would not winter there again until 1726 when "The House of Peace" (today known as the French Castle) and Fort Niagara were built on the same site.
