= Niagara Falls National Heritage Area =

United States National Heritage Area in New York

Coordinates: 43.1098°N 79.0549°W

- Interactive map of Niagara Falls National Heritage Area
- Location: Niagara Falls, New York, United States
- Established: 2008
- Website: www.nps.gov/places/niagara-falls-national-heritage-area.htm

Niagara Falls National Heritage Area is a federally designated National Heritage Area encompassing the Niagara Falls region of the U.S. State of New York. The heritage area includes the communities of Niagara Falls, Youngstown and Lewiston. The designation provides a framework for the promotion and interpretation of the area's cultural and historic character, and the preservation of the natural and built environment. The heritage area designation recognizes the area's importance to Native Americans, to early European explorers of America, the American Revolution, the War of 1812 and the area's role in the Underground Railroad. The area also recognizes the contribution of the Niagara Falls region to the industrialization of the United States, as well as the development of Niagara Falls as a protected natural area.

Significant landmarks within the heritage area include the Adams Power Plant Transformer House, the Niagara Reservation, and the Colonial Niagara Historic District, all National Historic Landmarks. The Adams Power Plant was the first large alternating current generating station in the world. The Niagara Reservation, designed by Frederick Law Olmsted, was the first state park in the United States. The Colonial Niagara Historic District includes Fort Niagara, which has seen a military presence from 1678 to the present day.

A newer attraction within the heritage area is the Niagara Falls Underground Railroad Heritage Center which is operated jointly by the heritage area and the Niagara Falls Underground Railroad Heritage Commission.

Niagara Falls National Heritage Area was authorized by the Consolidated Natural Resources Act of 2008 of August, 2008. It establishes a commission of state and local agencies, Congressional nominees, nominees of the cities of Niagara Falls, Youngstown and Lewiston, and representatives of the Seneca and Tuscarora nations.
