= Fort Conti =

Demolished fort near Lake Ontario

Coordinates: 43°15′46″N 79°03′47″W

Fort Conti was built in early 1679 at the mouth of the Niagara River on Lake Ontario as a post for the French explorer René-Robert Cavelier, Sieur de La Salle. Because of the fort's location, the French hoped to control the fur trade in the lower Great Lakes. The fort was named after Louis Armand I, Prince of Conti, the patron of La Salle's lieutenant, Henri de Tonti.

The storehouse and stockade were used as a shifting point for ships coming from Fort Frontenac (modern day Kingston, Ontario); the supplies would then be further shipped by canoes or bateaux up the river to current day Lewiston, New York, portaged up the Niagara Escarpment and carried past Niagara Falls to a place where the swift currents would not endanger the supplies, craft or crew. At this place, believed to be somewhere around current-day La Salle, New York (part of the city of Niagara Falls, New York, local historians place the site on Cayuga Island in Jayne Park.)

La Salle built a larger boat (most likely a reassembled boat taken apart at Fort Conti), and christened it Le Griffon and used her for the exploration of the river and Lake Erie in his search for a passage to the East Indies. In the summer of 1679 the fort was garrisoned by a handful of men while La Salle explored the upper lakes; The men returned to Fort Frontenac saying it was burned by "Indian raiders"; probably a cover to escape a brutal windswept winter on the shores of Ontario. The story is unlikely because natives in the area did not begin to become hostile until a few years later. Nonetheless the fort burned in late 1679, and was never rebuilt. Later the site would serve the French as Fort Denonville, which failed after less than a year, and later as the more permanent Fort Niagara which still stands today.

The site is now operated by a not-for-profit corporation within Fort Niagara State Park in the town of Porter, just north of Youngstown, New York.
