= Jacques-René de Brisay, Marquis de Denonville =

17th-century French soldier

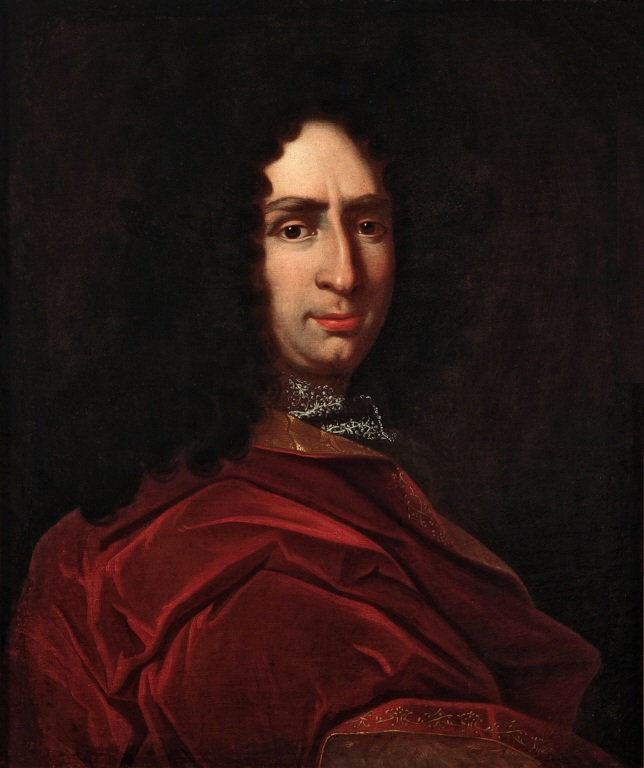
- Born: 10 December 1637; Denonville (Eure-et-Loir), France
- Died: 22 September 1710 (aged 72); Denonville (Eure-et-Loir), France
- Occupation: Governor General of New France

Signature
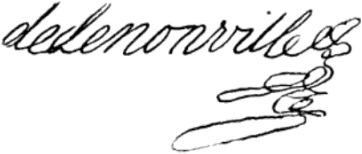

Jacques-René de Brisay, Marquis de Denonville (French pronunciation: [ʒak ʁəne də bʁizɛ maʁki də dənɔ̃vil]; 10 December 1637 – 22 September 1710) was the Governor General of New France from 1685 to 1689 and was an important figure during the intermittent conflict between New France and the Haudenosaunee (Iroquois) known as the Beaver Wars.

Denonville replaced the unpopular Joseph-Antoine Le Fèbvre de La Barre who had led a failed expedition against the Haudenosaunee in 1684. Denonville's goals were to prevent any disruption of the lucrative fur trade by the English or Haudenosaunee, and dissuade the Haudenosaunee from raiding French settlements. In 1687, he led a punitive expedition against the Seneca that destroyed four of their villages. Denonville was recalled in 1689 because Louis XIV felt that the Marquis's military expertise would be of greater use in Europe.

== Early life ==
Jacques-René de Brisay was the seventh child and eldest son of Pierre de Brisay and Louise d’Alès de Corbet. Pierre and Louise were members of the minor nobility. Pierre's holdings included the seigneury of Denonville, 64 kilometres (40 mi) southwest of Paris. Jacques-René entered the army at an early age and inherited the title Marquis de Denonville when he reached his age of majority. He was commissioned a captain in the Régiment Royal and participated in the 1664 North African campaign against the Barbary pirates. He later served in the Netherlands as a captain in the Régiment de la reine dragons (Queen's Dragoons). In November 1668, Denonville married Catherine Courtin, daughter of Germain Courtin. He was commissioned lieutenant-colonel of the Queen's Dragoons on 1673, and colonel-lieutenant in 1675, and in 1683 was promoted to brigadier.

== Governor General of New France ==
For several decades, New France and its Indigenous allies had been the target of intermittent attacks by the five nations of the Haudenosaunee Confederacy. In response to Seneca attacks on France's fur trading partners in the Pays des Illinois, Denonville's predecessor as Governor General, Joseph-Antoine Le Fèbvre de La Barre, had led a poorly planned expedition that not only failed to curb Haudenosaunee aggression, but resulted in what Louis XIV called a "shameful peace." The king recalled La Barre, and appointed Denonville, an officer of proven ability, as his replacement.

Denonville arrived at Quebec aboard a merchant ship with his pregnant wife and two daughters on August 1, 1685. The Marquise de Denonville was safely delivered of a daughter a few weeks later. Ships carrying 500 soldiers of the Troupes de la Marine and 150 engagés began arriving towards the end of the month, however, 60 on the first ship had died of typhus or scurvy, while the rest were in ill-health.

Denonville actively recruited Canadians for the Troupes de la Marine to replace soldiers who had died. He received six blank commissions from France in order to enlist young men of "good" families for the officer corps. He established a navigation school at Quebec to train Canadians as maritime pilots, enacted strict regulations governing taverns, restricted the number of fur-trading licences, and ordered a palisade constructed around Ville-Marie. (Montreal).

Louis XIV had instructed Denonville to "remove the fear of the Iroquois menace by humbling their pride." Denonville recognized that the security of New France depended not only on curbing Haudenosaunee aggression but dealing with the threat of the Hudson's Bay Company to the fur trade. In March 1686, Denonville dispatched 30 French regulars under Pierre de Troyes and 70 Canadians under Pierre Le Moyne d'Iberville overland from Montreal to James Bay. De Troyes and d'Iberville exceeded their orders, capturing Moose Factory, Rupert House and Fort Albany, and seizing 50,000 beaver pelts.

In 1687, Denonville launched a well-organized campaign against the Seneca. The expedition consisted of 832 French regulars, over 900 Canadian militia, and some 400 Indigenous allies. They left Montreal on June 13, 1687, and ascended the St. Lawrence River in batteaux and canoes. The expedition reached the French fort at Cataraqui at the eastern end of Lake Ontario on July 1.

The "neutral" Oneida who lived at Cataraqui and at Ganneious on the Napanee River had several days earlier been taken captive to prevent news of the expedition from reaching the Seneca. Denonville ordered that the Cayuga who lived at Kempe on the Bay of Quinte should also be taken captive. 51 men and 150 women and children from the three villages became prisoners of the French.

Denonville departed Cataraqui on July 4. The force rendezvoused with a large group of Ottawa, Illinois and coureurs des bois, and landed at Irondequoit Bay on the south shore of Lake Ontario. They erected a palisade to protect the boats, and on July 12 began the march to the largest of the Seneca villages, Ganondagan. On the 13th they were ambushed by several hundred Seneca, but after a French counterattack the Seneca "soon resolved to fly." The expedition suffered 6 killed and 20 wounded, while the Seneca casualties were 45 killed and 60 wounded. Upon their arrival at the village, the French "found it burned" and a nearby fort abandoned. A large number of hogs were butchered, and hundreds of thousands of bushels of stored and standing maize were destroyed. The force then turned west and destroyed the village of Totiakton and two smaller villages before returning to their boats at Irondequoit.

Denonville sent the sick and wounded back to Cataraqui, then headed west along the south shore of Lake Ontario to the Niagara River where he constructed Fort Denonville. The site had previously been used by La Salle for Fort Conti from 1678 to 1679. Fort Denonville was abandoned the following year, however, the location was later used for Fort Niagara. Leaving behind a garrison of 100 men, Denonville proceeded back to Cataraqui, before returning to Montreal on August 13.

Following the orders of Louis XIV, Denonville reluctantly sent 36 of the male prisoners to France to serve as galley slaves. Jesuit missionary Father Jean de Lamberville later accused Denonville of luring 40 Haudenosaunee sachems to Cataraqui and enslaving them, however, the contemporary accounts written by Denonville, Louis Henri de Baugy, and Louis Armand, Baron de Lahontan record that the captives send to France were from the villages of Kente, Ganneoius, and Cataraqui, or had been among the small number taken prisoner as the expedition ascended the St. Lawrence River.

Due to the efforts of Denonville and the Minister of the Navy, Jean Baptise Colbert, Marquis de Seignelay, 13 captives returned to New France in October 1689. Denoville had asked Seignelay to "preserve the Iroquois in Marseille" in anticipation that their return would facilitate peace negotiations with the Haudenosaunee. In October 1688, Seignelay ordered that the surviving Haudenosaunee be sent to Rochefort and treated well, but only 13 of the original 36 captives survived their two-year captivity and returned to Quebec.

In June 1688 Denonville negotiated a peace settlement with the Haudenosaunee, however, his efforts were sabotaged the following year when England joined the coalition that had formed after France triggered the Nine Years' War. The English promptly informed their Haudenosaunee allies that a state of war existed, and in the early hours of August 5, 1689, the Mohawk attacked the settlement of Lachine west of Montreal. 24 inhabitants were killed and 56 houses destroyed in what is known as the Lachine massacre. As many as 90 inhabitants were taken prisoner, of whom 42 never returned. Smaller raids continued for several months forcing Denonville to order the abandonment of the Cataraqui fort.

Several months earlier, Louis XIV had signed the order for Denonville to return to France. The king explained to Denonville that he wanted "to employ you in my armies where I am persuaded that you will serve me with the same zeal and the same success as you have done in the past." Denonville's replacement, the former governor Louis de Buade de Frontenac arrived in October 1688.

== Later life ==
Denonville was promoted to Major General upon his return to France. In recognition of his decades of military service, Louis XIV appointed Denonville deputy-governor to the king's grandson, Louis, Duke of Burgandy. Denonville was subsequently appointed deputy-governor to Phillipe, Duke of Anjou in 1690, and Charles, Duke of Berry in 1693. Jacques-René de Brisay, Marquis de Denonville died at his chateau in Denonville, and was buried in the crypt of the chateau's chapel.

== Anniversary medal ==
Obverse of the Denonville medal

Reverse of the Denonville medal

A medal commemorating the 250th anniversary of the 1687 Denonville Expedition was created by the Rochester Numismatic Association in 1937. The obverse has an image of the Marquis de Denonville while the reverse shows the timeline and path of the expedition.

Government offices
| Preceded by Joseph-Antoine de La Barre | Governor General of New France; 1685 – 1689 | Succeeded by Louis de Buade de Frontenac |
