= Fort Niagara =

State historic site of New York, US

- U.S. National Register of Historic Places
- U.S. National Historic Landmark District
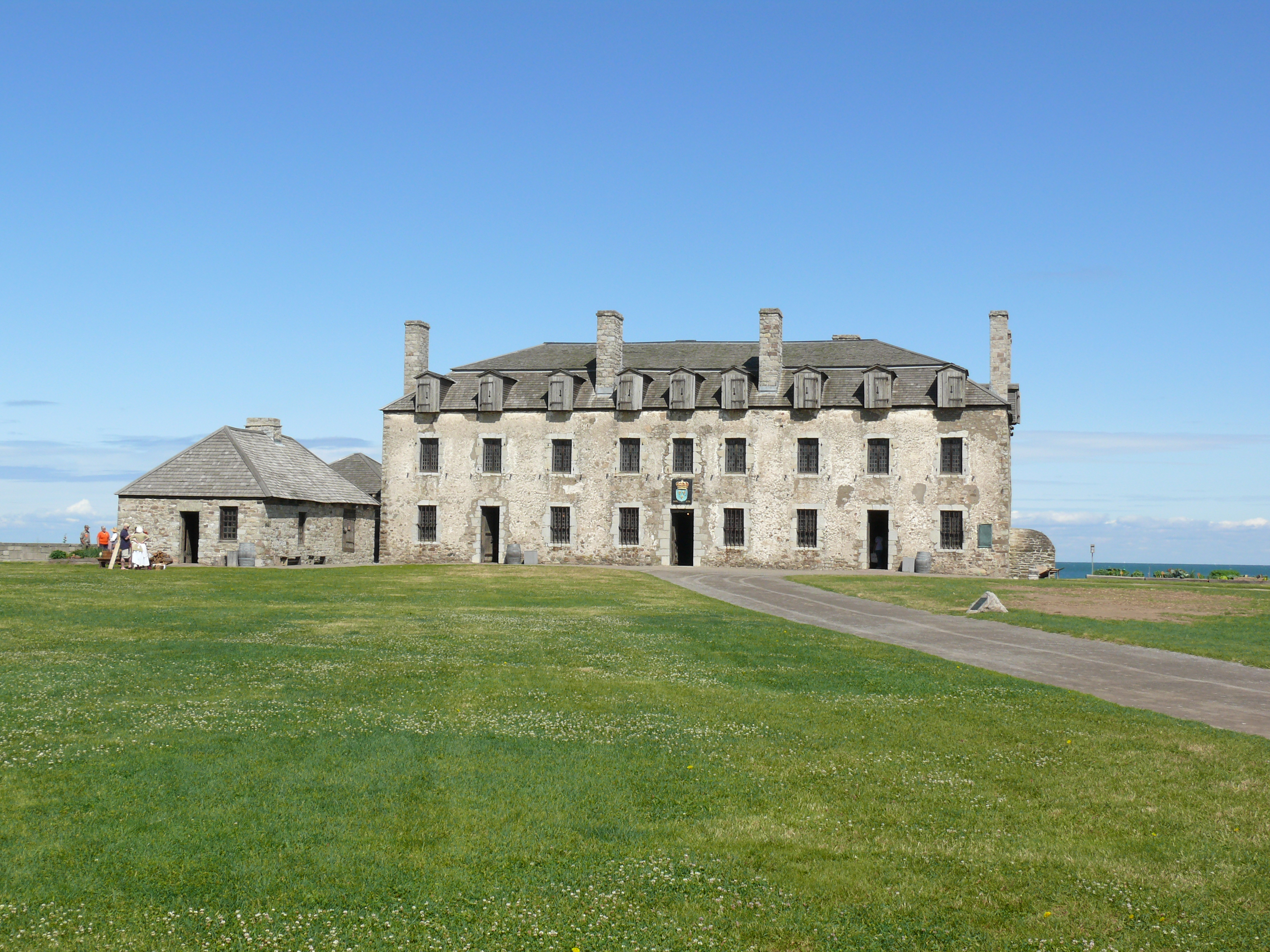
- View of French Castle at Fort Niagara
- Location: Fort Niagara State Park, Porter, Niagara County, New York, US
- Nearest city: Youngstown, New York
- Coordinates: 43°15′46″N 79°03′47″W
- Area: 250 acres (100 ha)
- Built: 1726
- NRHP reference No.: 66000556

Significant dates
- Added to NRHP: October 15, 1966
- Designated NHLD: October 9, 1960

Fort Niagara
- Youngstown, New York
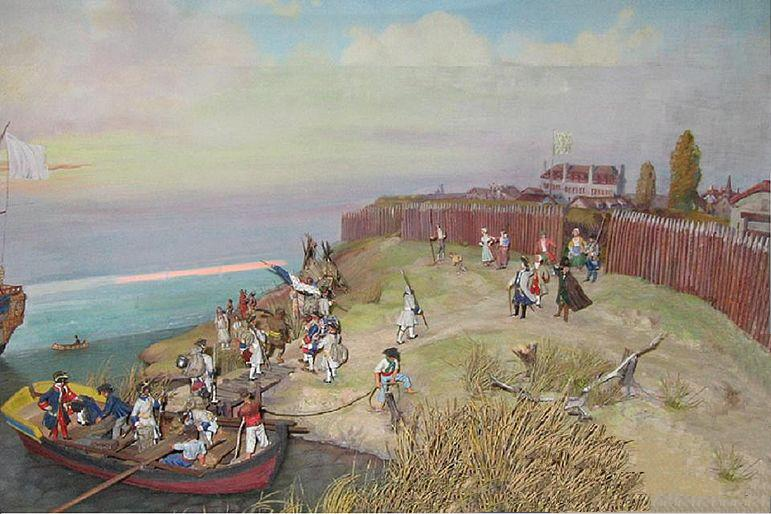
- Fort Niagara 1728

Site information
- Type: Trading Post
- Controlled by: France 1678–1759; Great Britain 1759–1796; U.S. Army 1815–1963; U.S. Coast Guard 1963–present

Site history
- Built: 1678
- In use: 1726–present
- Battles/wars: French and Indian War Pontiac's War Bradstreet's Expedition The War of 1812

Garrison information
- Past commanders: Louis-Thomas Chabert de Joncaire (1720–1726) John W. Heavey (1916–1917)

Fort Niagara, also known as Old Fort Niagara, is a fortification originally built by New France to protect its interests in North America, specifically control of access between the Niagara River and Lake Ontario, the easternmost of the Great Lakes. The fort is on the river's eastern bank at its mouth on Lake Ontario. Youngstown, New York, later developed nearby.

The British took over the fort in 1759 during the French and Indian War. Although the United States ostensibly was ceded the fort after it gained independence in the American Revolutionary War, the British stayed until 1796. Transfer to the U.S. came after signing of the Jay Treaty that reaffirmed and implemented the legal border with British Canada. Although the US Army deactivated the fort in 1963, the Coast Guard continues to have a presence. A non-profit group operates the fort and grounds as a state park and preserves it in part as a museum and site for historical re-enactments. It is also a venue for special events related to the region's history.

== Origin ==
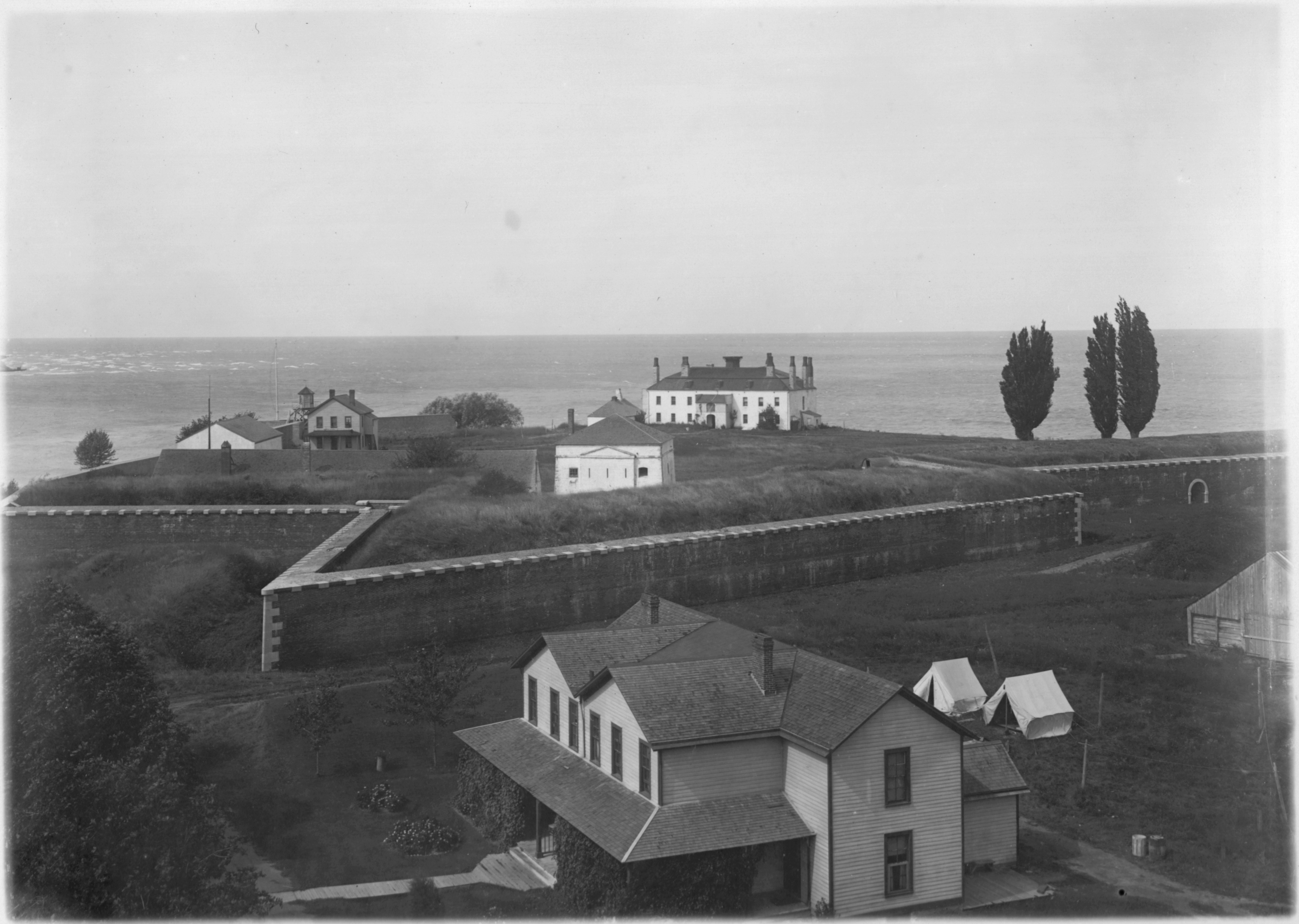
Overlooking Fort Niagara, c. 1915

René-Robert Cavelier, Sieur de La Salle, built the first fortified structure, called Fort Conti, in 1678. In 1687, the Governor of New France, the Marquis de Denonville, replaced it with a new fort. He named it Fort Denonville and posted a hundred men as a garrison under the command of Capt. Pierre de Troyes, Chevalier de Troyes. The winter weather and disease was severe, and all but twelve died by the time a relief force returned from Montreal. The government decided in September 1688 to abandon the post and had the stockade pulled down.

Louis-Thomas Chabert de Joncaire was dispatched to the Seneca people, one of the Five Nations of the Iroquois League, to obtain permission to build a French post on the banks of the river. He spoke to several chiefs in 1720, explaining his pleasure was always great when he visited them but that he would do it more spontaneously if he had a dwelling place. Considering that he was of the tribe since his turbulent captivity and his "adoption", the chiefs agreed he had the right to build a dwelling where they chose. Joncaire and eight men dispatched from Fort Frontenac built a trading post, called Magasin Royal or Maison de la Paix (Royal Store or House of Peace) on the right bank of the river (going downstream). The name was intended to emphasize the French peaceful intent, to exchange goods for furs here.

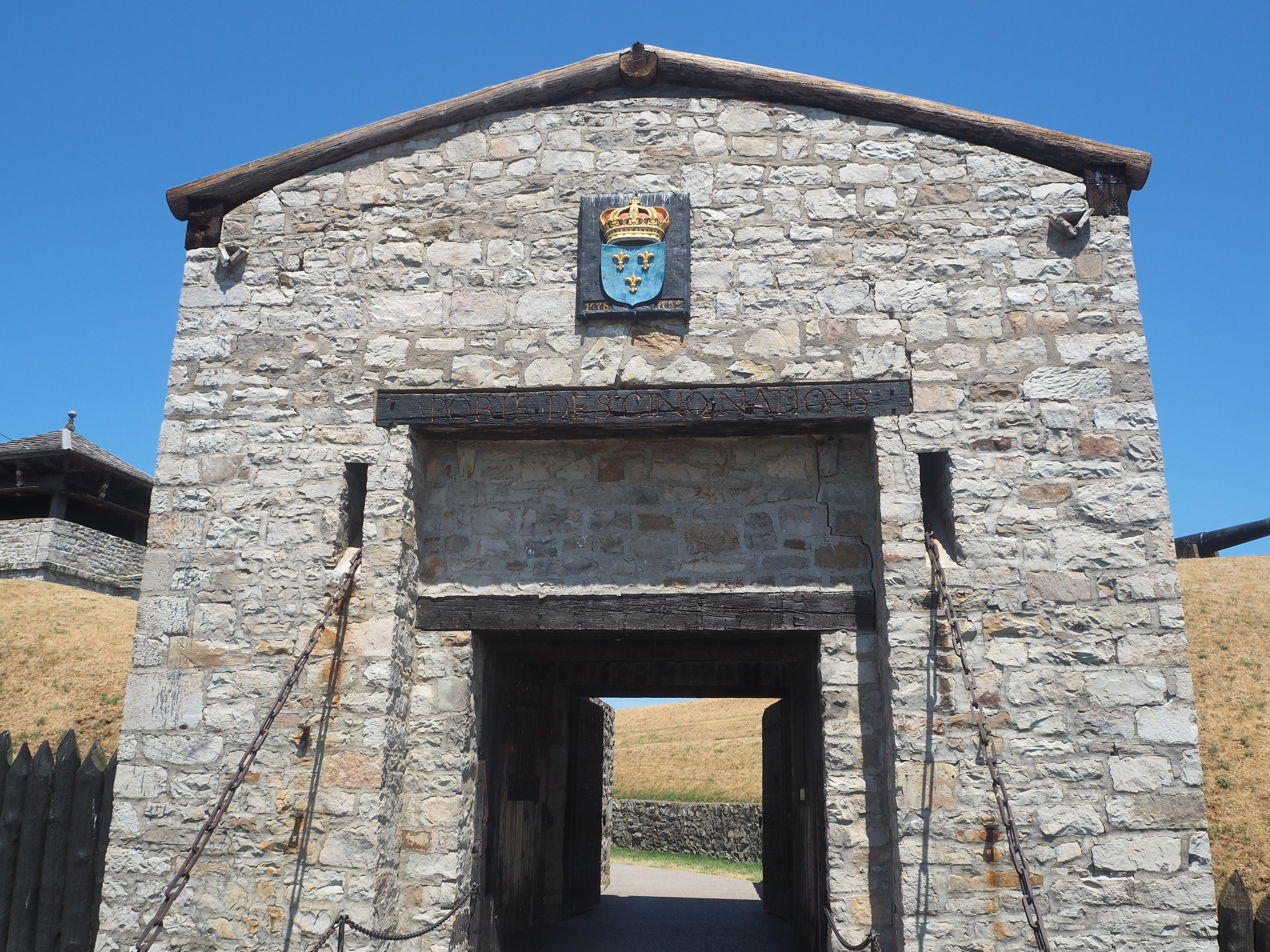
Porte des Cinq Nations. Beginning in 1756, the main entrance to Fort Niagara was established at the southern bastion, on the side of the Niagara River. The French named this gate the Porte des Cinq Nations, that is, the Gate of the Five Nations, in honor of the Iroquois League.

In 1726, French engineer Gaspard-Joseph Chaussegros de Léry built a two-story Maison à Machicoulis or "Machicolated House" on the site to replace the old fort. In 1755 the French expanded the fort to its present size in response to the armed confrontation that started between French and British colonial interests as part of the Seven Years' War in Europe. In North America, British colonists called this the French and Indian War; both sides cultivated Native American allies.

The name used today, "The French Castle", was not used until the 19th century.

== British and American control ==
The fort was a strategic site in the French and Indian War. It fell to the British after they conducted a nineteen-day siege in July 1759, which was called the Battle of Fort Niagara. The French relief force sent to relieve the besieged garrison was ambushed at the Battle of La Belle-Famille. The post's commander, Pierre Pouchot, surrendered the fort to the British commander, Sir William Johnson, who initially led the New York Militia. The Irish-born Johnson became the expedition's leader after General John Prideaux literally lost his head; he stepped in front of a mortar being test-fired during the siege. The British controlled the fort for the next thirty-seven years before they handed it over to the Americans after the Revolutionary War.

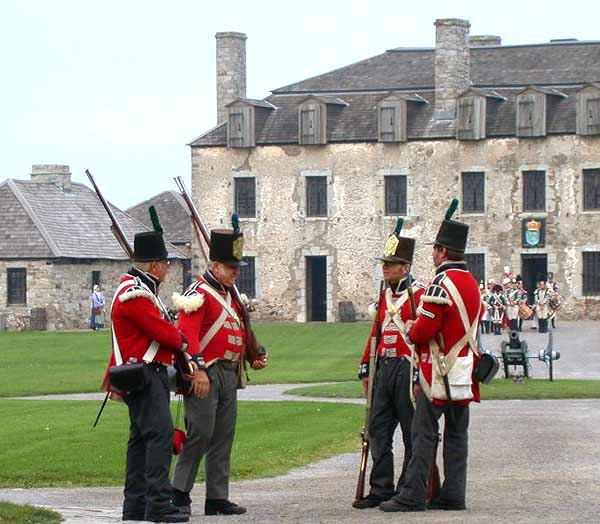
Reenactors dressed in British 1812 uniforms at Old Fort Niagara

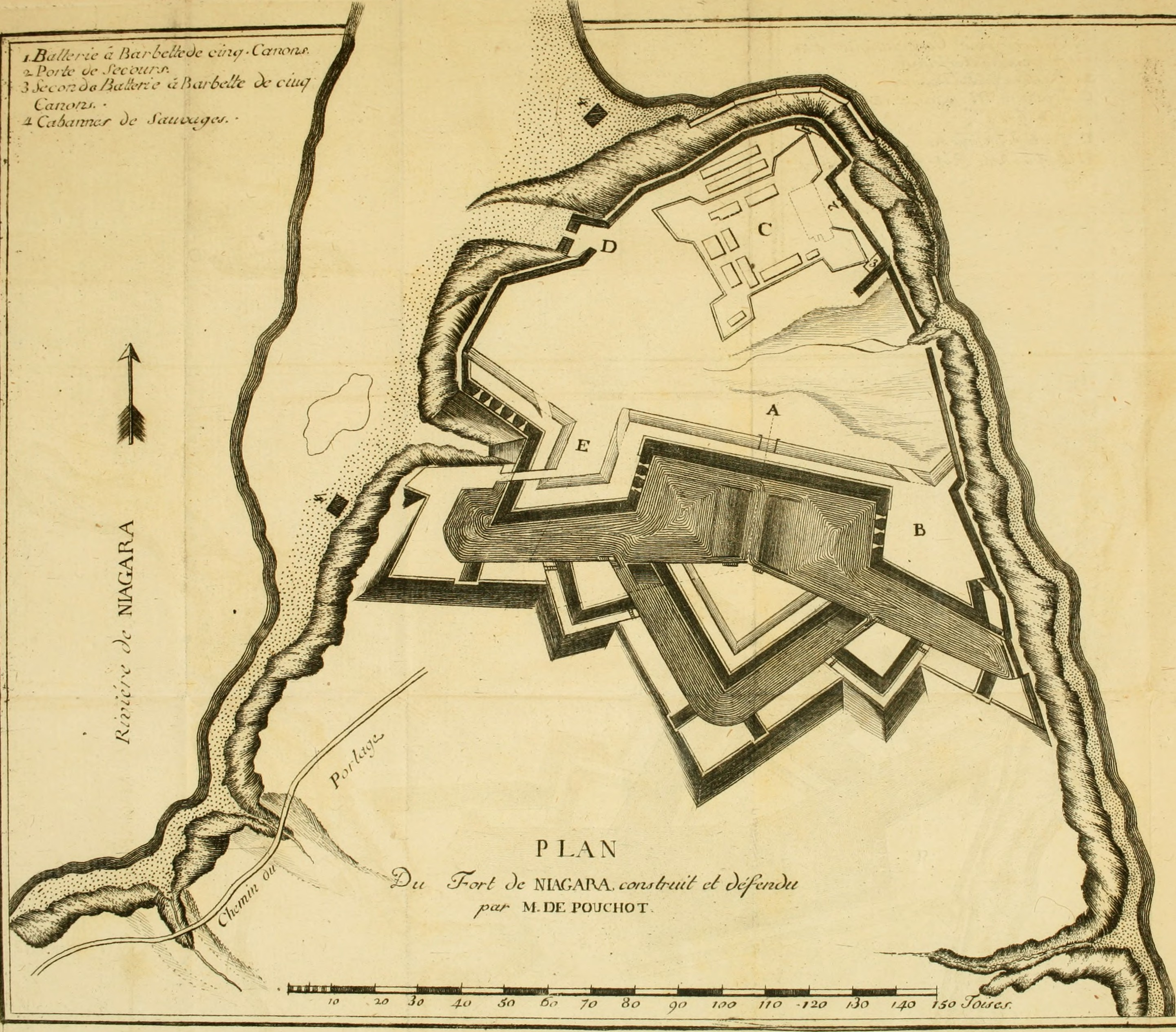
1781 map of Fort Niagara

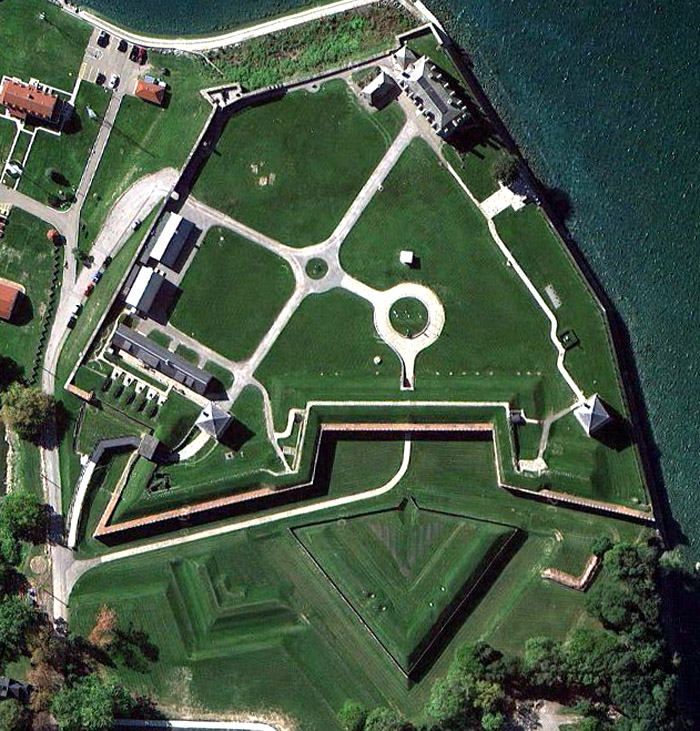
March 2013 view of Fort Niagara

Fort Niagara served as the Loyalist base in New York during the American Revolutionary War for Colonel John Butler and his Butler's Rangers, a provincial military unit. Lt. Col. William Stacy, a high-ranking officer of the Continental Army, was captured by Butler's Rangers in their attack on Cherry Valley, New York. He was held captive at Fort Niagara during the summer of 1779. Niagara became notorious for drinking, brawling, whoring, and cheating. Crude taverns, stores, and bordellos sprouted on "the Bottom", the riverside flat below the fort.

Though the British ceded Fort Niagara to the United States after the Treaty of Paris ended the American War of Independence in 1783, the region remained effectively under British control for thirteen years. Only after signing of the Jay Treaty did American forces occupy the fort in 1796. In the interim, United Empire Loyalists fleeing persecution in the new US were given land grants, typically 200 acres (81 ha) per inhabitant in Upper Canada, and some were partly sustained in the early years by aid from the fort's military stores.

During the War of 1812, the fort's guns sank the Provincial Marine schooner Seneca on November 21, 1812. British forces captured the fort on the night of December 19, 1813, in retaliation for the Americans' burning of Niagara, formerly called Newark, nine days earlier. Newark had been renamed Niagara in 1796. The British held the fort until they relinquished it under the terms of the Treaty of Ghent. It has remained in US custody ever since.

Nine currently active battalions of the Regular Army (4-1 FA, 1-2 Inf, 2-2 Inf, 1-3 Inf, 2-3 Inf, 4-3 Inf, 1-4 Inf, 2-4 Inf and 3-4 Inf) are derived from American units (Leonard's Company, 1st Regiment of Artillery, and the old 14th, 19th and 22nd Infantry Regiments) that were at Fort Niagara during the War of 1812. 52 (Niagara) Battery Royal Artillery (Holcroft's Company, 4th Battalion Royal Artillery), Royal Scots and a number of other British units that fought at the Capture of Fort Niagara still exist today. A number of other units that served in the Fort in the War of 1812 (such as 20 Battery Royal Artillery (Caddy's Company, 4th Battalion Royal Artillery)) also endure.

== Later use ==
The name "Old Fort Niagara" is associated with the fort today; it does not refer to its age but to distinguish the colonial-era fortress from its more modern namesake. In the post-Civil War era, the "New Fort Niagara" was built outside the original walls of the fort. The military abandoned the use of masonry forts in this era, having found that masonry fared poorly under bombardment. They built the new fort in the newer style of a military camp.

The new Fort Niagara had a 1,000-yard rifle range, access to rail lines, and access to the industrial areas of Niagara Falls and Buffalo, New York. Fort Niagara trained troops for the Spanish–American War. The United States was preparing for entry into World War I in June 1917, so the post began an officer training school which included Daniel W. Hand and Charles W. Ryder as instructors.

The fort was used between the wars as a Citizens' Military Training Camp.

During World War II, Fort Niagara was an induction center before it became a prisoner of war camp for 1,200 German soldiers captured in the North African Campaign. After the war, the fort provided temporary housing for returning veterans.

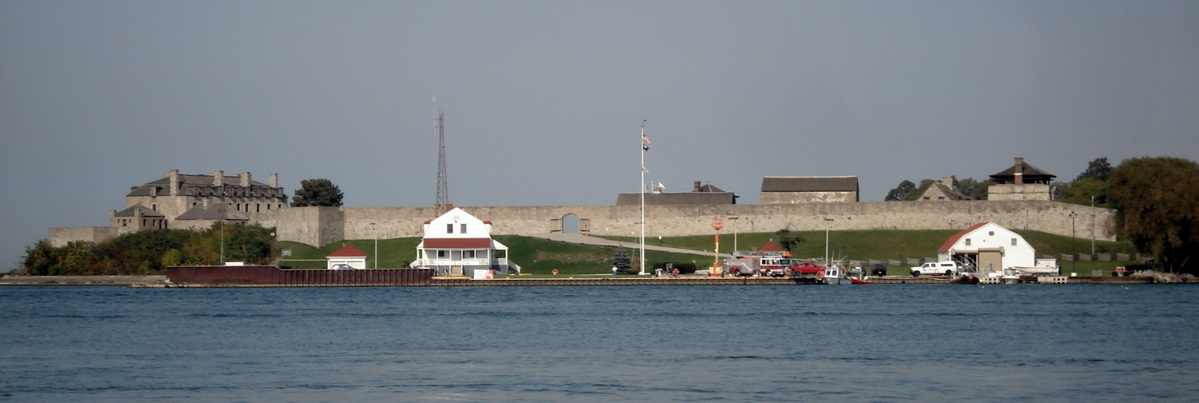
View of Fort Niagara from the Canadian side of the Niagara River

During the Korean War, the fort was a headquarters for anti-aircraft artillery and later Nike missiles. The Niagara Falls Defense Area originally formed the northern half of the U.S. Army Anti-Aircraft Command defenses in western New York State. After the amalgamation of the Niagara Falls and Buffalo Defense Areas, the Army Air Defense Command Post moved to Lockport Air Force Station in Cambria, New York.

Formations directing US defenses included the 2nd Artillery Group (Air Defense), which had its headquarters at Fort Niagara from March 1958 to December 1961, superseded by the 31st Artillery Brigade (Air Defense), 101st Artillery Group, and 18th Artillery Group. The only battalion in the region was the 44th Anti-Aircraft Missile Battalion, superseded by the 1st Battalion, 4th Air Defense Artillery Regiment on September 1, 1958.

The U.S. Army officially deactivated Fort Niagara in 1963. The 1/4 ADA moved to the Seattle Defense Area, where it was active from September 1972 to April 1974. Military presence on the site continues with the United States Coast Guard operating at "The Bottoms". Fort Niagara is considered one of the longest continuously run military bases within the boundaries of the United States, from French control in 1726 to the present day.

A formal operating license between Old Fort Niagara Association and the U.S. War Department in 1931 established rights of the non-profit to preserve and operate the fort. In 1949, Congress transferred Father Millet Cross National Monument to the State of New York, now a small memorial at Fort Niagara. In 1960, the fort was among the first sites to be designated a National Historic Landmark by the Department of Interior's National Park Service.

== Today ==
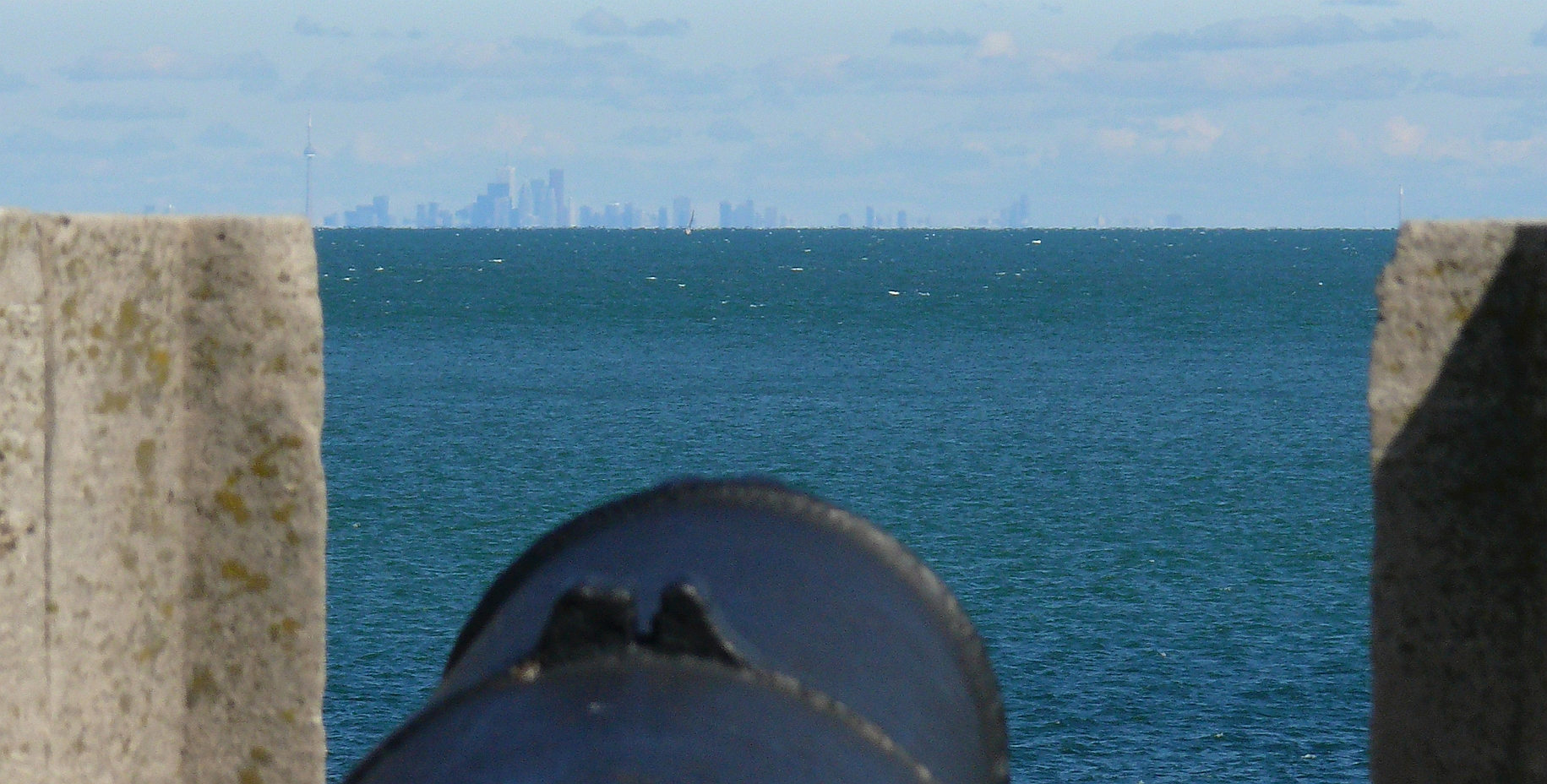
Historic cannon at Fort Niagara; Toronto across the lake

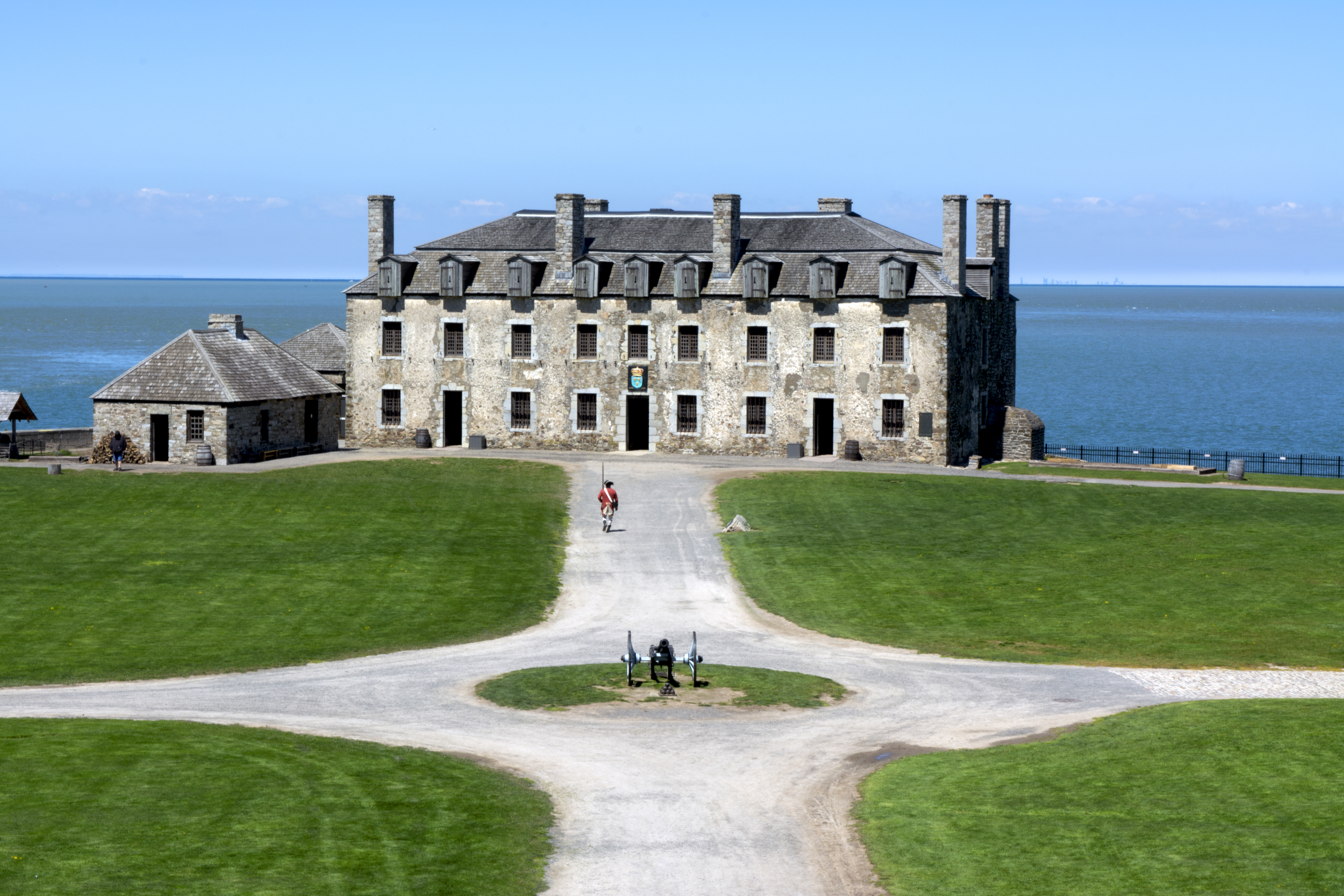
A reenactment in action during lunch hour at Fort Niagara. The skyline of Toronto may be seen on the horizon.

The renovated Fort Niagara now serves as Fort Niagara State Park and museum. It is often the site of historical reenactments of 18th-century battles that took place here. It is also a venue for period dances, fundraisers, and other special events (such as public displays, and shows relating to the history of the fort and the surrounding area). Fort Niagara is also designated as a State Historic Site, known as Old Fort Niagara State Historic Site.

Fort Niagara was designated a National Historic Landmark on October 9, 1960, as "Old Fort Niagara". The Colonial Niagara Historic District was placed on the National Register of Historic Places on October 15, 1966. It is a major contributing element to the Niagara Falls National Heritage Area.

In June 2025, the fort announced plans to build a replica 18th-century log cabin designed to depict the housing provided by the British during the American Revolution to its Native American allies. The building is scheduled to open in 2026 and serve as a Native American Education Center.

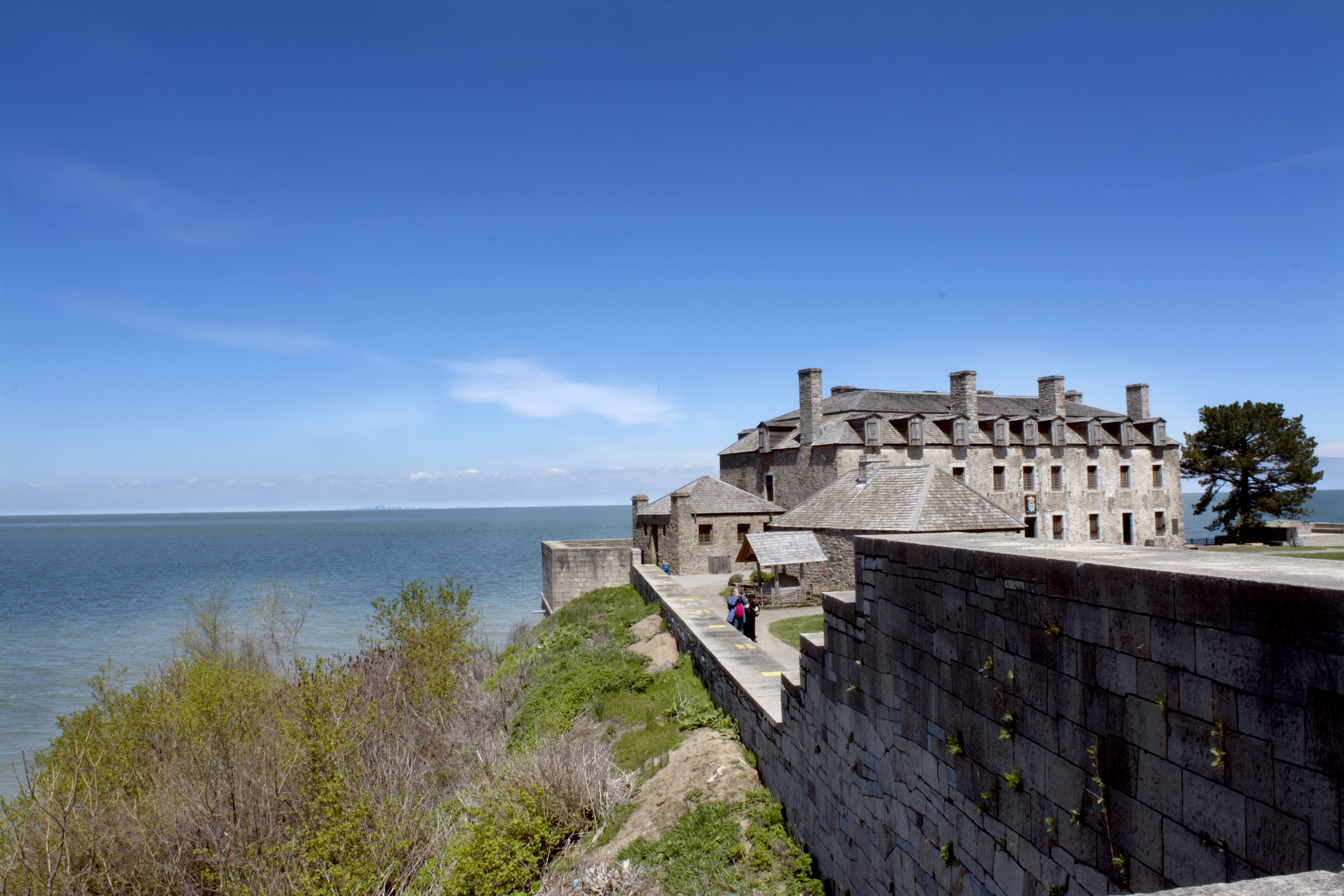
Lake Ontario from Fort Niagara

== Haunting legend ==
Some believe the site is haunted by a headless French soldier who was beheaded during a duel. It is said he wanders the grounds looking for his head.

== See also ==
- Military of New France
- List of French forts in North America
- List of National Historic Landmarks in New York
- List of New York State Historic Sites
- Fort Erie National Historic Site – at the source of the Niagara River
- Fort George National Historic Site – also opposite Fort Niagara, in Ontario
- Fort Mississauga – opposite Fort Niagara, on the Ontario side of the Niagara River
