= Siege of St. John's =

1705 siege of Queen Anne's War

Coordinates: 47.5708°N 52.6991°W

- Part of Queen Anne's War
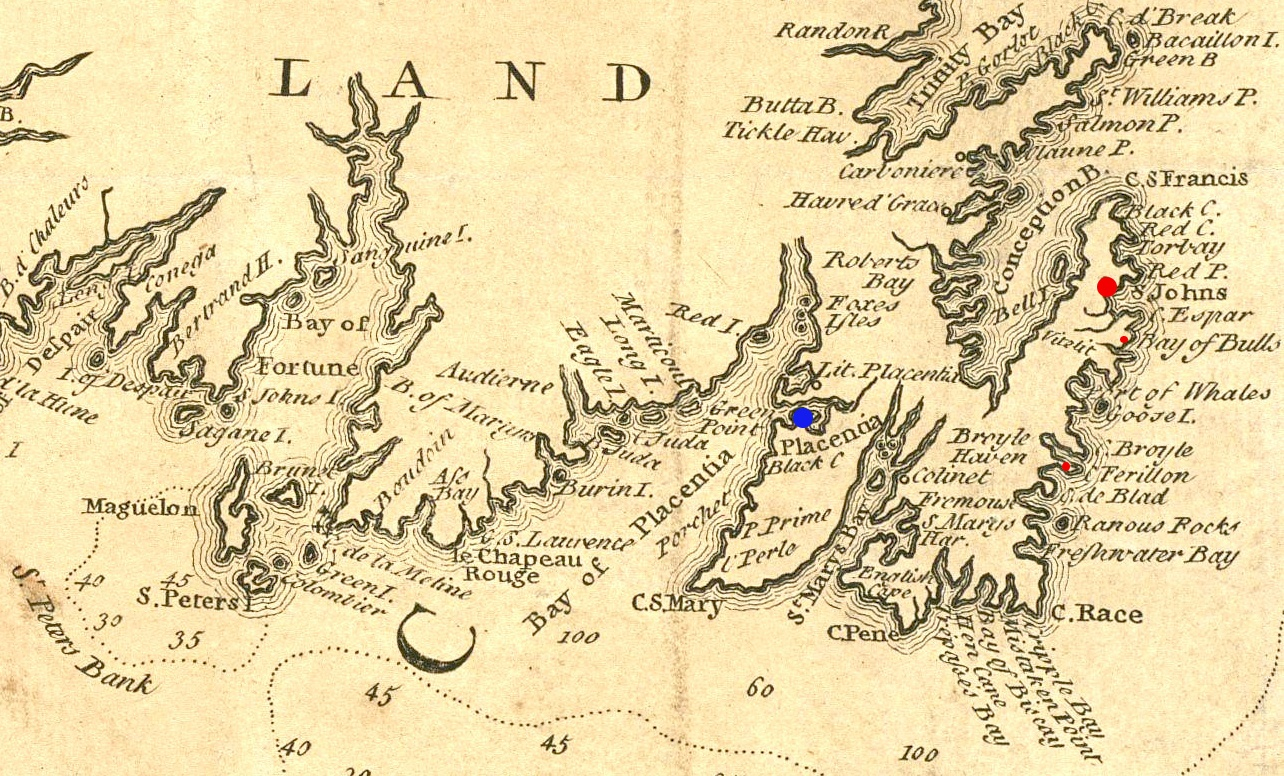
- Extract of a 1744 map showing southeastern Newfoundland. Plaisance is marked in blue, St. John's and smaller English settlements are marked in red.
| Date | 1 February – 5 March 1705 |
| Location | St. John's, Newfoundland |
| Result | English victory |

Belligerents
| France; Mi'kmaq; Abenakis | England |

Commanders and leaders
| Daniel d'Auger de Subercase; Josué Dubois Berthelot de Beaucours; Chief Escumbuit; Jean-Baptiste Hertel de Rouville; Jacques Testard de Montigny | John Moody; Robert Latham |

Strength
| 450 Marines and Canadian Militia | 50–60 soldiers and militia |

Casualties and losses
| 200 | 3 killed 200 civilians captured |

The siege of St. John's was a failed attempt by French forces led by Daniel d'Auger de Subercase to take the fort at St. John's, Newfoundland during the winter months of 1705, in Queen Anne's War. Leading a mixed force of regulars, militia, and Indians, Subercase burned much of the town and laid an ineffectual siege against the fort for five weeks between late January and early March 1705. Subercase lifted the siege after running out of provisions and gunpowder.

The siege was part of a larger-scale expedition that was an attempt to repeat the highly destructive expedition led by Pierre Le Moyne d'Iberville in 1696. Many outlying English communities were destroyed by Subercase's men, leading to reprisal raids by the English. Fishing activities on both sides suffered for the duration of the war, which ended with the French cession of its claims to Newfoundland.

== Background ==
The island of Newfoundland had been contested territory between France and England for some time before Queen Anne's War broke out in 1702. French raids during King William's War in the 1690s had completely destroyed almost all of the English settlements, including the principal port of St. John's, located on the east side of the Avalon Peninsula of southeastern Newfoundland. However, an English squadron led by Sir John Gibson and Sir John Morris persuaded the displaced fishermen to return and rebuild along their side of the peninsula. The Treaty of Ryswick signed in September 1697 led to the English receiving Newfoundland and the French retaining Acadia. However, the terms of the treaty became void when the French re-established their capital in Plaisance, on the Avalon Peninsula's west side.

In 1702, English Captain John Leake raided a number of French settlements in Newfoundland, but avoided Plaisance due to the presence of French warships in the harbour. In 1703, Daniel d'Auger de Subercase arrived in Plaisance as the new governor and took command of a 150-man garrison and facilities that were in poor condition. After raiding Ferryland, he learned of a planned English attack on Plaisance, and prepared for the assault. It never came, as Admiral John Graydon, in what was widely seen in England as a cowardly move, called off the attack despite having significant advantages. Graydon was subsequently court martialled and dismissed from the service over his conduct in the entire campaign, which also included the failed siege of Guadeloupe.

=== French preparations ===
In late 1704, Subercase began planning an attack against the English settlements. In addition to his garrison, he recruited Canadiens and Abenakis from the mainland and as many settlers as possible to participate in the effort. In all, his force numbered about 450 when it set out across the peninsula on 8 January 1705. His corps included a company of over 100 men led by Josué Dubois Berthelot de Beaucours that included Jacques Testard de Montigny and the Abenaki war leader Escumbuit, both of whom had participated in Pierre Le Moyne d'Iberville's 1696 raid against English settlements. While most of the company went overland, a brigantine was sent around the peninsula with some heavy guns.

=== English defences ===
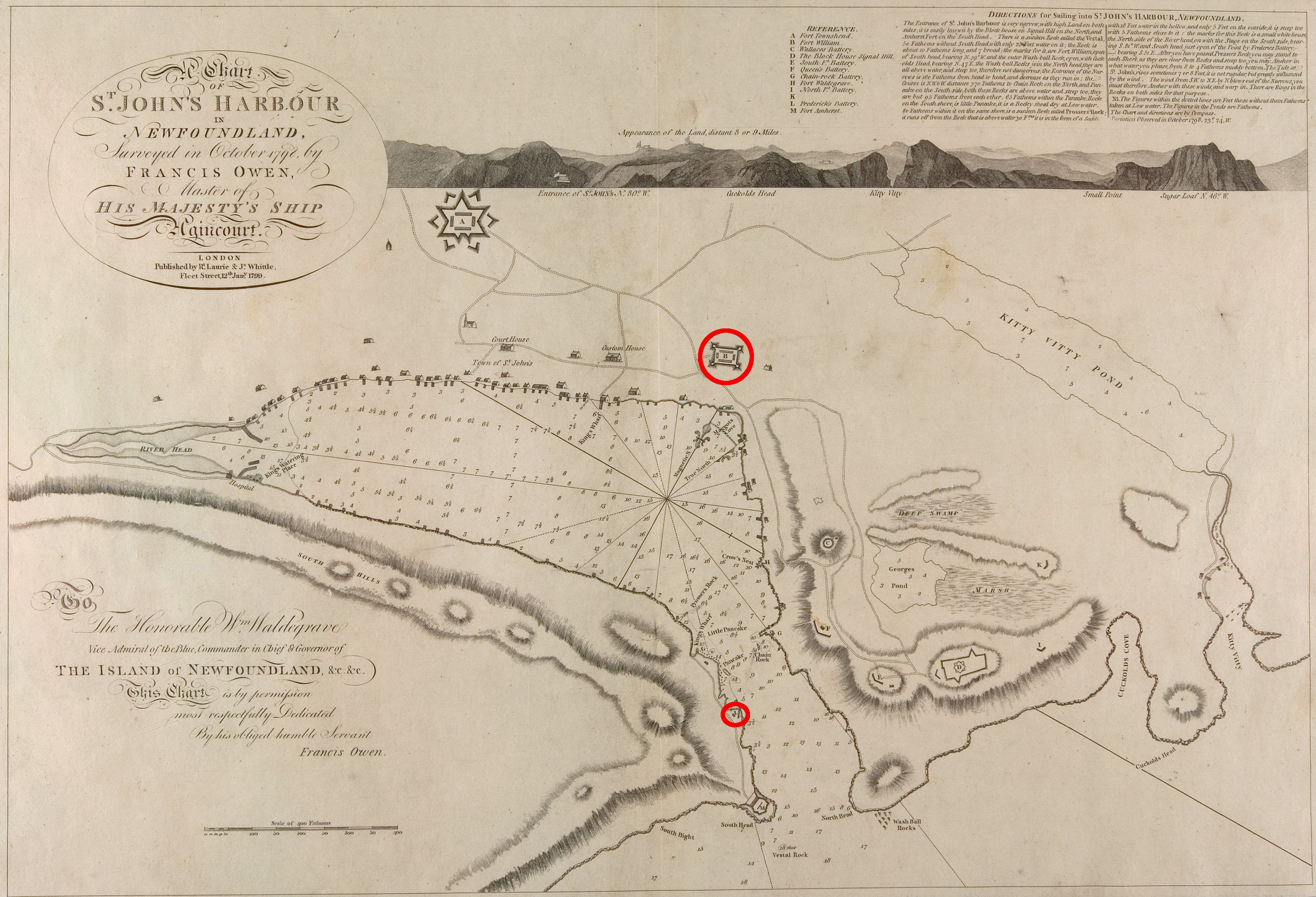
This 1798 map of St. John's includes defences that were erected in later years. Fort William and the South Castle have been highlighted.

St. John's was under the command of Lieutenant John Moody, with Lieutenant Robert Latham, a military engineer and mason, as his second in command. The principal defences of St. John's were Fort William, a stone fortification on the north side of the harbour built after the French expedition of 1696, and the South Castle, a stone fort on the south side of The Narrows which commanded the harbour entrance. Moody had put Latham in command of South Castle, while he commanded at Fort William. The combined defense force numbered between 50 and 60 men, with about a dozen under Latham's command.

== Siege ==
The progress of the French was quite slow, due to the extreme winter cold and snow. They first captured Bay Bulls and Ferryland (small coastal communities south of St. John's) without opposition, and then moved on to St. John's, where they arrived near the town on 31 January. Subercase had wanted to surprise the English, but the opportunity was lost when his advance guard approached within sight of the English defences (the remaining force having been delayed by poor conditions), and was driven off by cannon fire. Most of the community then fled to the protection of Fort William, and Subercase had to content himself with occupying the town while waiting for the brigantine to arrive. While he did take prisoners, he released the women and children to the fort in order to increase the burden on the English supplies. The women ended performing valuable assistance in helping with the fort's defence.

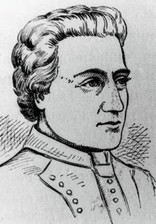
Plaisance Governor Daniel d'Auger de Subercase

After about two weeks' siege, Subercase attempted to use the divisions between Moody and Latham to diminish English morale and possibly achieve a negotiated surrender or gain control of Latham's post. He sent letters to both men, one from himself to Moody, and a second from one of the prisoners, addressed to Latham. The letter to Latham implied that a deal was in the works with Moody, and Subercase's agents tried to convince Latham to leave his works to meet with Moody. Latham refused, and Subercase's effort was ineffective.

After 33 days of waiting, in which the brigantine with the heavy guns never appeared, Subercase, running low on munitions and provisions, lifted the siege. He destroyed the town's houses and fishing stages, and returned to Plaisance, taking with him 200 civilian captives. Subercase detached Montigny and 70 men, who continued to raid English settlements through the rest of the winter.

== Aftermath ==
The French expedition took 1,200 prisoners in all, most of which were released due to a lack of provisions, and destroyed forty cannons, 2,000 fishing shallops, and 200 wagons, but failed to eliminate the stronghold. John Moody returned to England in late 1705, and was rewarded with a lieutenant's commission in the Coldstream Guards. He feuded with Latham, charging him with irregularities in his administration of the fortification works and poor command of South Castle, and his complaints led to Latham's recall.

Subercase continued to develop the French colony in 1705, which flourished despite the war. He was rewarded for his efforts with the Order of Saint Louis and the governorship of Acadia. There he presided over Port Royal's defences, successfully fending off British sieges in 1707, but was then forced to capitulate to overwhelming force in 1710.

Subercase's replacement at Plaisance, Philippe Pastour de Costebelle, negotiated an exchange of prisoners from the siege, and successfully captured St. John's in January 1709. France gave up claims of sovereignty over Newfoundland in the 1713 Treaty of Utrecht and, under Costebelle's supervision, moved the French settlers from Newfoundland to Louisbourg.

The site of Fort William is a National Historic Site of Canada (marked by a plaque), and the South Castle location is part of the Signal Hill National Historic Site.
