= Jacques Testard de Montigny =

French military officer (1663–1737)

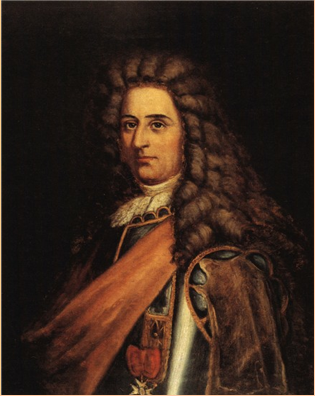
- Jacques Testard de Montigny (1663–1737)
- Born: 1663; Montreal, New France
- Died: 1737 (aged 73–74); Montreal, New France
- Spouse: 2 marriages
- Children: 7
- Relatives: Casimir-Amable Testard de Montigny (great-grandson)
- Military career
- Allegiance: Kingdom of France
- Branch: Compagnies Franches de la Marine
- Service years: 1690–1733
- Rank: Lieutenant
- Unit: French Marines in Canada
- Commands: Fort Michilimackinac
- Awards: Order of Saint Louis

Jacques Testard de Montigny (1663–1737) was a French military officer in the French Marines in Canada.

== Biography ==
Jacques Testard de Montigny was born in Montreal, New France, in 1663, into a merchant family. He first saw military action as a volunteer in the expedition against Schenectady in 1690. In 1692, he traveled to France with Pierre Le Moyne d'Iberville and was stationed in 1693 at Fort Nashwaak, the capital of Acadia. There, he led the local Abenaki and Mi'kmaq in raids against the English (see Battle of Fundy Bay). While posted in Acadia, he also engaged in trade and commerce, which sometimes conflicted with his military duties.

In 1696, Montigny joined d'Iberville's expedition against Pemaquid, an English fort on the northern frontier of Acadia. During this campaign, he began a close association with the Abenaki war leader Escumbuit, who also joined Montigny on d'Iberville's Newfoundland campaign later that year. This campaign saw the destruction of most English settlements on Newfoundland. Montigny was given an independent command by d'Iberville, in which he traveled along the coast, destroying settlements and fishing stages. However, the expedition had no lasting implications, as the English quickly rebuilt and fortified some of the settlements.

Montigny was promoted to lieutenant in 1700. In 1704, he returned to Acadia, where he helped orchestrate raids against English settlements and worked to convince the Abenakis to resettle closer to French territories. In the winter of 1704-05, he led a band of Abenakis to Newfoundland to replicate d'Iberville's 1696 expedition under the command of Daniel d'Auger de Subercase. They destroyed several English settlements but were unable to capture St. John's, the English capital.

In 1706, Montigny traveled to France with Escumbuit, where they were received by King Louis XIV. He participated in an expedition in 1709 to counter a potential English advance on Lake Champlain. The English did not progress beyond the southern end of the lake, and the only military action was a brief skirmish near Crown Point. Montigny was awarded the Order of Saint Louis in 1712 and, in 1721, was given command of a frontier fort on Green Bay. There, he maintained good relations with the Fox and was visited by Escumbuit. By 1726, he had returned to Montreal, and in 1730, he was appointed commandant of Fort Michilimackinac, a post he held for three years before retiring.

Montigny died in Montreal in 1737. He was married twice and had seven children.

== Legacy ==
Jacques Testard de Montigny is remembered for his military service in New France and his interactions with Indigenous leaders. His great-grandson, Casimir-Amable Testard de Montigny, continued the family legacy.

== See also ==
- Casimir-Amable Testard de Montigny, his great-grandson
- Portraits of Jacques Testard de Montigny, his wife, son, and daughter-in-law
- Military history of Nova Scotia
