= Newfoundland expedition (1702) =

1702 English naval raiding expedition

Coordinates: 47.08733°N 54.6698°W

- Part of Queen Anne's War
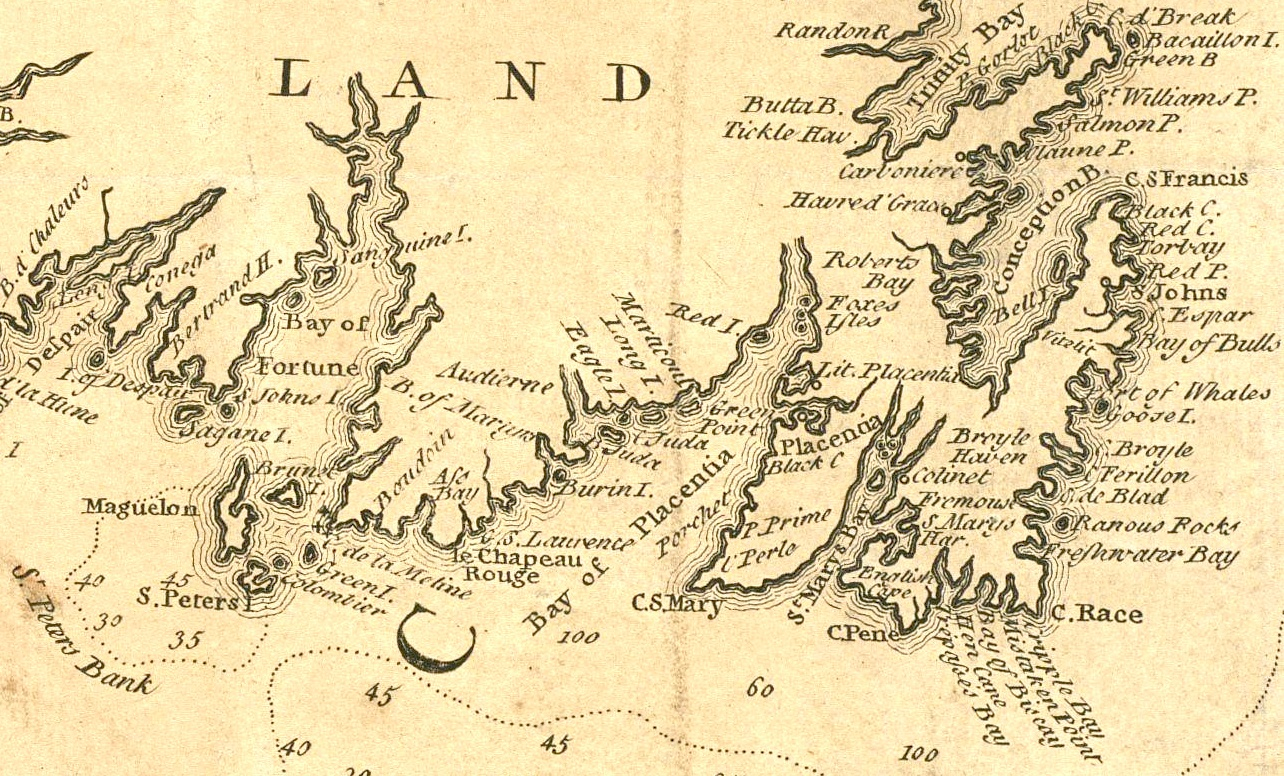
- Extract of a 1744 map showing southeastern Newfoundland
| Date | 28 August – 11 October 1702 (1 month, 1 week and 6 days) |
| Location | Newfoundland |
| Result | English victory |

Belligerents
| England | France |

Commanders and leaders
| John Leake | Sébastien Le Gouès; Philippe Costebelle |

Strength
| 9 ships | Unknown number of French colonists and militia |

Casualties and losses
| None | 51 merchantmen captured several merchantmen destroyed |

The Newfoundland expedition was a naval raiding expedition led by English Captain John Leake between August and October 1702 that targeted French colonial settlements on the North Atlantic island of Newfoundland and its satellite, Saint Pierre. The expedition occurred in the early days of Queen Anne's War, as the North American theater of the War of the Spanish Succession is sometimes known.

Leake's fleet descended on French settlements on the southern shore of Newfoundland, destroying fishing stages and other infrastructure. They captured fishing and trade ships, and destroyed most of the settlement at Saint Pierre. In a final flurry of activity before returning to England, Leake captured several ships from the French merchant convoy as it headed for Europe. More than 50 ships were taken in total, and six seasonal settlements were destroyed. The strongly fortified French base at Plaisance was not attacked.

== Background ==
Hostilities in the War of the Spanish Succession had begun in 1701, but England did not get involved until 1702, planning a major naval expedition against targets in Spain. On 9 June 1702 (Old Style) Newfoundland also became a target when George Churchill, chief advisor to the Lord High Admiral, Prince George, informed Captain John Leake, "I have proposed to the Prince, your going to command a squadron to Newfoundland; you will be a Chief of Squadron". Leake's commission, issued on 24 June, came with instructions to investigate the military strength of the French in Newfoundland, and to "annoy them there in their fishing harbours and at sea". He was also to convoy merchant ships in both directions, report on the conditions of the English settlements and fisheries, and act as governor of the territory while he was there. To accomplish this he was given command of HMS Exeter and a small fleet of ships. On 22 July 1702, he departed from Plymouth with a fleet of nine ships, including six ships of the line. His ships included (in addition to Exeter) the fourth rates HMS Assistance, HMS Montagu, HMS Lichfield, HMS Medway, and HMS Reserve.

Newfoundland had been the site of much conflict during King William's War (1689–1697). The most ambitious expedition had been conducted by French and Indian forces led by Pierre Le Moyne d'Iberville in 1696. His raiding expedition was highly destructive: it completely destroyed almost all of the English settlements on the island. Many of these were rebuilt shortly afterwards, and the chief English port at St. John's was strongly fortified.

Permanent French settlements on Newfoundland were relatively few. Most of their settlements, such as those in Trepassey Bay and St. Mary's, were only used in the summertime by fishermen who returned to Europe at the end of the season. The principal town of Plaisance was permanently settled, and its fortifications housed a small garrison. In 1702 it was temporarily under the command of Philippe Pastour de Costebelle, a captain of the French Marines in Canada, who was awaiting the arrival of the next governor, Daniel d'Auger de Subercase (who did not arrive until 1703). The permanent French population of Newfoundland was fairly small—only 180 French settlers left Newfoundland when the colony was abandoned in 1713.

The French also had a small settlement on the island of Saint Pierre, just south of Newfoundland in the Gulf of Saint Lawrence. Its governor, Sébastien Le Gouès, Sieur de Sourdeval, had only arrived in July 1702, and erected a crude wooden fort armed with a few guns.

== Raids ==
=== Newfoundland ===
Leake's fleet arrived in late August at Bay Bulls. From the inhabitants they learned that two French fishing ships were loading at Trepassey Bay, and that two French warships were at anchor near the French capital at Plaisance. He also learned that the French routinely posted spies to observe activities at Bay Bulls, and were likely to report the fleet's presence to Plaisance—a three-day overland trek.

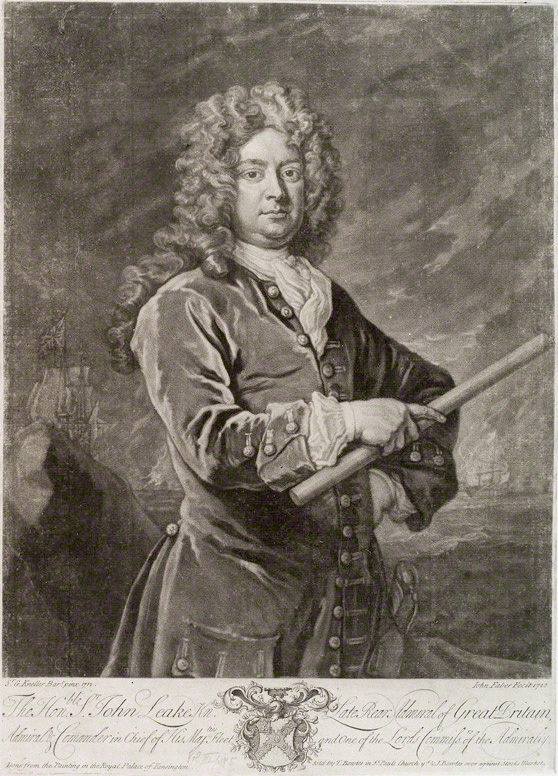
Commodore John Leake

Leake consequently moved with speed, heading south and west toward the French settlements. On 28 August the fleet made its first captures, taking a French ship recently arrived from the French West Indian isle of Martinique, the two at Trepassey Bay, and two more that Lichfield chased down. The next day Leake captured another French ship in St. Mary's Bay, and was rejoined by Montagu, which had taken three prizes the day before. Ordering Montagu, Lichfield, and Charles Galley to make for Colinet, Leake took the rest of the fleet to St. Mary's, where he chased a ship aground, and then sent out boats to refloat her. Landing parties were sent ashore, where they destroyed fishing stages, houses, shipbuilding equipment and unfinished ships, and many small boats.

After destroying the facilities at Colinet, the fleet regrouped on the 30th. Leake ordered a few of his ships to escort the captured prizes to St. John's, and then to cruise off Cape Race for 14 days looking for prizes. Leake detached Montagu and Lichfield to destroy St. Lawrence while he sailed for Saint Pierre.

=== Saint Pierre ===
Leake's account places his first arrival off Saint Pierre on 1 September. Bad weather prevented him from entering the harbour until the next day. He was therefore only able to capture two of the eight ships that had been in the harbour, because the rest got away through a shallow channel. On the 3rd he again approached the harbour, but did not report landing, and left then Saint Pierre to head for St. John's.

Leake's fleet reassembled at St. John's on 7 September. He then detached about half the fleet, led by the Medway and Charles Galley, to return to Saint Pierre to destroy it, while he took the other half north toward Bonavista. There he hoped to acquire experienced pilots with knowledge of other French harbours. Failing in this endeavour (none of the pilots he found had the needed experience, and also expressed concerns over the advancing winter conditions), he returned to St. John's. He was met there on 2 October by the other half of the fleet, which had completed the destruction of Saint Pierre.

Saint Pierre's Governor Sourdeval reported in a letter dated 11 October (presumably New Style, thus 30 September Old Style) that the English had twice landed men, on 7 and 8 October. He reported the second landing to consist of 400 men, who besieged him in his small fort. He surrendered after they exchanged gunfire for several hours, after which the English destroyed most of the facilities. They then deposited 52 French prisoners captured earlier in the expedition, and left.

=== Cruising for the French convoy ===
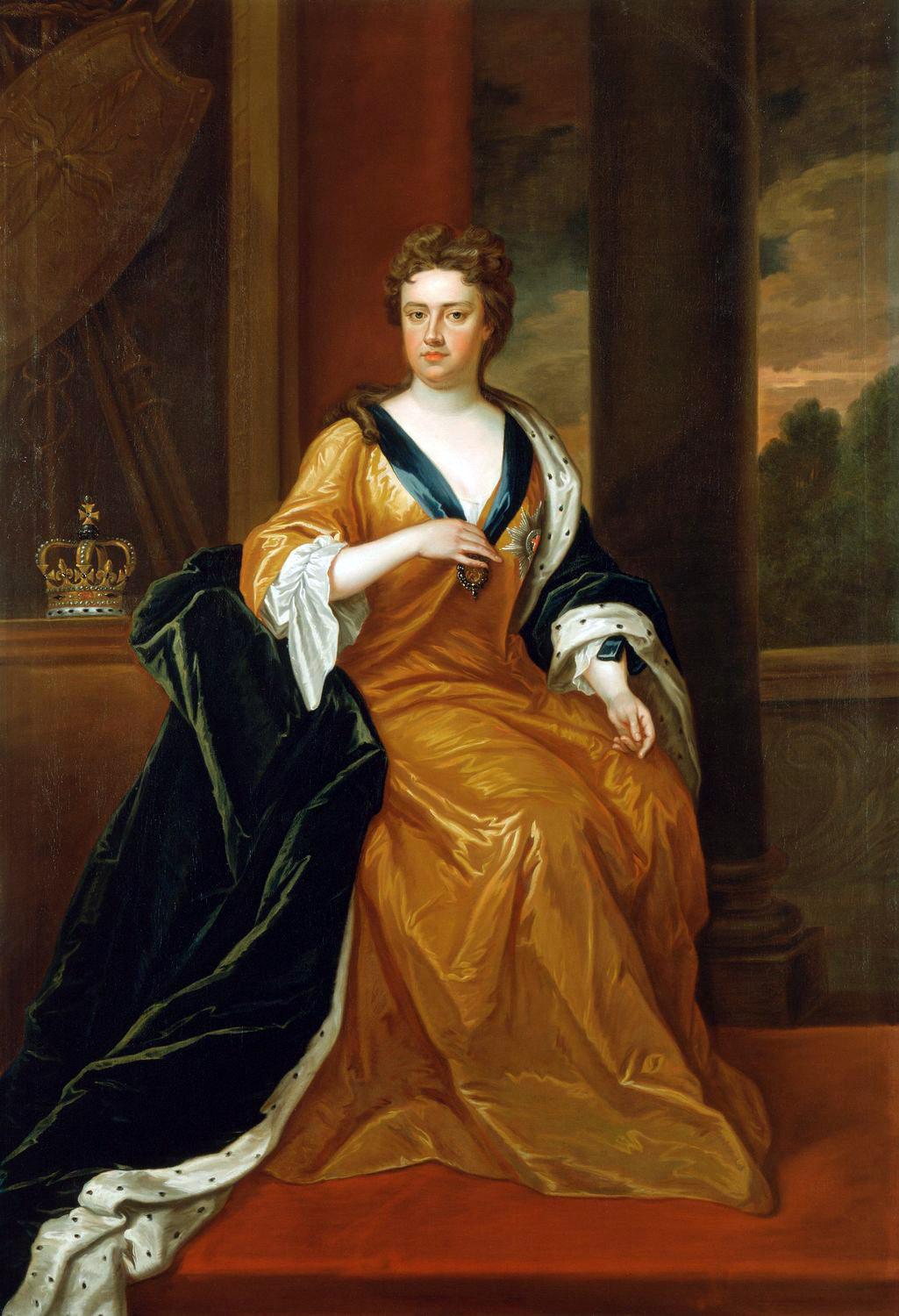
Queen Anne, portrait by Sir Godfrey Kneller

Leake then divided the fleet to begin the return to Europe. Montagu and Looe were assigned to convoy merchants and prizes destined for Portugal, while Reserve, Charles Galley, and Firebrand were set to escort those destined for England. Leake took the rest of the fleet and cruised off Cape Race for several weeks, hoping to intercept the French convoy that would have to pass nearby before winter set it. Weather conditions were often quite stormy, but Leake managed to take eight prizes before he finally sailed for England in mid-October.

== Aftermath ==
Leake reported taking 51 ships. Sixteen were sent to England, six to Portugal, and five were sold at St. John's. He left two ships at St. John's as part of its defence force. The remaining ships, including their cargoes and trade goods that had not been loaded before they were taken, were destroyed. Six French settlements were destroyed: Trepassey, St. Mary's, Colinet, Great and Little St. Lawrence, and Saint Pierre. Upon his return to England, Leake was received with favour by Queen Anne. He was promoted to rear admiral for his actions, and went on to have a distinguished career for the rest of the war, serving in European waters.

Newfoundland continued to be contested throughout the war, with each side waging economic war against the other's settlements, destroying fishing stages and other infrastructure. The main English settlement at St. John's was besieged in 1705 and captured in 1709 by French forces from Plaisance. Sovereignty of the entire island passed to Great Britain with the 1713 Treaty of Utrecht, although the French were granted some rights to dry fish on shore. Saint Pierre also came under British control, but it and neighboring Miquelon were eventually given to France after the War of the Austrian Succession.
