= Philippe Pastour de Costebelle =

French naval officer and colonial Canadian politician (1661-1717)

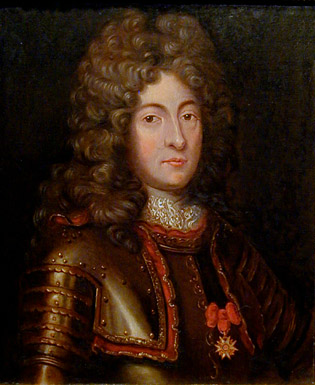

Governor of Plaisance
- In office 1706–1713
- Preceded by: Daniel d'Auger de Subercase
- Succeeded by: Office Abolished

Île-Royale
- In office 1713–1717
- Preceded by: New Office
- Succeeded by: Joseph de Monbeton de Brouillan

Personal details
- Born: c.1661 Languedoc
- Died: October 1717 Louisbourg, New France

Philippe Pastour de Costebelle (c. 1661 – October 1717) was a French naval officer and Governor of Newfoundland and then Louisbourg. He was born in Languedoc, France and died in Louisbourg, New France.

Costebelle served in the French Navy as early as 1683, and in 1692 served as lieutenant to a marine infantry company sent to Plaisance, the principal French settlement on Newfoundland. There he was immediately involved in defending the port from English naval assaults in the ongoing King William's War, and embarked on raiding expeditions against English settlements on the island. Costebelle distinguished himself, and was promoted to captain in 1694, and lieutenant in 1695. That year he was ordered to improve the fortifications and establish contact with the English colonists in St. Mary's Bay. In 1696 Costebelle was sent to France, and thus did not participate in Pierre LeMoyne d'Iberville's celebrated and destructive Avalon Peninsula Campaign.

When he returned to Plaisance in 1697 he had hoped to succeed to the governorship, but was instead forced to continue in the role of king's lieutenant under first Joseph de Monic and then Daniel d'Auger de Subercase. Monic was frequently absent from the colony, so Costebelle spent a significant time during Monic's tenure in actual command of the colony. In 1702, while awaiting Subercase's arrival, Costebelle rallied the province's defences against English Captain John Leake's raiding expedition that brought Queen Anne's War (the War of the Spanish Succession) to Newfoundland.

Subercase arrived to take command in 1703, and adopted a vigorous strategy against the English. In 1705 he led a raiding expedition against English outposts that sought to repeat d'Iberville's successes in 1696. Costebelle went on the expedition, but was injured in an accident en route and saw no action. Subercase's expedition was partly successful, destroying many English settlements, but he was unable to take St. John's. Subercase was rewarded with the governorship of Acadia, and Costebelle was finally appointed governor of Plaisance in 1706. In June 1708 he was awarded the Order of Saint Louis.

In December 1708 Costebelle organized a successful attack on the British at St. John's. Although he captured the town and its fortress, he did not have the resources to hold it, and it was eventually reoccupied by the English. By the Treaty of Utrecht of 1713 Newfoundland was handed over to Britain and King Louis XIV ordered Costebelle to evacuate the colony in the spring of 1714. Costebelle oversaw the evacuation of French subjects from Newfoundland to Cape Breton Island, where the colony of Île-Royale was established. Costebelle became its first governor, and oversaw the establishment of Louisbourg (although construction of its fortress was not begun until after his death). Costebelle returned to France briefly in 1717, and died at Fort Dauphin (satellite fort of Louisbourg) not long after his return in October 1717.

Costebelle was twice married, and had two daughters.

== See also ==
- Governors of Newfoundland
- List of people of Newfoundland and Labrador

Political offices
Preceded by Daniel d'Auger de Subercase	Governor of Plaisance; 1706–1713	Succeeded by Henry Osborn as Commodore Governor of the Colony of Newfoundland
New office	Governor of Île-Royale; 1713–1717	Succeeded by Joseph de Monbeton de Brouillan, dit Saint-Ovide
