= Thomas Lloyd (garrison commander) =

British army officer

Major Thomas Lloyd
- Born: Wales
- Died: 1710 France
- Cause of death: Duel

Thomas Lloyd (died 1710) was a British army officer who commanded the garrison at St. John's, Newfoundland.

Lloyd, after being a junior officer in the colony, was appointed to garrison commander in 1703 following the departure of Captain Michael Richards.

Lloyd was generally disliked by his men, his financial and business practices on the island, although not uncommon, were felt more severely in Newfoundland as a system of checks and balances had yet to have been established.

In the summer of 1704, upon the arrival of Captain Timothy Bridges, he found that residents and soldiers were completely dissatisfied with Lloyd. Bridges, who had been threatened by his men that they would desert, took Lloyd back with him to England in October and left John Moody in charge. Bridges, however, denied that he had formally suspended Lloyd.

In 1705, Lloyd returned to Newfoundland with a new company. Lloyd maintained close relations with influential members of St. John's society, who, in turn, showed their support for him. Lloyd would get in trouble with the Board of Trade in 1706, when he attempted to dirty Moody's reputation, as well as for his treatment of his soldiers.

On 1 January 1709, French forces overwhelmed Lloyd and his soldiers at Fort William. Captain George Vane attempted to fight back after the initial attack, however, he was also taken Prisoner. Lloyd, along with many of his men and supplies, were transferred from St. John's to Plaisance, the capital of the French colony in Newfoundland. Lloyd wrote many letters whilst in captivity, in which he requested to be exchanged, stand to court-martial, and in one, denounced Vane as a coward.

Following an inquest after the battle, the true extent of how disliked Lloyd was, was revealed. Fort William was said to have been taken with little-to-no resistance, seeing as a majority of the men were demoralized. In an even more shocking report, it was said that some men were glad the French had captured the fort, provided that Major Lloyd was hanged.
