= Raid on Haverhill (1708) =

Part of Queen Anne's War

Coordinates: 42°46′34″N 71°04′40″W

- Part of Queen Anne's War
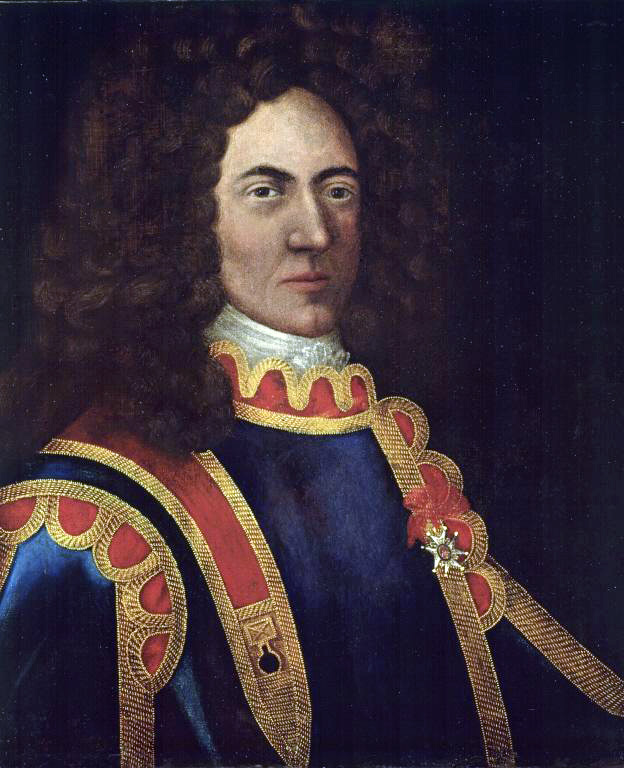
- Jean-Baptiste Hertel de Rouville, French commander
Date	29 August 1708
Location	Haverhill, Province of Massachusetts Bay
Result	French victory

Belligerents
New England	French colonists Algonquin; Montagnais

Commanders and leaders
Simon Wainwright †; Major Turner; Samuel Ayer †	Jean-Baptiste Hertel de Rouville; Chief Escumbuit

Strength
70+ militia	250 native warriors and French Canadian militia

Casualties and losses
16 killed, 14–24 militia and inhabitants captured	9 killed 18 wounded

The Raid on Haverhill was a military engagement that took place on August 29, 1708, during Queen Anne's War. French, Algonquin, and Abenaki warriors under the command of Jean-Baptiste Hertel de Rouville descended on Haverhill, then a small frontier community in the Province of Massachusetts Bay. In the surprise attack, 16 people were killed and another 14 to 24 were taken captive. A rapid militia muster gave chase, and in a skirmish later in the day, nine of the French and Indian party were killed and some of their prisoners escaped.

Haverhill was not the original target of the raiders. Expecting a larger Indian contingent, French authorities planned to engage in a series of raids on the communities of the Piscataqua River. However, the unwillingness of some Indian tribes to participate in the expedition forced the French to reduce the scope of the operation and choose an easier target. The raid was more costly to the French than previous frontier raids like that in 1704 on Deerfield, Massachusetts because the province had been warned of the raiders' advance.

== Background ==
When Queen Anne's War (as the War of the Spanish Succession was called in the colonies of British America) broke out in 1702, it sparked war on the already tense frontier between the English colonies of New England and the colonies of New France, including Acadia and Canada. French military officers from the troupes de la marine, the defense force of New France, often led parties of Indians from their settlements along the Saint Lawrence River south to the northern frontiers of New England, which then included small communities in what is now northern Massachusetts and southern New Hampshire and Maine.

The largest and most successful raid of the war occurred in February 1704, when Jean-Baptiste Hertel de Rouville led about 250 men, principally Indians on a raid against the frontier town of Deerfield in the Province of Massachusetts Bay. Hertel de Rouville's band killed or took prisoner many of the townsfolk, returning to Canada on a difficult trek in which a number of the prisoners died; many of the surviving captives were adopted into Indian communities afterward. Massachusetts fortified its frontier with militia in response to this raid, and launched a raid against Acadia in retaliation.

The Massachusetts village of Haverhill was also subjected to smaller-scale raids in 1704, but it was not originally the target of the ambitious expedition planned by New France's Governor-General Philippe de Rigaud Vaudreuil in 1708. In the aftermath of the failed English siege of Port Royal, Acadia in 1707, Vaudreuil was criticized by French Marine Minister the Comte de Pontchartrain for failing to apply sufficient pressure on the New England colonies. Vaudreuil was also concerned over the increasing tendency of Indians that were under French influence to engage in illicit trade with the Province of New York, cutting into New France's economic activity. Vaudreuil decided to address these issues by organizing a major raid into New England that was intended to be even larger in scope than the Deerfield raid.

Vaudreuil's plan was to amass a force of as many as 400 men for attacks on the towns of New Hampshire on the Piscataqua River. In order to maintain some secrecy over the size and target of the expedition, forces from several points along the Saint Lawrence River would descend to Lake Winnipesaukee, where they would rendezvous with Abenaki and Pennacook tribal parties. The main French party departed from Trois-Rivières, and consisted of about 100 men, drawn from Canadian militia and the troupes de la marine, under the command of Hertel de Rouville. This party included a number of veterans from the Deerfield raid, and they were accompanied by bands of Abenaki and Nipissing. A band of 220 Iroquois from the Kanehsatake and Kahnawake tribes was to depart Montreal under the command of René Boucher de La Perrière, and additional Huron and Abenakis were to come from near Quebec.

Reports that a major expedition was being planned made their way via Indian traders to Albany, New York, and from there to Boston. Because the expedition's targets were not known, little could be done to prepare specific defenses. A party of about 40 provincial militia were sent to Haverhill in response to these reports.

== Expedition difficulties ==
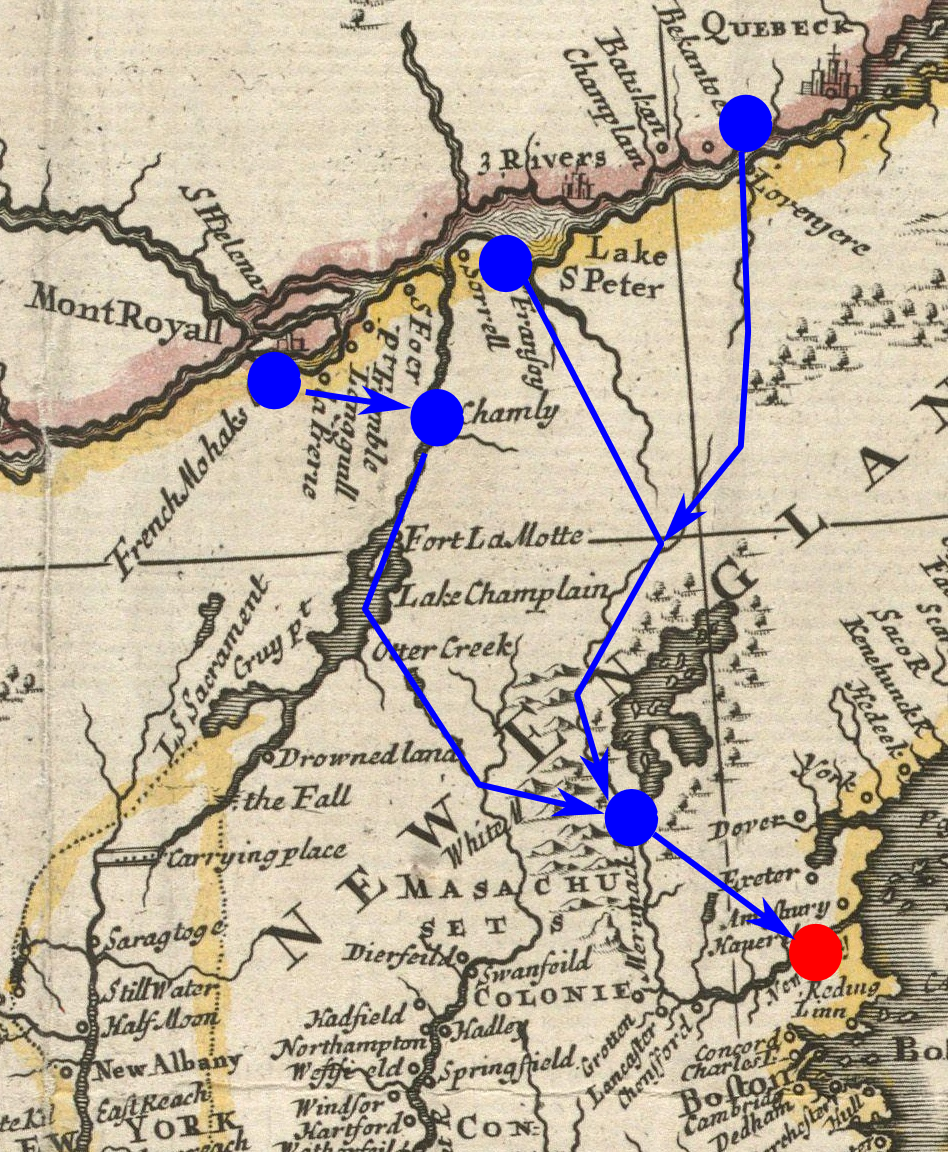
Detail from a 1719 map annotated to show the approximate routes taken (or planned) by French and Indian forces. Haverhill is marked in red, and the French and Indian routes and rendezvous points are marked in blue.

Elements of the expedition departed in mid-July from the Saint Lawrence River. As the Quebec party ascended the Saint-François River, a Huron died in an accident. This was viewed as a bad portent by many of the Indians, and the Hurons turned back. Among the Iroquois from Montreal, who traveled via Lake Champlain, some men fell sick and the rest refused to continue, in what some contemporaries thought was a ruse by the Iroquois to avoid conflict. Vaudreuil believed this was the case, and reports reached the English at Albany that the Iroquois had deliberately chosen to abandon the expedition "not to join war against New England." Despite these setbacks, Vaudreuil ordered Hertel de Rouville to press on, even if he received no further reinforcements. When his company reached Lake Winnipesaukee, he found that no eastern Indians willing to participate in the expedition had been found. Hertel de Rouville was consequently left with a band of about 160 men, which limited his options for raiding targets to places that were less fortified.

Haverhill was chosen as the target for several reasons. The village layout was already well known from the 1704 raids and from an earlier raid in the Nine Years' War. It was not particularly large (25 to 30 houses), its location lent itself poorly to defense, and only some of the houses were fortified. A fast-moving raiding party could be in and out of the village before the alarm could be raised. The party arrived outside Haverhill and prepared to begin the raid on Sunday, August 29. It was joined at some point on its travels by the exiled Abenaki war chief Escumbuit, who lived not far from Haverhill, and had received word of the expedition's advance.

At the time, responsibility for Haverhill's defense was divided. The local militia was under the command of Simon Wainwright, whose house had a view of the entire village. The town's defenses had been supplemented by three small (three to four man) garrisons of colonial troops under the overall command of Major Turner.

== Raid ==
The raiders successfully sneaked past the outer garrisons of provincial militia, and were first spotted in the pre-dawn light by a villager. Firing his gun to raise the alarm, he ran for the village, with the French and Indians in noisy pursuit. The action quickly became general as the raiders descended on the houses in the village. One of the colonial garrisons was stationed in the home of the minister, Benjamin Rolfe, who had barred the door in an attempt to keep the raiders out. Raiders fired through the door, wounding Rolfe, and then broke the door down. They then slaughtered Rolfe, his wife, infant child, and the colonial militiamen, who, "paralyzed by fear", were begging for mercy. In another house, one baby was thrown through an open window by a raider but suffered no injury. A number of villagers escaped by hiding in cellars whose trapdoors were not discovered by the raiders. Captain Wainwright was preparing to organize a defense when gunfire from the raiders passed through the door to his house, killing him instantly.

The raiding and pillaging continued until the sounds of approaching militia companies reached the raiders, who quickly lit the town meetinghouse on fire and left with their accumulated prisoners and loot. The reinforcements came from neighboring communities (some from as far away as Salem) and mustered under Major Turner's command when they arrived. One party of Haverhill militiamen discovered the raiders' baggage camp several miles from the village, and took their packs. Captain Samuel Ayer's company, numbering about 20, pursued the retreating raiders. Eventually strengthened by further militia, he engaged the encumbered raiders. In a furious rear-guard action the raiders fought off the militia (killing Ayer in the action), but lost nine killed, including Hertel de Rouville's brother, and 18 wounded. Because of the skirmish, the raiders abandoned some of their loot, and some of their prisoners got away. The village recorded that 30 to 40 people were killed or captured, which included those who escaped in the later skirmish.

== Aftermath ==
The raiders' return to Canada was difficult. Joseph Bartlett, one of their captives, described the privations suffered due to the loss of the force's baggage. One day they caught a hawk, which was divided among 15 men; his share, the head, was "the largest meal I had these four days." Bartlett remained in captivity with the Indians for four years. Some of the Frenchmen, rather than attempt the journey without their supplies, surrendered themselves to Massachusetts authorities.

French accounts of the raid greatly exaggerated the numbers involved, claiming that several hundred had been killed, and that the post-raid skirmish had involved as many as 200 English colonists.The raid was more costly to the French than previous raids had been: because of better preparedness on the part of the Massachusetts militia, the French suffered a higher proportion of casualties than they had in the Deerfield raid.

The raid was the last large-scale attack the French launched against Massachusetts in the war. Minor attacks occurred along its frontier, and Wells, then part of Massachusetts but now in Maine, was attacked by a substantial force in 1712. Port Royal fell in 1710 to an expedition that included British marines, and the British abandoned a 1711 naval expedition against Quebec after some of its troop transports ran aground at the mouth of the St. Lawrence with significant loss of life.
