= John Moody (British Army officer) =

British Army officer

John Moody (c. 1677 – 1736) was an officer in the British army who served as deputy governor of Placentia from 1714 to 1717.

In 1703, Moody was named a lieutenant serving with Michael Richards in Newfoundland. When Thomas Lloyd was removed from command of the garrison at St. John's in October 1704, Moody was left in charge. In January 1705, Moody's men at Fort William were attacked by French troops from Placentia; although heavily outnumbered, they were able to hold off the enemy. As a result, in 1707, he was named a lieutenant in the Coldstream Guards. When Britain was given control of Placentia by the Treaty of Utrecht, Moody was promoted to lieutenant-colonel and appointed deputy governor of Placentia; at the time, Placentia fell under the control of the governor of Nova Scotia, Francis Nicholson. Moody was able to purchase the estates of the departing French residents; this brought him into conflict with English fishing captains who visited the area and who used areas on shore to store and dry their catch.

He was called back to England in 1717 to answer complaints laid against him and to settle the garrison's accounts. Martin Purcell was named to the position of deputy governor but never came to Newfoundland. Moody settled in London, where he lived on half-pay until his death.
