= Nescambious =

Maliseet tribal leader (c.1660–1727)

Assacumbuit (c.1660–1727; many variant spellings, including Escumbuit, Nescambiouit and Nescambious) was a Native American leader of the Maliseet tribe of the Abenaki who was knighted by Louis XIV of France in 1706.

== King William's War ==
During King William's War, he was first associated with the French in the siege of Fort St. John led by Pierre Le Moyne d'Iberville in 1696-1697 during the Avalon Peninsula Campaign. Even after the war was officially ended, Abenaki raids on the English colonists continued. On March 4, 1698, Escumbuit led a group of 30 Native Americans in an attack on Andover, Massachusetts, the last and most severe Native attack on this town.

== Queen Anne's War ==
During Queen Anne's War, he participated in the Northeast Coast Campaign. In early 1705 he was again in Newfoundland, where he participated in the Siege of St. John's and other French and Native American attacks against English colonial holdings. Later that year he was invited to France as part of France's bid for an alliance with his tribe. He returned to America in 1706. He fought in the 1708 Raid on Haverhill.

== Fearsome reputation ==
His reputation among the English colonists of New England was notorious—they called him a "bloody devil", and accused him of killing many women and children.

== Texts ==
- Abenaki Warrior: The Life and Times of Chief Escumbuit, Alfred E. Kayworth, 1998

== See also ==
- Island Pond (Rockingham County, New Hampshire) - Escumbuit is namesake of island in the pond
