= Battle of St. John's =

Part of a French expedition against English settlements in 1709

Coordinates: 47.5708°N 52.6991°W

- Part of Queen Anne's War
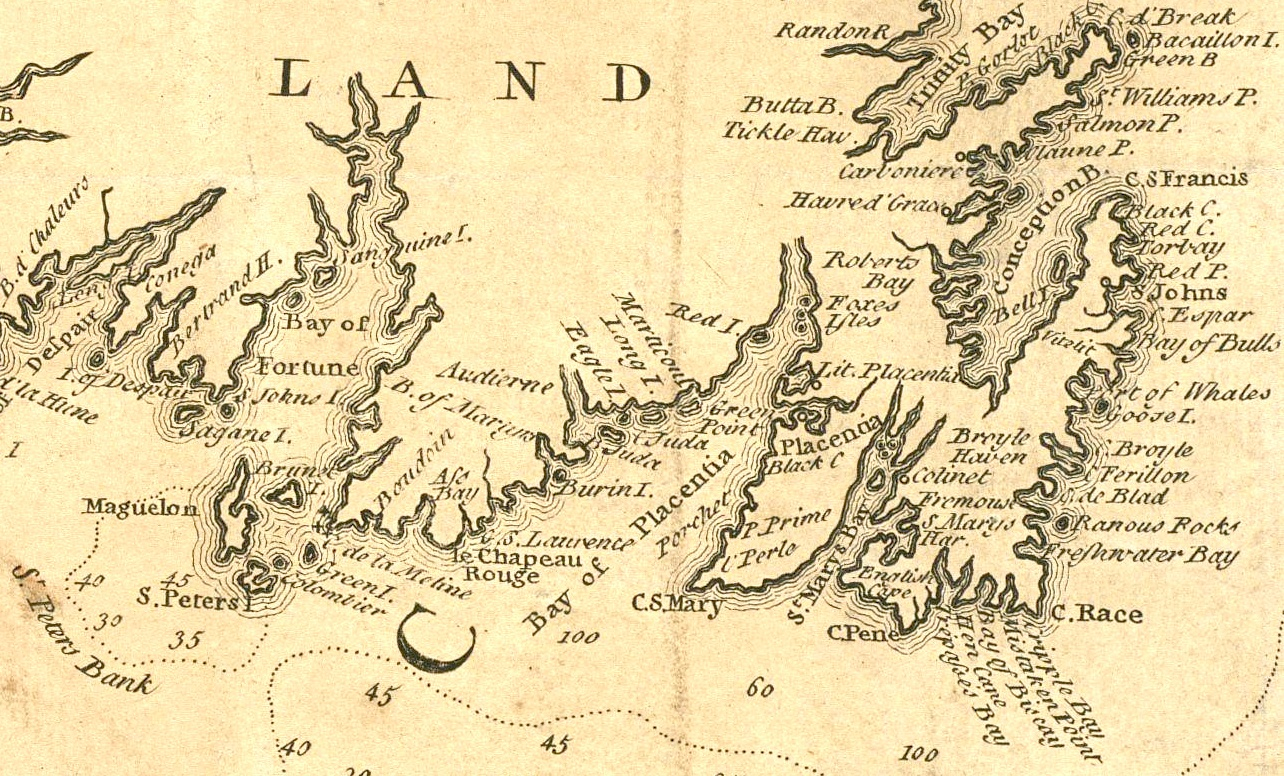
- Detail of 1744 map showing southeastern Newfoundland. "S Johns" is in the right center; Placentia (formerly Plaisance) is near the center.
Date	1 January 1709
Location	St. John's, Newfoundland
Result	French victory

Belligerents
France; Mi'kmaq; Abenakis	Great Britain

Commanders and leaders
Joseph de Monbeton de Brouillan de Saint-Ovide; Louis Denys de La Ronde	Thomas Lloyd (POW); George Vane (POW)

Strength
164 Marines; Frigate Vénus	80 troops about 400 colonists

Casualties and losses
3 killed 11 wounded	480 military and civilian prisoners

The Battle of St. John's was the French capture of St. John's, the capital of the British colony of Newfoundland, on 1 January 1709 [O.S. 21 December 1708], during Queen Anne's War. A mixed and motley force of 164 men led by Joseph de Monbeton de Brouillan de Saint-Ovide, king's lieutenant to Philippe Pastour de Costebelle, the French governor of Plaisance, quickly overwhelmed the British garrison at St. John's, and took about 500 prisoners.

Costebelle, whose resources were too limited to hold St. John's, destroyed its fortifications and abandoned it in April 1709. It was later reoccupied by the British. French colonial outposts in Newfoundland were abandoned after France ceded control of the island to Britain in the 1713 Treaty of Utrecht; most of the French settlers were relocated to Île-Royale, now known as Cape Breton Island.

== Background ==
The island of Newfoundland had been contested territory between France and England for some time before Queen Anne's War broke out in 1702. French raids during King William's War in the 1690s had completely destroyed English settlements, including the principal port of St. John's. The English rebuilt, occupying permanent and seasonal sites on the eastern side of the Avalon Peninsula, while the French occupied the western side, with their capital at Plaisance.

In 1702, English Captain John Leake raided a number of French settlements in Newfoundland, but avoided Plaisance because of the presence of French warships in the harbour. In the winter of 1704–5 Daniel d'Auger de Subercase, the French governor at Plaisance, led a siege of St. John's in which much of the town was destroyed, but Fort William was not taken. In the following year, French and Mi'kmaq raiding parties continued to harass English settlers, and the English sent naval forces that destroyed French settlements, although Plaisance was seen as too strong to assault.

Philippe Pastour de Costebelle, who succeeded Subercase as governor at Plaisance, was presented with an opportunity to once again assault St. John's directly when a number of French ships stopped at Plaisance in late 1708, including the frigate Vénus and some French privateers from the West Indies. To capitalise on the opportunity, he sent his lieutenant, Joseph de Monbeton de Brouillan de Saint-Ovide, to recruit a company of men for an overland assault on St. John's, which would be supported by Vénus' captain, Louis Denys de La Ronde. Saint-Ovide recruited a force of 164 from the various ships, the local settlers, and the Mi'kmaq, and set out for St. John's on 14 December 1708.

Major Thomas Lloyd returned to the command of St. John's in the winter of 1705–6, after having been maneuvered out of the post by John Moody, who had defended the fort during the 1705 siege. Lloyd had previously served in the post from 1696, and had acquired a reputation amongst the colonists for a violent and temperamental disposition that had contributed to his original ouster from the post in 1704. On his return to London he had various accusations against himself cleared, and was reinstated despite Moody's successful defence in 1705. From 1705 to 1708 he ran the colony without significant incident, and participated in a raiding expedition in 1707 against French fishing settlements. He organised militia companies and constructed new fortifications large enough to hold most of the population. He persuaded most of the people to spend the winter within the fortifications in 1708 because of the ongoing French and Indian raids.

== Battle ==
Saint-Ovide led the attack on the unprepared British garrison early on 1 January 1709. Fort William was under the command of Major Lloyd with the support of Lt. Timothy Gullye and Lt. Thomoas Phillips, with surgeon William Chalmers also in residence. Launching their attack on Fort William, the older of two fortifications, at 4 to 5 am, equipped with ladders, the attacking force was spotted and alarm given. Lloyd was roused from his bed on the alarm but the fort was quickly overwhelmed. The 160 French, Canadian and Indian force had overrun the 85 or so guarding and occupying the fort. A sally port connecting the old and new fortifications was locked, and the 440 defenders in the new fort were unable to assist in the defense of the other. After a brief resistance, George Vane, leading the defense of the new fort, surrendered. Gunner William I'Anson of Fort William reported numerous failings of the English force, including poor access to powder for their muskets, numerous instances of cowardice and indifference, and most pivotal in his view, a misapprehension concerning the alarm:

The calling of the centryes Fire! Fire! did, I believe, amuse ye soldiers in bedd, with ye thoughts of some house in ye new Fort to bee on fire, as had often happened. If they had gott to their armes, they would have given a good acct. of their enemyes, being known to bee generally resolute bold fellows. But one of our most immedyat misfortunes was yt. of those 19 inhabts. then on guard in Fort Wm., so few would meet ye enemy on ye walls, which had they done, they then had given time enough for ye rest to have turned out.

On his account, the entire battle lasted about three minutes. He reported that South Castle was taken two days later.

== Aftermath ==
The French occupied St. John's until April. Costebelle, rather than holding St. John's, ordered it to be abandoned and its fortifications destroyed. The British reoccupied and rebuilt on the site. France ceded most of its claims to Newfoundland in the 1713 Treaty of Utrecht, and Costebelle oversaw the relocation the French inhabitants to the new outpost of Louisbourg on Île-Royale (present-day Cape Breton Island). Saint-Ovide was awarded the Order of Saint Louis for his actions, and succeeded Costebelle as governor of Île-Royale in 1718.

St. John's fortifications have been commemorated as National Historic Sites of Canada, although the structures involved in this conflict were destroyed, and later superseded by other fortifications.

== See also ==
- Military history of the Mi’kmaq Warriors
