= Josué Dubois Berthelot de Beaucours =

Canadian politician

Josué Dubois Berthelot de Beaucours (ca 1662 – May 9, 1750) was a French military officer who was chief engineer of Canada and governor of Trois-Rivières and Montreal in New France. He was also known as Jean-Maurice-Josué.

== Life ==
The son of Jacques-Hyacinthe Dubois Berthelot and Péronelle de Magnan, he was born in the chateau de Bois Berthelot at Canihuel in France and joined the French navy at the age of 20. In 1684, he was named midshipman. In 1687, he was discharged from the naval service and, the following year, became a lieutenant in the colonial regular troops of Canada. In 1689, he was charged with improving the defences of the town of Trois-Rivières due to the threat of attacks by the Iroquois. In 1692, Beaucours led a successful expedition against the Iroquois. Later that year, he drew up plans for the fortification of Quebec City against a possible English attack. He was subsequently given the post of engineer. In 1701, he was promoted to captain and, in 1702, went to work on forts in the Montreal area. In 1704 and 1705, he led a group of 120 men which took part in an expedition against the English in Newfoundland that culminated in the Siege of St. John's. On his return, Beaucours continued to work on fortifications at Montreal and Quebec City and, in 1712, he was awarded the cross of Saint-Louis and named chief engineer for Canada. Beaucours married Marie-Angélique Denys de La Ronde in 1713. In 1715, he was named chief engineer for the French colony on Île Royale and, in 1717, became king's lieutenant of Île Royale.

In 1730, he became governor of Trois-Rivières. Beaucours served in that post until 1733, when he was named governor of Montreal. He retired in 1748. Beaucours died in Montreal two years later.

During his life he owned 11 slaves.

== Legacy ==
Beaucours street in Sherbrooke was named in his honour. Les Maisons de Beaucours in Old Quebec were also named after Beaucours.
