= Bryant's Cove =

- Town
- Location of Bryant's Cove in Newfoundland
- Coordinates: 47°40′17.21″N 53°11′13.97″W
- Country: Canada
- Province: Newfoundland and Labrador

Government
  - Mayor: Chris Mercer

Area
  - Land: 4.88 km^{2} (1.88 sq mi)

Population (2021)
  - Total: 343
  - Density: 80.9/km^{2} (210/sq mi)
- Time zone: UTC-3:30 (Newfoundland Time)
  - Summer (DST): UTC-2:30 (Newfoundland Daylight)
- Area code: 709

Bryant's Cove is a town in the Canadian province of Newfoundland and Labrador, specifically near the Conception Bay region in the Avalon Peninsula area.

== Demographics ==
In the 2021 Census of Population conducted by Statistics Canada, Bryant's Cove had a population of 343 living in 142 of its 149 total private dwellings, a change of −13.2% from its 2016 population of 395. With a land area of 4.9 km^{2} (1.9 sq mi), it had a population density of 70.0/km^{2} (181.3/sq mi) in 2021.

== See also ==
- List of cities and towns in Newfoundland and Labrador
