= French Marines in Canada, 1683–1715 =

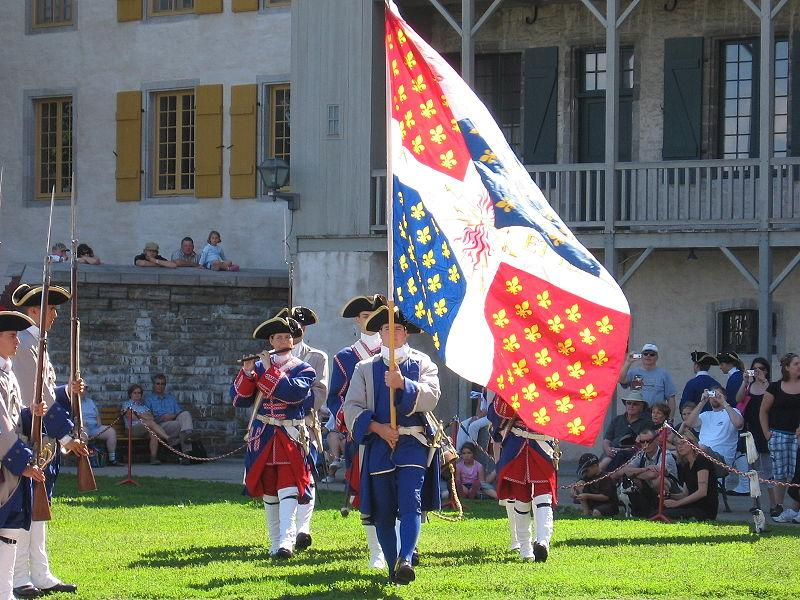
The Compagnies Franches de la Marine, were early French colonial marines serving in the Quebec region of New France portrayed by Canadian reenactors

The Troupes de la marine served in Canada during the period 1683–1715. The Marines were first sent to Canada in 1683 after an upsurge of Iroquois hostilities. The basic unit of the Marines in Canada was the company, with three or four officers, two sergeants, four corporals and lance-corporals, and a total complement of 33 to 52 officers and other ranks. The number of marines during the period peaked in 1688 with a total strength of 1,750 officers and other ranks. The other ranks were recruited in France, and were mostly volunteers, although Canada was not an attractive place to serve. Unskilled labourers dominated and almost a third of them came from the western parts of France. On the other hand, the officer corps was the subject of a gradual process of canadianization, with about a third of the officers serving in 1715 born in Canada.

== Background ==
The war with the Iroquois forced the French to deploy a regular army regiment to Canada in 1665. The additional military manpower of the Carignan-Salières Regiment tipped the scale in favour of the French, and the Iroquois sued for peace in 1667. By 1671 all regular army soldiers were back in France, or settled as colonists. When the Iroquois resumed hostilities ten years later, the colony was once again unable to defend itself in spite of the foundation of a militia system in 1669. The minister of marine, also in charge of the French colonies, therefore began to deploy Troupes de la marine to Canada in 1683.

== Organization ==
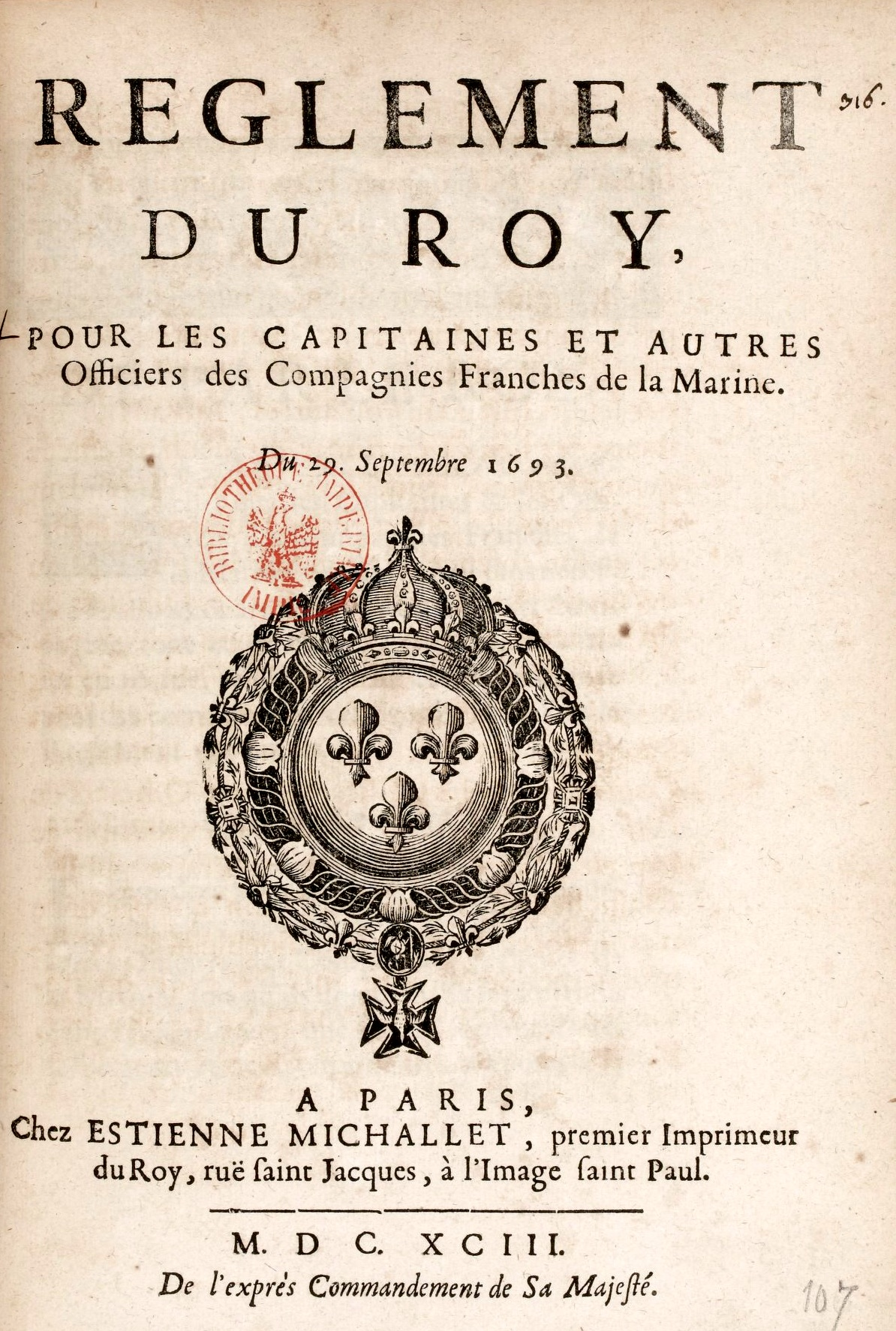
The King's regulations for captains and other officers of the marines were issued in 1693.

The object of the first troupes de la marine sent to Canada in 1683 was to defeat the Iroquois, and then return to France. La Barre's failed expedition against the Senecas in 1684 changed this, and from the following year the troupes became a permanent standing force in the colony, the colonial regular troops.

=== Table of organization ===
The basic structure of the compagnies franches de la marine, as the infantry of the troupes de la marine were called after 1690, remained unchanged between 1690 and 1761. Through the initiative of governor Denonville, the rank of second ensign was added to the complement in 1699, explicitly in order to recruit young Canadians of good families to the officer corps. Although the free companies per definition lacked a higher organization, a small staff existed above company level, containing a surgeon, a chaplain, a clerk of the muster, and a drum-major. In 1687 the rank of "commandant of the troops in Canada" was created, with a major as his chief of staff added to the organization in 1691.

Years	Captain	Lieutenant	Ensign	Second Ensign	Sergeants	Corporals	Lance-corporals	Drummer	Fusiliers	Total
1683–1686	1	1	0	0	2	3	3	0	42	52
1687–1698	1	1	1	0	2	3	3	1	41	53
1699–1715	1	1	1	1	2	3	3	0	22	33

=== Strength ===
The original 150 marines of 1683 increased the next year to 500, and with the arrival of governor Denonville, bringing an additional 300 men, reached a strength of 800 marines in 1685. Two years later an additional 800 marines arrived from France. In 1688 the required strength was 1,750 other ranks, although due to losses the actual strength was 1,418. The 35 substrength companies were consolidated to 28, with 50 other ranks in each. A reduction from 50 to 30 men per company took place in 1699, reducing the required strength to 840 other ranks.

Years	Number of companies	Number of officers	Number of non-commissioned officers, privates, and drummers
1683	3	6	150
1684	10	20	500
1685–1686	16	32	800
1687	32	96	1600
1688	35	105	1750
1689–1698	28	112	1400
1699–1715	28	112	840

The actual strength were always somewhat lower than the required strength. Officer's billets were always filled, but the actual number of private marines were almost always lower than the required strength. With the reduction of the number of companies from 1689, there were a small surplus of officers from the reduced companies, serving as extra officers.

=== Recruitment ===
Recruits had to be 20–30 years old, 158 cm (5 ft 2 in) tall, and fit for service. Single men were preferred. Most of the recruits were volunteers, but since service in Canada was not attractive, sometimes deception or violence was used to induce young men into the Marines. Wishing to avoid such chicanery, the government removed the height requirement and gradually lowered the age requirement until it was set at 15 in 1706. Catholic prisoners of war from Ireland and Scotland also became available for recruitment. When Canada urgently needed more marines, both deserters and civilian criminals, who had not been subject to corporal punishment, were released if they enlisted for military service in Canada. Sometimes prisoners were sentenced to serve in the Marines in Canada, something that hurt volunteer recruitment. From 1686, each newly raised company also included a veteran core of 14 non-commissioned officers and men from the Marine guards in French ports.

=== Pay ===
Rank	Monthly pay livre française	Monthly bonus livre française
Ship-of-the-line lieutenant, as Captain	83.4	50
Ship-of-the-line ensign, as Lieutenant	50	20
Ship-of-the-line ensign, as Ensign	50	15
Sergeant	22.10	0
Corporal	15	0
Lance-corporal	12	0
Fusilier	9	0

Stoppages were made from the pay for the uniform and for the extra blanket needed in the Canadian climate. Further deductions were for the pay of the drum major and the surgeon, and for keeping the muster-roll and maintaining the military hospital. Even the recruitment expenses were deducted. Sometimes the marines could work for the civilian population, or as officers servants, earning welcome additional income.

=== Quarters ===
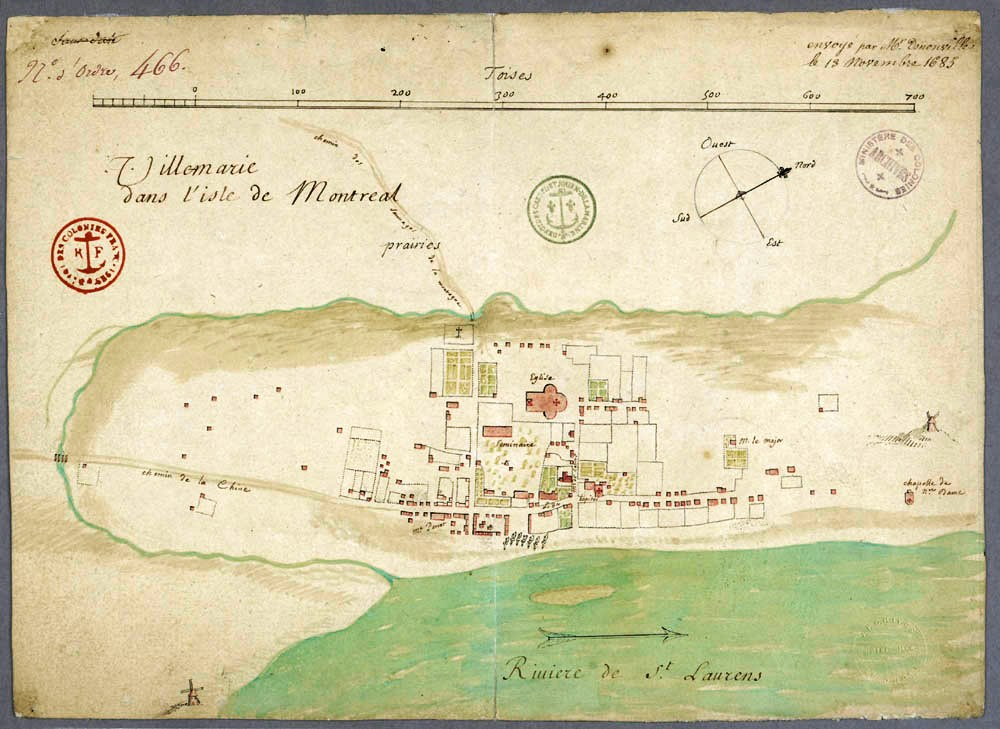
Most marines were stationed in or around Montreal.

Most of the marines were stationed in and around Montreal. A barracks housing 100 marines were built but most of the troops were in wintertime billeted with the inhabitants. In Quebec and Trois-Rivières the barracks was big enough to house the marines stationed in those towns. In summer the marines lived in tents.

== Campaigns ==
=== Drill and duties ===
The marines drilled with muskets twice a week, and practiced with grenades once a week. One marine from each company were selected for extended training in handling cannons, mortars and grenades. When trained, these marines were replaced by another set of marines. Standing guard was a perpetual duty, winter or summer. When living in tents in summertime, the marines were doing road work or working on the colony's fortifications. Transportation of goods to the Western posts, and of fur back to Montreal, was also the task of the marines. Military patrols on the large rivers and through the settled areas in search of hostile Indians were the most important military duty performed outside actual combat.

=== Major campaigns and engagements ===
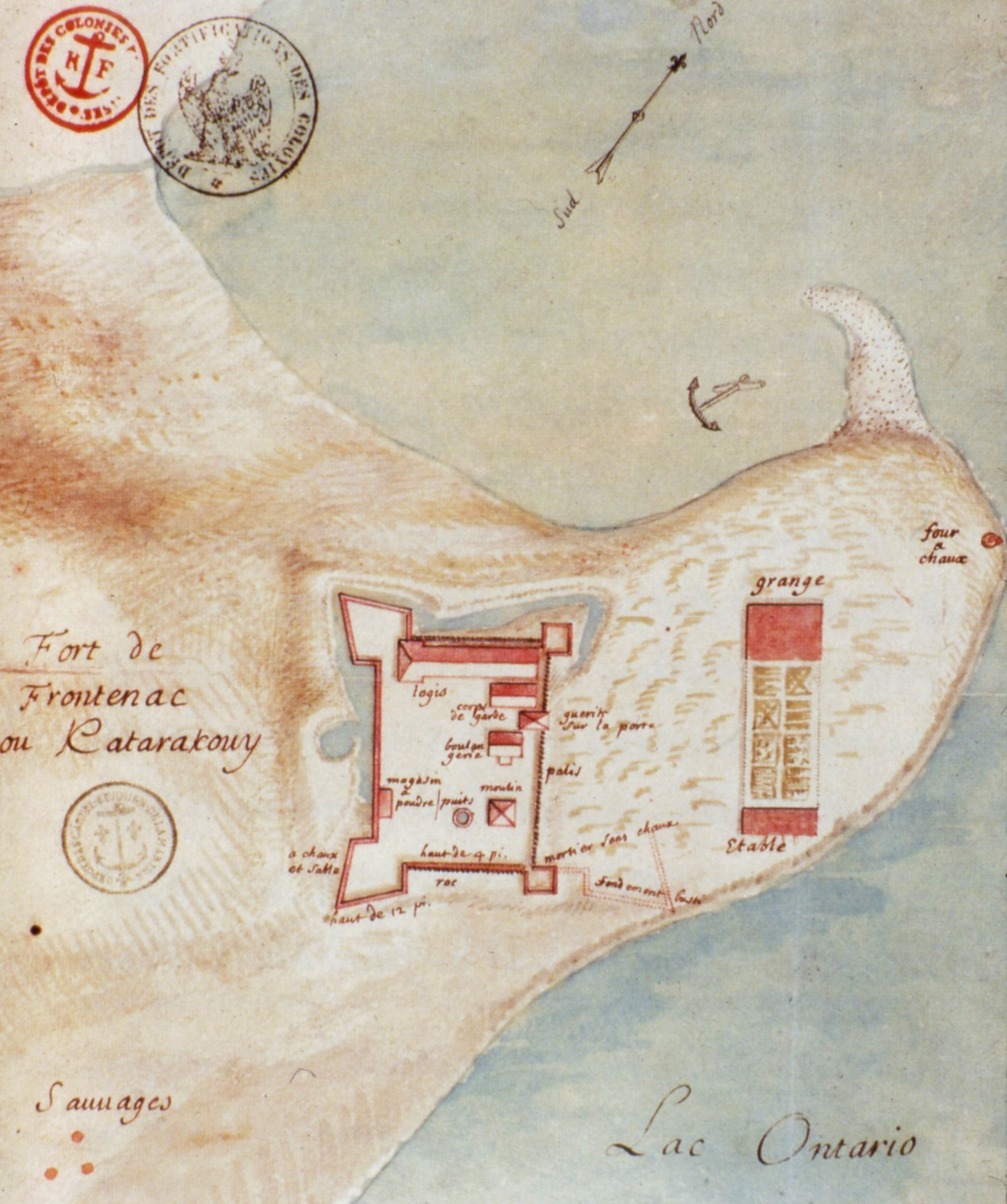
Fort Frontenac was garrisoned by the Marines during the Denonville expedition.

- La Barre's expedition against the Senecas, 1684.
- Troyes' Hudson Bay expedition, 1686.
- Denonville's expedition against the Senecas, 1687.
- Defence of Lachine against the Iroquois, 1689.
- Manthet's and Sainte-Hélène's expedition against Schenectady, 1690.
- Engagement on Lac des Chats with the Iroquois, 1690.
- Defence of Quebec against the English, 1690.
- Engagement at Îles-Bouchard with the Iroquois, 1691.
- Defence of La Prairie against the English, 1691.
- Engagement at Chambly against the English, 1691.
- Engagement on Lake Saint Francis with the Iroquois, 1692.
- Defense of Fort Verchères against the Iroquois, 1692.
- Manthet's and Courtemanche's expedition against the Mohawks, 1693.
- Frontenac's expedition against the Oneidas and the Onondagas, 1696.
- Iberville's expedition against Pemaquid, 1696.
- Iberville's Avalon Peninsula campaign, 1696–1697.
- The battle of Hudson's Bay, 1697.
- Beaubassin's New England campaign, 1703.
- Rouville's expedition against Deerfield, 1704
- Subercase's expedition against Newfoundland, 1705.
- Saint-Ovide's and Costebelle's expedition against Newfoundland, 1708–1709.
- Ramezay's expedition against the English at Lake Champlain, 1709.

== Social history ==
=== Social origin ===
The majority of marines in Canada had been unskilled labourers in civilian life. Yet, there were also skilled craftsmen among them, such as masons, carpenters, and tailors.

=== Geographical origin ===
Region	Marines with geographical origin registered in archival sources 1683–1715 N=1,508	Marines marrying in Canada 1683–1715 N=667	Captains 1683–1739 N=67
Brittany	11%	9%	7.5%
Normandy	8%	10%	7.5%
Paris, Île-de-France	9%	7%	28%
Loire: Anjou, Maine, Orleanais, Touraine	9%	8%	9%
North: Artois, Flanders, Picardie	2%	2%	1.5%
East: Alsace, Bourgogne, Bresse, Champagne, Franche-Comté, Lorraine, Lyonnais	5%	4%	7.5%
West: Poitou, Aunis, Saintonge, Angoumois	28%	32%	7.5%
Center: Limousin, Marche, Auvergne, Berry, Bourbonnais, Nivernais	6%	9%	8%
South-East: Languedoc, Roussillon, Dauphiné, Provence, Franche-Comté, Comtat Venaissin	4%	4%	10.5%
South-West: Guyenne, Gascony, Béarn, Rouergue	13%	14%	7.5%
Outside France	2%	2%	7.5%

=== Canadianization of the officer corps ===
Several factors led to a gradual canadianization of the officer corps. Young Canadians of good family were from 1699 encouraged to become officers in the marines. Retired marine corps officers settling in Canada, also sent their sons into the corps as cadets, although the formal rank of cadet was not introduced until 1731. A Canadian military elite emerged; already in 1690 a quarter of the officers were born in Canada, and in 1720 about half.

Year	Percentage Canadian-born captains
1683–1690	0
1691–1693	7
1694–1699	10
1700–1701	14
1702–1703	21
1704	14
1705	10
1706–1709	14
1710–1711	29
1712	32
1713–1714	29
1715	32

=== Integration and marriage ===
From 1683 to 1688, 35 marine companies of 50 soldiers each landed in the city of Quebec and were stationed in the three governments of Canada. Taking into account death and disability leave, at least 1,400 soldiers arrived into a New France which had no more than 11,000 inhabitants in 1685. Before 1715 a total of 3,000 to 3,500 marine recruits arrived in Canada. With the exception of 200 indentured servants that arrived 1684 and 1685, the marines were the only external additions to the population of Canada during the period 1683–1715.

Integration of the large number of marines arriving was aided by several factors. Canada lacked barracks and the marines were – like their predecessors of the Carignan-Salières Regiment – billeted on the people of the local community, especially during the cold season. Brought about by utter necessity, this probably constituted the principal element in the rapid integration of the marines into the host society.

Another factor favorable for integration was the two privileges granted the marines by the Intendant of New France, Jacques de Meulles, in 1685. One was the right for every marine to take work among the inhabitants of the country; the other authorized those who had a trade to practice it for 15 sous daily. The marines, who was paid 6 sous daily, but only had 3 sous left after stoppages, were happy to be able to work for 10-15 sous per day and food in addition, and the settlers and bourgeoisie were glad to be able to hire workers for less than was normally demanded. The captains of the marine companies were in their turn more than happy to give soldiers leave for work, as they then pocketed their military pay; an illegal but common practice.

In 1686 the King confirmed, that any soldier who wished to marry and become a settler cultivating uncleared land was to be released from service and during a year thereafter be paid as if he still was serving. In 1686, Governor Denonville released 100 marines from service and the following year another 48. King William's War and Queen Anne's War made the authorities less likely to grant early discharges for marriage, but they did not totally cease. A total of more than 700 marines married and settled in Canada.
