= Fort William, Newfoundland =

Former fort in St. John's, Newfoundland and Labrador, Canada

Coordinates: 47.5708°N 52.7006°W

Fort William
- St. John's, Newfoundland
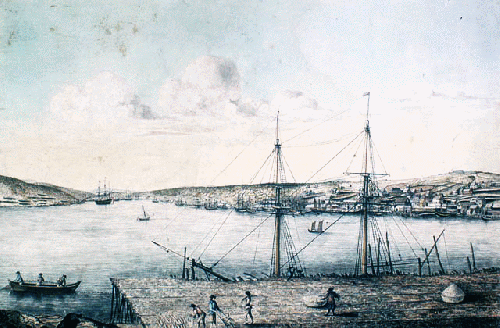
- View from Fort William

Site information
- Type: Fortress, garrisoned and armoured.

Site history
- Built: 1698
- In use: 1700 - 1871
- Battles/wars: King William's War 1689-1697; Queen Anne's War 1702-13; King George's War 1743-48; French and Indian War 1756-63

National Historic Site of Canada
- Official name: Fort William National Historic Site of Canada
- Designated: 1952

Garrison information
- Garrison: English

Fort William was a fort in St. John's, Newfoundland and Labrador, Canada. Built in 1698 to protect English interests on Newfoundland, primarily against French opposition, it was the original headquarters of the British garrison in Newfoundland. A second fort, known as Fort George was situated at the east end of the harbour connected by a subterranean passage with Fort William. On the south side of the Narrows, there was a third fortification called the Castle. Garrison headquarters were later moved to Fort Townshend, which was built between 1775-1779.

The Fort was demolished in 1881 to make room for a railway yard, the barracks being used as the station. This was demolished in 1910 and urban development now occupies the site.

Fort William was designated a National Historic Site of Canada in 1952. As there are no visible remains, the site is marked by a Historic Sites and Monuments Board plaque located on a retaining wall at the corner of Cavendish Square and Duckworth Street in downtown St. John’s

== Second and Third Anglo-Dutch War ==
The Second Anglo-Dutch War brought about a renewal of naval warfare with the Dutch Republic and Newfoundland. Meeting little opposition, a Dutch fleet captured St. John's in 1665, burning shipping and property on shore. Still without naval or military defences, the English merchants of St. John's did what they could for their own defence. After the Dutch attack Christopher Martin, a Devon merchant captain, built and maintained defensive batteries, King William’s Fort, at the entrance to the harbour at his own expense. Martin landed six cannon from his vessel, Elias Andrews, and constructed an earthen breastwork and battery near chain Rock commanding the Narrows leading into the harbour.

During the Third Anglo-Dutch War, in 1673 Martin, with fewer than thirty men, successfully defended the harbour from a second Dutch attack and a separate raid by four pirate vessels.

== King William's War ==
The accession of William III and Mary II in 1688 brought about a reversal of British foreign policy, but although war was formally declared with France in 1689, little was achieved to give the English in Newfoundland better security from attack. From the French stronghold of Placentia, the French had been making successful yearly assaults on the English settlements and fishing stations. The winter of 1696-1697 brought the most ambitious attempt to date by the French on the English settlements in Newfoundland in the Avalon Peninsula Campaign. This force, under the command of Pierre Le Moyne d'Iberville, destroyed all of the English communities on the Southern Shore without serious opposition, but, marching on St. John's, it was engaged. They then withdrew to the small fortification which had been prepared in the city, where they held out for a further 48 hours. They were forced to surrender the town and fort, which was burned to the ground.

This signal disaster, and especially the consternation it caused in New England, at last stimulated the British government to provide a permanent defence force for the island. A strong British relief force of 1500 troops reoccupied St. John's in the summer of 1697: they found the town abandoned, pillaged and every building destroyed. That winter, 214 of 300 soldiers perished due to lack of provisions and shelter. The following year construction was begun on a well-engineered fortification - Fort William - which, when completed in 1700, had brick-faced ramparts, bomb-proof parapets, powder magazines and proper barracks.

== Queen Anne's War ==
Peace had been established in 1697, but at the time of the accession of Queen Anne in 1702, war with France was renewed. In January 1705, St. John's was again attacked overland from Placentia. On this occasion, Daniel d'Auger de Subercase, the French commander, had a force of almost 500 regulars, French Canadians and Indians. He took the town, but the Fort William garrison held out and refused terms. After the five-week Siege of St. John's, Subercase retired to Placentia with all the booty his men and several hundred captive townspeople could carry. Sporadic attacks continued throughout 1706, despite British reinforcement of the St. John's garrison.

Yet another overland attack on St. John's by St. Ovide de Brouillon in January 1709 (Battle of St. John's), met with complete and immediate success. The British garrison, demoralised and badly led, surrendered the fort after only a brief resistance, and the French, taking upwards of 500 prisoners with them, withdrew to Placentia after destroying all the fortifications around the harbour. The following year the British began rebuilding Fort William and emplaced stronger armament, however, the garrison did not return and the fort began to fall into disrepair.

By 1712, British victories in Europe had brought about an armistice and, in the Treaty of Utrecht (1713), the French yielded all rights in Newfoundland to Britain.

== King George's War ==
Subsequently, the British fortifications in Newfoundland were neglected and fell into decay. Hence a major reconstruction was hastily begun in 1743 in the lead up to war with France. During King George's War (1744–48) although no military action occurred in Newfoundland itself, the British had maintained a strengthened naval force in the colony as a counter to the fortress then established by the French at Louisbourg in Cape Breton, and Fort William was completely rebuilt by 1749.

== The French and Indian War ==
The final military engagement in Newfoundland occurred in the fall of 1762 and was the final action in the Anglo-French war of 1756-63 known as Battle of Signal Hill. British victories at Louisbourg (1758), Quebec City (1759) and Montreal (1760) virtually eliminated the French presence in North America and led to the opening of peace negotiations under conditions of great disadvantage to France. Desperate to recover a bargaining counter, the French government dispatched a naval force with 800 troops to attack Newfoundland. Following earlier French-Canadian strategy, Comte d'Haussonville, the French commander, marched overland on St. John's from a landing in the undefended harbour at Bay Bulls. The British garrison in Fort William, few in numbers and without well-prepared defences, made no resistance and surrendered on June 17. The British Command in New York quickly organized a counterstroke. By September, 1500 regular and New England troops had been convoyed to the Avalon Peninsula and, on September 13, their commander, Lt. Col. William Amherst, made a landing at Torbay eight miles north of St. John's. Marching overland, Amherst drove the French from their outer defences at Quidi Vidi Pass and on the 15th captured the high ground of Signal Hill in a surprise dawn assault. With the French force now confined to Fort William, Amherst occupied the following two days bringing up heavy guns to reduce the fortifications: meanwhile the French warships which had convoyed d'Haussonville's force and which remained in St. John's harbour, escaped under cover of a thick fog. Amherst's batteries - one on the lower slope of Signal Hill and another north of the Fort on high ground along King's Bridge Road - were ready by the 17th and began an intensive bombardment of Fort William that day. Surrounded and unsupported, d'Haussonville's force capitulated on September 18.

== Demolition ==
Fort William was poorly situated and was not able to effectively protect the harbour or the settlement at St. John’s. Because of its location, it was vulnerable to land attack. Finally, in 1779, the British deemed Fort William to be too susceptible to attack and built Fort Townshend slightly further to the west. Fort William became a minor defence and one part of a larger system of forts and batteries that defended St. John’s and the harbours of Quidi Vidi and Torbay. In 1881, it was demolished and its site cleared to accommodate the Newfoundland Railway hotel and rail yard.

== Bibliography ==
- A Century of Armed Conflict in Newfoundland By Bernard Ransom Winter 1982
- Dull, Jonathan R. (2005). The French Navy and the Seven Years' War. University of Nebraska Press.
- National Historic Sites Directorate, Documentation Centre, 5th Floor, Room 89, 25 Eddy Street, Gatineau, Quebec
- Library and Archives Canada, Acc. No. 1996-381, MIKAN no. 2837123
- https://web.archive.org/web/20111113071023/http://www.therooms.ca/museum/
