= Queen Anne's War =

North American theater of the War of the Spanish Succession (1702–1713)

- Part of the War of the Spanish Succession and the American Indian Wars
- Map of European colonies in America, 1702
| Date | 8 March 1702 – 13 July 1713 (11 years, 4 months and 5 days) |
| Location | New England, Acadia, Canada (New France); Newfoundland; South Carolina, Florida; West Indies |
| Result | Peace of Utrecht; Treaty of Portsmouth |
| Territorial changes | France cedes to Britain the control of Acadia, Newfoundland, Hudson Bay, and Saint Kitts |

Belligerents
| France: New France; Spain loyal to Philip V: New Spain; Wabanaki Confederacy; Caughnawaga Mohawk; Choctaw; Timucua; Apalachee; Natchez | England (before 1707): English America; New England Colonies; Great Britain (after 1707): British America; Muscogee (Creek); Chickasaw; Yamasee | Haudenosaunee Confederacy |

Commanders and leaders
| (Spain) José de Zúñiga y la Cerda; (Kingdom of France) (New France) Daniel d'Auger de Subercase; (Kingdom of France) (New France) Philippe de Rigaud Vaudreuil; (Kingdom of France) (New France) Father Sebastian Rale; (Kingdom of France) (New France) Jean-Baptiste Hertel de Rouville | Joseph Dudley; James Moore; Francis Nicholson; (Kingdom of Great Britain) Hovenden Walker; (Kingdom of Great Britain) Samuel Vetch; Benjamin Church | Teganissorens; Peter Brant |

Queen Anne's War (1702–1713) was the second in a series of French and Indian Wars fought in North America involving the colonial empires of Great Britain, France, and Spain. In the United States, it is regarded as a standalone conflict. Elsewhere it is viewed as the American theater of the War of the Spanish Succession. It is also known as the Third Indian War. (Note: The first Indian War was King Philip's War, the second was King William's War, and the fourth was Father Rale's War. See Taylor (2005, p. 74)) In France it was known as the Second Intercolonial War.

== Outline of the war ==
The war broke out in 1701, a mere four years after King William's War, and was primarily a conflict between French, Spanish and English colonists for control of the North American continent while the War of the Spanish Succession was being fought in Europe. Each side was allied with various Indigenous communities. It was fought on four fronts:

- In the south, Spanish Florida and the English Province of Carolina attacked one another, and English colonists engaged French colonists based at Fort Louis de la Louisiane (near present-day Mobile, Alabama), with Indigenous bands allied on each side. The southern war did not result in significant territorial changes, but it resulted in seriously decimating the Indigenous population of Spanish Florida and parts of southern Georgia, with destruction of the network of Spanish missions in Florida.
- In New England, English colonists and Indigenous allies fought against French colonists and their Indigenous forces, especially in Acadia and unsettled border frontier with Canada. Quebec City was repeatedly targeted by British colonial expeditions, and the British captured in 1710 the Acadian capital Port Royal (modern Annapolis Royal). French colonists and the Wabanaki Confederacy sought to thwart British expansion into Acadia, whose border New France defined as the Kennebec River in what is now southern Maine. They executed raids in the Province of Massachusetts Bay (including Maine), most famously the Raid on Deerfield in 1704 and one on Groton in 1707, in both cases taking numerous captives to Montreal and Kahnawake (a Mohawk mission village) for ransom or adoption by Mohawk families.
- In Newfoundland, English colonists based at St. John's disputed control of the island with the French colonists of Plaisance, present-day Placentia. Most of the conflict consisted of economically destructive raids on settlements. The French colonists successfully captured St. John's in 1709, but the British colonists quickly reoccupied it after the French abandoned it.
- French privateers based in Acadia and Plaisance captured many ships from New England's fishing and shipping industries. Privateers took 102 prizes into Plaisance, second only to Martinique in France's American colonies. The naval conflict ended with the British capture of Acadia (Nova Scotia).

The Peace of Utrecht ended the war in 1713, following a preliminary peace in 1712. France ceded the territories of Hudson Bay, Acadia, and Newfoundland to Britain while retaining Cape Breton Island and other islands in the Gulf of St. Lawrence. Some terms were ambiguous in the treaty, and the concerns of various Indigenous communities were not included, thereby setting the stage for future conflicts.

== Background ==
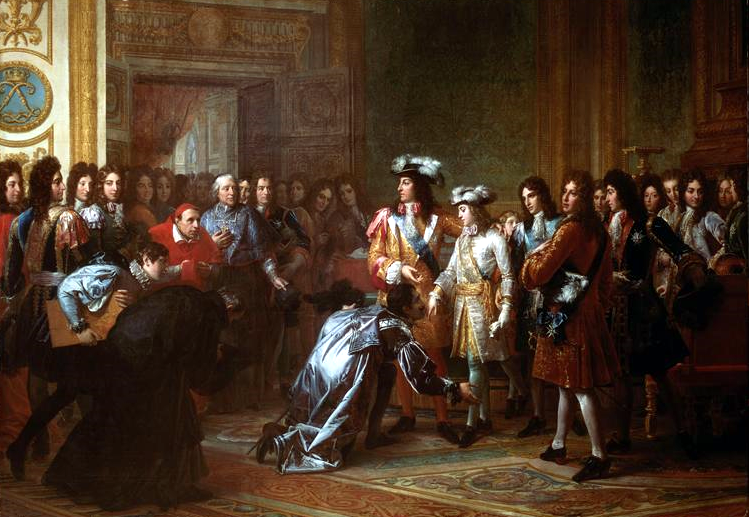
Philip of Anjou proclaimed as the King of Spain in November 1700. A dispute over his succession led to war between the Grand Alliance and the Bourbon alliance.

When war broke out in Europe in 1701 following the death of the last Habsburg monarch, Charles II, European powers disputed the succession. The zone of conflict was initially restricted to a few powers in Europe, but it widened in May 1702 when England declared war on Spain and France. Both the English and French wanted to keep their American colonies neutral, but they did not reach an agreement. The American colonists had their own tensions which had been growing along the borders separating the French and English colonies. They were concerned about boundaries and governing authority in the northern and southwestern frontiers of the English colonies, which stretched from the Province of Carolina in the south to the Province of Massachusetts Bay in the north, with additional colonial settlements or trading outposts on Newfoundland and at Hudson Bay.

The total population of the English colonies was about 250,000, with Virginia and New England dominating. The colonists were concentrated along the coast, with small settlements inland, sometimes reaching as far as the Appalachian Mountains. (Note: See Winsor (1887, p. 341), showing a 1687 map of the southeastern colonies) Colonists knew little of the interior of the continent to the west of the Appalachians and south of the Great Lakes. This area was dominated by numerous historic Indigenous communities, although French and English traders had penetrated it. Spanish missionaries in La Florida had established a network of missions in an effort to convert the Indigenous to Roman Catholicism and focus their labor. The Spanish population was relatively small (about 1,500), and the Indigenous population to whom they ministered has been estimated at 20,000.

French explorers had located the mouth of the Mississippi River, and they established a small colonial presence at Fort Maurepas near Biloxi, Mississippi, in 1699. From there, they began to build trade routes into the interior, establishing friendly relations with the Choctaw, a large community whose enemies included the English-allied Chickasaw. All of these populations had suffered to some degree from the introduction of infectious diseases such as smallpox, endemic among early explorers and traders. The Native Americans had no immunity and suffered high mortality.

The arrival of French colonists in the south threatened existing trade links that Carolina colonists had established into the interior, creating tension among all three powers. France and Spain, allies in this conflict, had been on opposite sides of the recently ended Nine Years' War. Conflicting territorial claims between Carolina and Florida south of the Savannah River were overlaid by animosity over religious divisions between the Roman Catholic colonists of New Spain and the Protestant English colonists along the coast.

To the north, the conflict held a strong economic component in addition to territorial disputes. Newfoundland was the site of a British colony at St. John's and a French colony at Plaisance, with both sides also holding a number of smaller permanent settlements. The island also had many seasonal settlements used by fishermen from Europe. These colonists numbered fewer than 2,000 English and 1,000 French permanent settlers (and many more seasonal visitors), who competed with one another for the fisheries of the Grand Banks, which were also harvested by fishermen from Acadia (then encompassing all of Nova Scotia and New Brunswick) and Massachusetts.

The borders and boundaries remained uncertain between Acadia and New England despite battles along the border throughout King William's War. New France defined the border of Acadia as the Kennebec River in southern Maine. There were Catholic missions at Norridgewock and Penobscot and a French settlement in Penobscot Bay near Castine, Maine, which had all been bases for attacks on New England settlers migrating toward Acadia during King William's War. The frontier areas between the Saint Lawrence River and the primarily coastal settlements of Massachusetts and New York were still dominated by Indigenous peoples, primarily Abenaki in the east and Haudenosaunee (Iroquois) west of the Hudson River. The Hudson River–Lake Champlain corridor had also been used for raiding expeditions in both directions in earlier conflicts. The threat of Indigenous peoples had receded somewhat because of reductions in the population as a result of disease and the last war, but they still posed a potent threat to outlying settlements.

The Hudson Bay territories (also known as Prince Rupert's Land) were not significantly fought over in this war. They had been a scene of much dispute by competing French and English companies starting in the 1680s, but the 1697 Treaty of Ryswick left France in control of all but one outpost on the bay. The only incident of note was a French attack on the outpost of Fort Albany in 1709. The Hudson's Bay Company was unhappy that Ryswick had not returned its territories, and it successfully lobbied for their return in the negotiations that ended this war.

== Technology and organization ==
The colonial military technology used in North America was not as developed as in Europe. Only a few colonial settlements had strong fortifications at the start of the war, such as St. Augustine, Florida, Boston, Quebec City, and St. John's, Newfoundland, although Port Royal's fortifications were completed early in the war. Some villages and settlements were protected by wooden palisades, but many had little more than fortified wooden houses with gun ports through which defenders could fire, and overhanging second floors from which they might fire down on attackers trying to break in below.

Europeans and colonists were typically armed with smooth-bore muskets that had a maximum range of about 100 yards (91 m) but were inaccurate at ranges beyond half that distance. Some colonists also carried pikes, while Indigenous warriors either carried arms supplied by the colonists or were armed with weapons such as primitive tomahawks and bows. A small number of colonists had training in the operation of cannon and other types of artillery, which were the only effective weapons for attacking significant stone or wooden defenses.

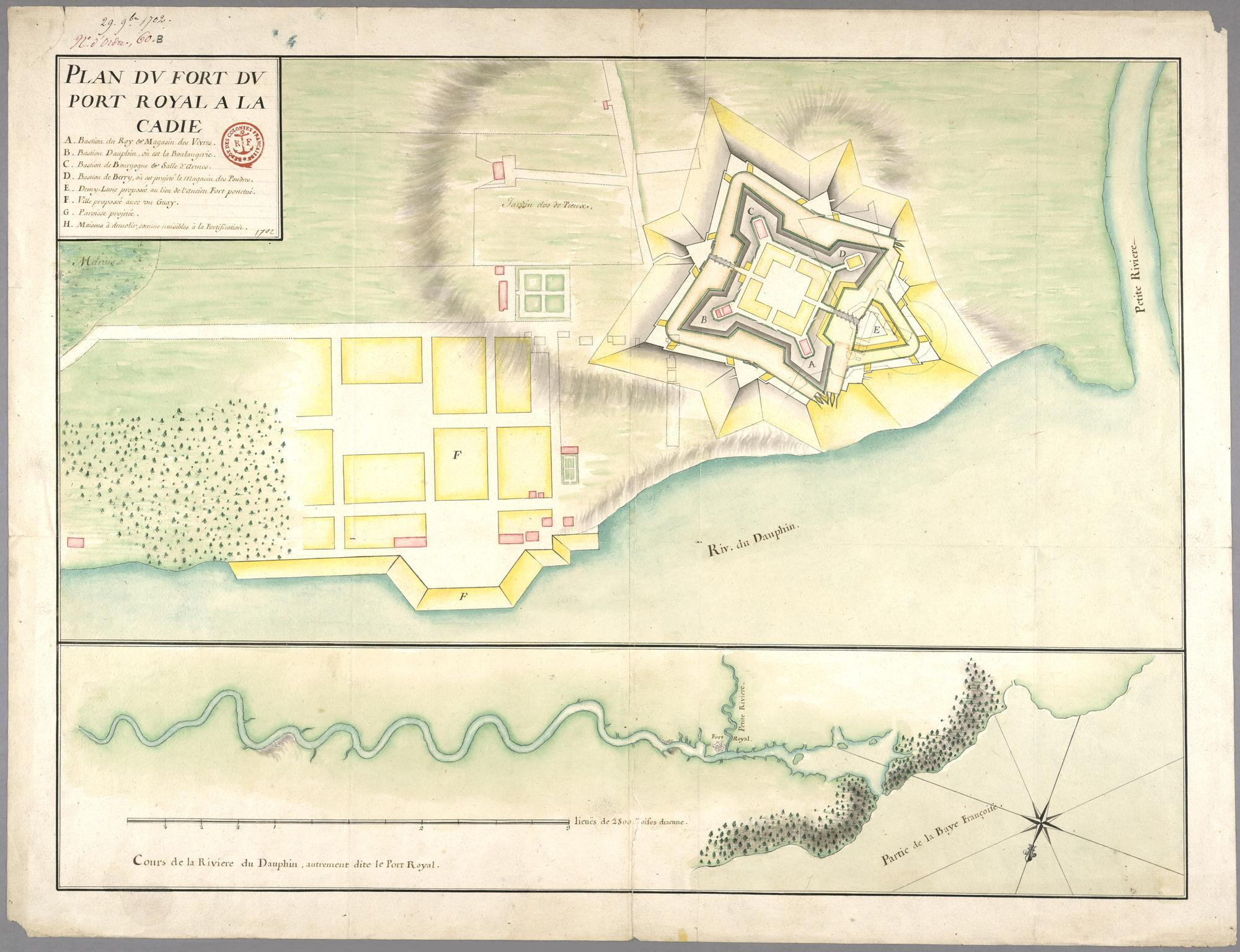
Fortifications of Port Royal, Acadia, (modern-day Annapolis Royal, Nova Scotia) 1702.

English colonists were generally organized into militia companies, and their colonies had no regular military presence beyond a small number in some of the communities of Newfoundland. The French colonists were also organized into militias, but they also had a standing defense force called the troupes de la marine. This force consisted of some experienced officers and was manned by recruits sent over from France, numbering between 500 and 1,200. They were spread throughout the territories of New France, with concentrations in the major population centers. Spanish Florida was defended by a few hundred regular troops; Spanish policy was to pacify the Indigenous peoples in their territory and not to provide them with weapons. Florida held an estimated 8,000 Indigenous peoples before the war, but this was reduced to 200 after English colonist raids made early in the war.

== Course of the war ==
=== Carolina and Florida ===
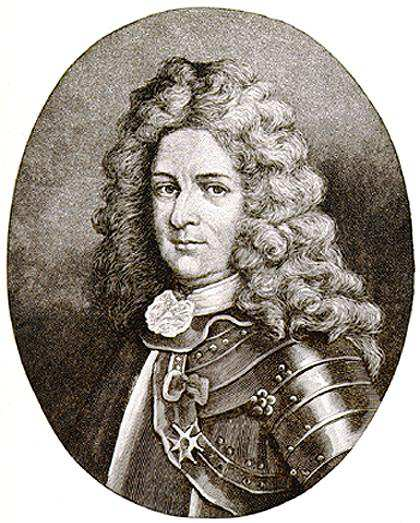
Pierre Le Moyne d'Iberville sought to establish a relationship with native people in the Mississippi watershed as a result of the last war with England.

Prominent French and English colonists understood at the turn of the 18th century that control of the Mississippi River would have a significant role in future development and trade, and each developed visionary plans to thwart the other's activities. French Canadian explorer Pierre Le Moyne d'Iberville had developed a "Project sur la Caroline" in the aftermath of the previous war which called for establishing relationships with Indigenous peoples in the Mississippi watershed and then leveraging those relationships to push the English colonists off the continent, or at least limit them to coastal areas. In pursuit of this grand strategy, he rediscovered the mouth of the Mississippi (which had first been found by La Salle in 1670) and established Fort Maurepas in 1699. From this base and Fort Louis de la Mobile (founded in 1702), he began to establish relationships with the local Choctaw, Chickasaw, Natchez people, and other communities.

English colonial traders and explorers from Carolina had established a substantial trading network across the southeastern part of the continent that extended all the way to the Mississippi. Its leaders had little respect for the Spanish in Florida, but they understood the threat posed by the French arrival on the coast. Both Carolina governor Joseph Blake and his successor James Moore articulated visions of expansion to the south and west at the expense of French and Spanish interests.

Iberville had approached the Spanish in January 1702 before the war broke out in Europe, recommending that the Apalachee warriors be armed and sent against the English colonists and their allies. The Spanish organized an expedition under Francisco Romo de Uriza; it left Pensacola, Florida in August for the trading centers of the Carolina back country. The English colonists had advance warning of the expedition and organized a defense at the head of the Flint River, where they routed the Spanish-led force, and captured or killed some 500 Spanish-led Indigenous peoples.

Carolina's Governor Moore received notification concerning the hostilities, and he organized and led a force against Spanish Florida. 500 English colonial soldiers and militia and 300 Indigenous peoples captured and burned the town of St. Augustine, Florida in the Siege of St. Augustine (1702). The English were unable to take the main fortress and withdrew when a Spanish fleet arrived from Havana. In 1706, Carolina successfully repulsed an attack on Charles Town by a combined Spanish and French amphibious force sent from Havana.

The Apalachee and Timucua of Spanish Florida were virtually wiped out in a raiding expedition by Moore that became known as the Apalachee massacre of 1704. Many of the survivors of these raids were relocated to the Savannah River where they were confined to reservations. Raids continued in the following years consisting of large Indigenous forces, sometimes including a small number of white men; this included major expeditions directed at Pensacola in 1707 and Mobile in 1709. The Muscogee (Creek), Yamasee, and Chickasaw were armed and led by English colonists, and they dominated these conflicts at the expense of the Choctaw, Timucua, and Apalachee.

=== Acadia and New England ===
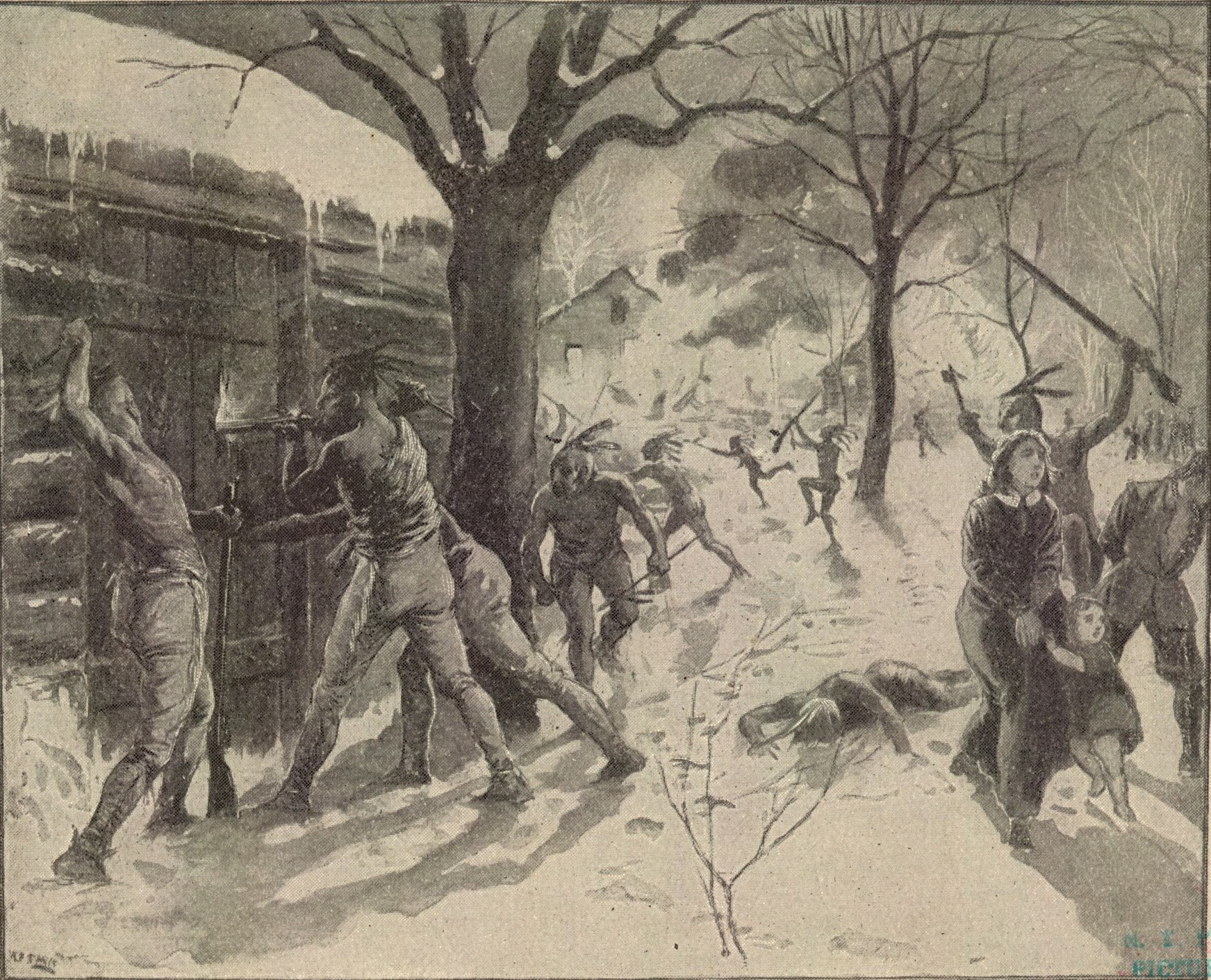
New French raid on Deerfield, Massachusetts, in February 1704

Throughout the war, New France and the Wabanaki Confederacy thwarted New England expansion into Acadia, whose border New France defined as the Kennebec River in southern Maine. In 1703, Michel Leneuf de la Vallière de Beaubassin commanded a few French Canadians and 500 Indigenous peoples of the Wabanaki Confederacy, and they led attacks against New England settlements from Wells to Falmouth (Portland, Maine) in the Northeast Coast Campaign. They killed or captured more than 300 settlers.

There were also a series of raids deep into New England by French and Indigenous forces aimed at securing captives. There was an active trade in captives, as families and communities struggled to raise ransoms to reclaim them. In February 1704, Jean-Baptiste Hertel de Rouville led 250 Abenaki and Caughnawaga Indians (mostly Mohawk) and 50 French Canadians in a raid on Deerfield in the Province of Massachusetts Bay. They destroyed the settlement, killing many and capturing more than 100 captives. These were taken on an overland journey hundreds of miles north to the Caughnawaga mission village south of Montreal. Most of the children who survived the journey were adopted by Mohawk families. Several adults were later redeemed (ransomed) or released in negotiated prisoner exchanges, including the minister, John Williams, who tried for years without success to ransom his daughter Eunice. She became fully assimilated, marrying a Mohawk man. Likewise in August 1704, there was a raid in Marlborough (in the part of town to later become Westborough), from which captives were also taken to Caughnawaga. There was an active slave trade of the captive colonists during these years, and communities raised funds to ransom their citizens from Indigenous captivity. For instance a captured boy, Ashur Rice, was returned to Marlborough after he was ransomed in 1708 by his father Thomas Rice.

New England colonists were unable to effectively combat these raids, so they retaliated by launching an expedition against Acadia led by the famous Indigenous fighter Benjamin Church. The expedition raided Grand Pré, Chignecto, and other settlements. French accounts claim that Church attempted an attack on Acadia's capital of Port Royal, but Church's account of the expedition describes a war council in which the expedition decided against making an attack.

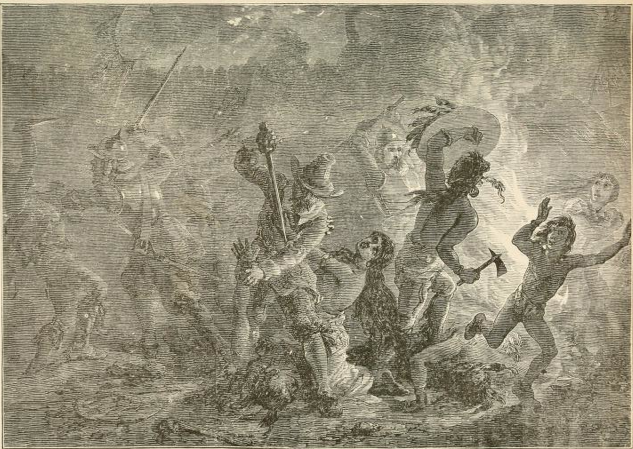
In June 1704, a force of 500 New Englanders raided the settlement of Grand-Pré, defended by the Acadian and Mi'kmaq militia.

Father Sébastien Rale was widely suspected of inciting the Norridgewock community against the New Englanders, and Massachusetts Governor Joseph Dudley put a price on his head. In the winter of 1705, Massachusetts dispatched 275 militiamen under the command of Colonel Winthrop Hilton to seize Rale and sack the village. The priest was warned in time, however, and escaped into the woods with his papers, but the militia burned the village and church.

French and Wabanaki Confederacy continued making raids in northern Massachusetts in 1705, against which the New England colonists were unable to mount an effective defense. The raids happened too quickly for defensive forces to organize, and reprisal raids usually found tribal camps and settlements empty. There was a lull in the raiding while leaders from New France and New England negotiated the exchange of prisoners, with only limited success. Raids by Indigenous peoples persisted until the end of the war, sometimes with French participation. (Note: See e.g. Drake (1910, pp. 286–287))

In May 1707, Governor Dudley organized an expedition to take Port Royal led by John March. However, 1,600 men failed to take the fort by siege, and a follow-up expedition in August was also repulsed. In response, the French developed an ambitious plan to raid most of the New Hampshire settlements on the Piscataqua River. However, much of the Indigenous support needed never materialized, and the Massachusetts town of Haverhill was raided instead. In 1709, New France governor Philippe de Rigaud Vaudreuil reported that two-thirds of the fields north of Boston were untended because of French and Indigenous raids. French–Indigenous war parties were returning without prisoners because the New England colonists stayed in their forts and would not come out.

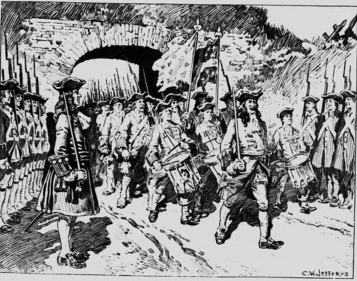
The evacuation of French forces from Port Royal after the English captured the settlement. The fall of Port Royal ended French control over the eastern peninsula of Acadia.

In October 1710, 3,600 British and colonial forces led by Francis Nicholson finally captured Port Royal after a siege of one week. This ended official French control of the peninsular portion of Acadia (present-day mainland Nova Scotia), although resistance continued until the end of the war. Resistance by the Wabanaki Confederation continued in the 1711 Battle of Bloody Creek and raids along the Maine frontier. The remainder of Acadia (present-day eastern Maine and New Brunswick) remained disputed territory between New England and New France.

=== New France ===
The French in New France's heartland of Canada opposed attacking the Province of New York. They were reluctant to arouse the Haudenosaunee, whom they feared more than they did the British colonists and with whom they had made the Great Peace of Montreal in 1701. New York merchants were opposed to attacking New France because it would interrupt the lucrative Indigenous fur trade, much of which came through New France. The Haudenosaunee maintained their neutrality throughout the conflict, despite Peter Schuyler's efforts to interest them in the war. (Schuyler was Albany's commissioner of Indians.)

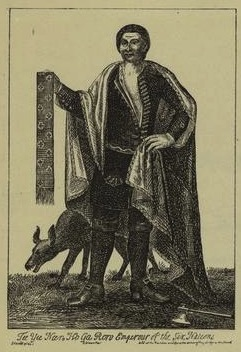
Hendrick Tejonihokarawa, a Mohawk chief, was successful in gaining support from Anne, Queen of Great Britain, to launch an expedition to take Quebec City.

Francis Nicholson and Samuel Vetch organized an ambitious assault against New France in 1709, with some financial and logistical support from the queen. The plan involved an overland assault on Montreal via Lake Champlain and a sea-based assault by naval forces against Quebec. The land expedition reached the southern end of Lake Champlain, but it was called off when the promised naval support never materialized for the attack on Quebec. (Note: Those forces were diverted to support Portugal.) The Haudenosaunee had made vague promises of support for this effort, but successfully delayed sending support until it seemed clear that the expedition was going to fail. After this failure, Nicholson and Schuyler traveled to London accompanied by King Hendrick and other sachems to arouse interest in the North American frontier war. The Indigenous delegation caused a sensation in London, and Queen Anne granted them an audience. Nicholson and Schuyler were successful in their endeavor: the queen gave support for Nicholson's successful capture of Port Royal in 1710. With that success under his belt, Nicholson again returned to England and gained support for a renewed attempt on Quebec in 1711.

The plan for 1711 again called for land and sea-based attacks, but its execution was a disaster. A fleet of 15 ships of the line and transports carrying 5,000 troops led by Admiral Hovenden Walker arrived at Boston in June, doubling the town's population and greatly straining the colony's ability to provide necessary provisions. The expedition sailed for Quebec at the end of July, but a number of its ships foundered on the rocky shores near the mouth of the Saint Lawrence in the fog. More than 700 troops were lost, and Walker called off the expedition. In the meantime, Nicholson had departed for Montreal overland but had only reached Lake George when word reached him of Walker's disaster, and he also turned back. In this expedition, the Haudenosaunee provided several hundred warriors to fight alongside the English colonists, but they simultaneously sent warnings to the French about the expedition, effectively playing both sides of the conflict.

=== Newfoundland ===
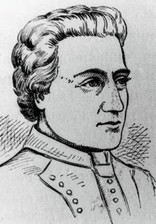
In 1705, Daniel d'Auger de Subercase, the Governor of Plaisance, led a French and Mi'kmaq expedition against English settlements in Newfoundland.

Newfoundland's coast was dotted with small French and English communities, with some fishing stations occupied seasonally by fishermen from Europe. Both sides had fortified their principal towns, the French at Plaisance on the western side of the Avalon Peninsula, the English at St. John's and in Conception Bay (see Carbonear Island). During King William's War, d'Iberville had destroyed most of the English communities in 1696–97, and the island again became a battleground in 1702. In August of that year, an English fleet under the command of Commodore John Leake descended on the outlying French communities but made no attempts on Plaisance. During the winter of 1705, Plaisance's French governor Daniel d'Auger de Subercase retaliated, leading a combined French and Mi'kmaq expedition that destroyed several English settlements and unsuccessfully besieged Fort William at St. John's. The French and their Indigenous allies continued to harass the English throughout the summer and did damages to the English establishments claimed at £188,000. The English sent a fleet in 1706 that destroyed French fishing outposts on the island's northern coasts. In December 1708, a combined force of French, Canadian, and Mi'kmaq volunteers captured St. John's and destroyed the fortifications. They lacked the resources to hold the prize, however, so they abandoned it, and St. John's was reoccupied and refortified by the English in 1709. (The same French expedition also tried to take Ferryland, but it successfully resisted.)

English fleet commanders contemplated attacks on Plaisance in 1703 and 1711 but did not make them, the latter by Admiral Walker in the aftermath of the disaster at the mouth of the St. Lawrence.

== Peace ==
European colonies in North America. Areas in purple were territories France ceded to England in the Peace of Utrecht, the peace treaty that concluded the war.

In 1712, Britain and France declared an armistice, and a final peace agreement was signed the following year. Under terms of the 1713 Peace of Utrecht, Britain gained Acadia (which they renamed Nova Scotia), sovereignty over Newfoundland, the Hudson Bay region, and the Caribbean island of St. Kitts. France recognized British suzerainty over the Haudenosaunee and agreed that commerce with Indigenous peoples farther inland would be open to all nations. It retained all of the islands in the Gulf of Saint Lawrence, including Cape Breton Island, and retained fishing rights in the area, including rights to dry fish on the northern shore of Newfoundland.

By the later years of the war, many Abenakis had tired of the conflict despite French pressures to continue raids against New England targets. The peace of Utrecht, however, had ignored Indigenous interests, and some Abenaki expressed willingness to negotiate a peace with the New Englanders. Governor Dudley organized a major peace conference at Portsmouth, New Hampshire (of which he was also governor). In negotiations there and at Casco Bay, the Abenakis objected to British assertions that the French had ceded to Britain the territory of eastern Maine and New Brunswick, but they agreed to a confirmation of boundaries at the Kennebec River and the establishment of government-run trading posts in their territory. The Treaty of Portsmouth was ratified on July 13, 1713, by eight representatives of some of the communities of the Wabanaki Confederacy; however, it included language asserting British sovereignty over their territory. Over the next year, other Abenaki tribal leaders also signed the treaty, but no Mi'kmaq ever signed it or any other treaty until 1726.

== Consequences ==
=== Acadia and Newfoundland ===
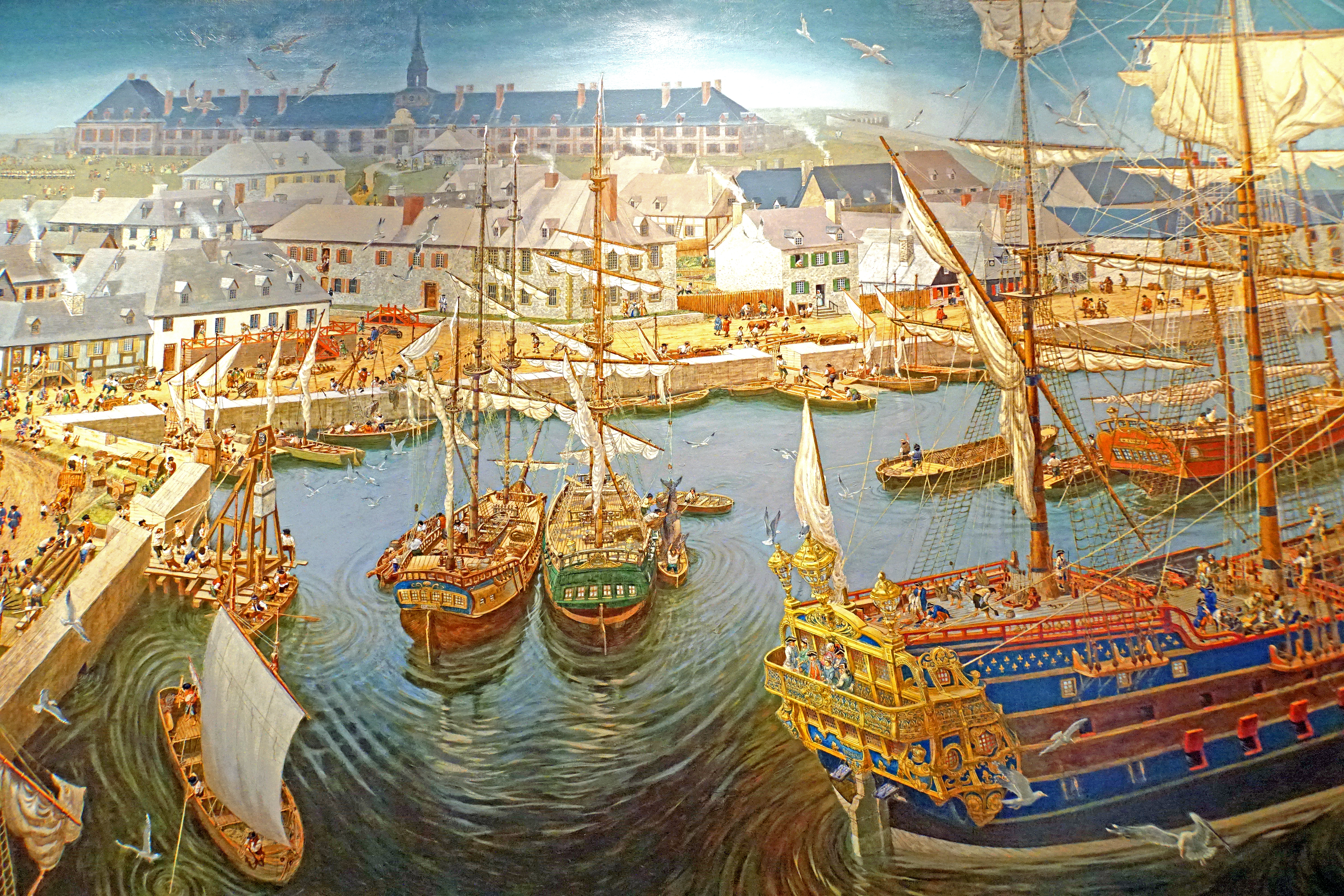
Shortly after the war, the French established the Fortress of Louisbourg. The fortified settlement was located to the north of the ceded Acadian territory, on Cape Breton Island.

The loss of Newfoundland and Acadia restricted the French presence on the Atlantic to Île-Saint-Jean (now Prince Edward Island) and Île-Royale (now Cape Breton Island). French were resettled there from Newfoundland, and France constructed the Fortress of Louisbourg in the following years. This presence plus the rights to use the Newfoundland shore resulted in continued friction between French and British fishing interests, which was not fully resolved until late in the 18th century. The economic effects of the war were severe in Newfoundland, with the fishing fleets significantly reduced. The British fishing fleet began to recover immediately after the peace was finalized, and they attempted to prevent Spanish ships from fishing in Newfoundland waters, as they previously had. However, many Spanish ships were simply reflagged with English straw owners to evade British controls.

The British capture of Acadia had long-term consequences for the Acadians and Mi'kmaq living there. Britain's hold on Nova Scotia was initially quite tenuous, a situation on which French and Mi'kmaq resistance leaders capitalized. British relations with the Mi'kmaq after the war developed in the context of British expansion in Nova Scotia and also along the Maine coast, where New Englanders began moving into Abenaki lands, often in violation of previous treaties. Neither the Abenakis nor the Mi'kmaq were recognized in the Peace of Utrecht, and the 1713 Portsmouth treaty was interpreted differently by them than by the New England signatories, so the Mi'kmaq and Abenakis resisted these incursions into their lands. This conflict was increased by French intriguers such as Sébastien Rale, and eventually they developed into Father Rale's War (1722–1727).

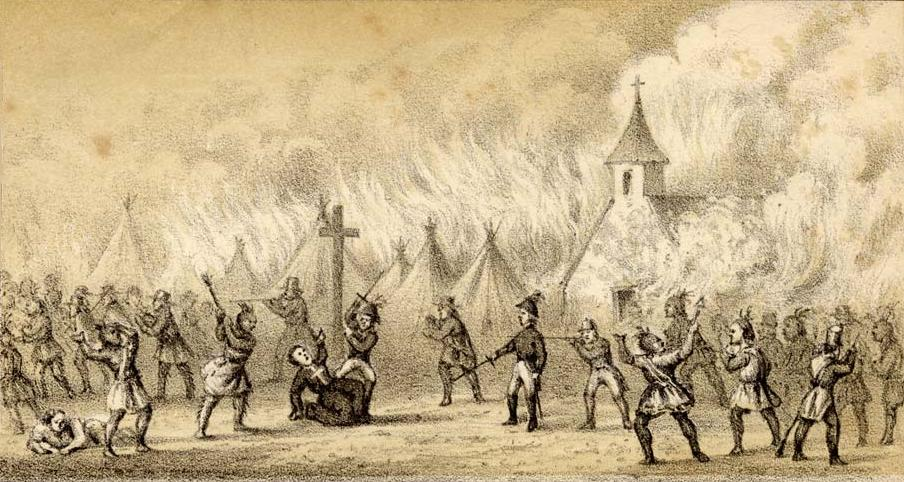
The Battle of Norridgewock during Dummer's War, August 1724. After portions of Acadia were ceded, the British faced resistance from Abenaki and Mi'kmaq tribes.

British relations were also difficult with the nominally conquered Acadians. They resisted repeated British demands to swear oaths to the British crown, and eventually this sparked an exodus by the Acadians to Île-Royale and Île-Saint-Jean (present-day Prince Edward Island). By the 1740s, French leaders such as Father Jean-Louis Le Loutre orchestrated a guerrilla war with their Mi'kmaq allies against British attempts to expand Protestant settlements in peninsular Nova Scotia.

Friction also persisted between France and Britain over Acadia's borders. The boundaries were unclear as laid out by the treaty, which even the French had never formally described. France insisted that only the Acadian peninsula was included in the treaty (modern Nova Scotia except Cape Breton Island) and that they retained the rights to modern New Brunswick. The disputes over Acadia flared into open conflict during King George's War in the 1740s and were not resolved until the British conquest of all French North American territories in the Seven Years' War. (Note: See e.g. Parkman (1897) for the later history of British-Acadian conflict.)

=== New England ===
Massachusetts and New Hampshire were on the front line of the war, yet the New England colonies suffered less economic damage than other areas. Some of the costs of the war were offset by the importance of Boston as a center of shipbuilding and trade, combined with a financial windfall caused by the crown's military spending on the 1711 Quebec expedition.

=== Southern colonies ===
Spanish Florida never really recovered its economy or population from the effects of the war, and it was ceded to Britain in the 1763 Treaty of Paris following the Seven Years' War. Indigenous peoples who had been resettled along the Atlantic coast chafed under British rule, as did those allied to the British in this war. This discontentment flared into the 1715 Yamasee War that posed a major threat to South Carolina's viability. The loss of population in the Spanish territories contributed to the 1732 founding of the Province of Georgia, which was granted on territory that Spain had originally claimed, as was also the case with Carolina. James Moore took military action against the Tuscaroras of North Carolina in the Tuscarora War which began in 1711, and many of them fled north as refugees to join their linguistic cousins the Haudenosaunee.

The economic costs of the war were high in some of the southern English colonies, including those that saw little military activity. Virginia, Maryland, and Pennsylvania to a lesser extent, were hit hard by the cost of shipping their export products (primarily tobacco) to European markets, and they also suffered because of several particularly bad harvests. South Carolina accumulated a significant debt burden to finance military operations.

=== Trade ===
The French did not fully comply with the commerce provisions of the Peace of Utrecht. They attempted to prevent English trade with remote Indigenous communities, and they erected Fort Niagara in Haudenosaunee territory. French settlements continued to grow on the Gulf Coast, with the settlement of New Orleans in 1718 and other (unsuccessful) attempts to expand into Spanish-controlled Texas and Florida. French trading networks penetrated the continent along the waterways feeding the Gulf of Mexico, renewing conflicts with both the British and the Spanish. Trading networks established in the Mississippi River watershed, including the Ohio River valley, also brought the French into more contact with British trading networks and colonial settlements that crossed the Appalachian Mountains. Conflicting claims over that territory eventually led to war in 1754, when the French and Indian War broke out.

== Sources ==
- Arnade, Charles W (July 1962). "The English Invasion of Spanish Florida, 1700–1706". The Florida Historical Quarterly. 41 (1): 29–37. JSTOR 30139893.
- Bryce, George (1900). The Remarkable History of the Hudson's Bay Company. London: S. Low, Marston & Co. ISBN 978-0-665-26705-5. OCLC 11092807.
- Calloway, Colin (1991). Dawnland Encounters: Indians and Europeans in Northern New England. Hanover, NH: University Press of New England. ISBN 978-0-87451-526-8. OCLC 21873281.
- Campbell, W. E. (2005). The road to Canada: the grand communications route from Saint John to Quebec. New Brunswick military heritage series. Fredericton, N.B: Goose Lane Editions : New Brunswick Military Heritage Project. ISBN 978-0-86492-426-1.
- Chard, Donald F. (1965). "The Impact on French Privateering on New England, 1689–1713". The American Neptune. 35 (3): 153–165 – via HathiTrust.
- Cooper, William James; Terrill, Tom E (1999). The American South: A History, Volume 1. Lanham, MD: Rowman and Littlefield. ISBN 978-0-7425-6094-9. OCLC 227328018.
- Covington, James (1968). "Migration of the Seminoles into Florida, 1700–1820". The Florida Historical Quarterly. 46 (4, April): 340–357. JSTOR 30147280.
- Crane, Verner W (April 1919). "The Southern Frontier in Queen Anne's War". The American Historical Review. 24 (3): 379–395. doi:10.1086/ahr/24.3.379. JSTOR 1835775.
- Craven, Wesley Frank (1968). The Colonies in Transition: 1660–1713. New York: Harper & Row. OCLC 423532.
- Drake, Samuel Adams (1910) [1897]. The Border Wars of New England. New York: C. Scribner's Sons. OCLC 2358736.
- Eccles, William J (1983). The Canadian Frontier, 1534–1760. Albuquerque, New Mexico: UNM Press. ISBN 978-0-8263-0706-4. OCLC 239773206.
- Greene, Evarts Boutell (1905). Provincial America, 1690-1740. New York: Harper & brothers – via Internet Archive.
- Griffiths, N.E.S. (2005). From Migrant to Acadian: A North American Border People, 1604–1755. McGill-Queen's University Press. ISBN 978-0-7735-2699-0.
- Héroux, Denis; Lahaise, Robert; Vallerand, Noël (1967). La Nouvelle-France [New France] (in French). Centre de psychologie et de pédagogie.
- Higginbotham, Jay (1991) [1977]. Old Mobile: Fort Louis de la Louisiane, 1702–1711. Tuscaloosa: University of Alabama Press. ISBN 978-0-8173-0528-4. OCLC 22732070.
- Landry, Nicolas (2004-09-09). "Les activités de course dans un port colonial français : Plaisance, Terre-Neuve, durant la guerre de Succession d'Espagne, 1702-1713" [Racing activities in a French colonial port: Plaisance, Newfoundland, during the War of the Spanish Succession, 1702-1713]. Acadiensis (in French): 56–79. ISSN 1712-7432.
- Leckie, Robert (1999). A Few Acres of Snow: the Saga of the French and Indian Wars. New York: John Wiley. ISBN 978-0-471-24690-9. OCLC 39739622.
- MacVicar, William (1897). A Short History of Annapolis Royal: the Port Royal of the French, From its Settlement in 1604 to the Withdrawal of the British Troops in 1854. Toronto: Copp, Clark. OCLC 6408962.
- Marshall, Bill; Johnston, Christina (2005). France and the Americas: Culture, Politics, and History. Oxford: ABC-Clio. ISBN 978-1-85109-411-0. OCLC 264795152.
- Morrison, Kenneth (1984). The Embattled Northeast: the Elusive Ideal of Alliance in Abenaki-Euramerican Relations. University of California Press. ISBN 978-0-520-05126-3. OCLC 10072696.
- Newman, Peter C (1985). Company of Adventurers: The Story of the Hudson's Bay Company. Markham, ON: Viking. ISBN 0-670-80379-0. OCLC 12818660.
- Oatis, Steven J (2004). A Colonial Complex: South Carolina's Frontiers in the Era of the Yamasee War, 1680–1730. Lincoln, Neb.: University of Nebraska Press. ISBN 978-0-8032-3575-5. OCLC 470278803.
- Parkman, Francis (1892). A Half-Century of Conflict, Volume 1. Boston: Little, Brown. ISBN 978-1-4047-4737-1. OCLC 767873.
- Parkman, Francis (1897). Montcalm and Wolfe: France and England in North America, Volume 1. Boston: Little, Brown. OCLC 7850560.
- Parkman, Ebenezer (1906) [1769]. The story of the Rice boys captured by the Indians, August 8, 1704. Westborough Historical Society – via Internet Archive.
- Peckham, Howard (1964). The Colonial Wars, 1689–1762. Chicago: University of Chicago Press. OCLC 1175484.
- Plank, Geoffrey (2001). An Unsettled Conquest. Philadelphia: University of Pennsylvania Press. ISBN 978-0-8122-1869-5. OCLC 424128960.
- Pope, Peter Edward (2004). Fish into Wine: The Newfoundland Plantation in the Seventeenth Century. Chapel Hill: University of North Carolina Press. ISBN 978-0-8078-2910-3. OCLC 470480894.
- Prowse, Daniel Woodley (1896). A History of Newfoundland: from the English, Colonial, and Foreign Records. London: Eyre and Spottiswoode. p. 242. ISBN 978-0-665-51486-9. OCLC 3720917. "Moody."
- Reid, John; Basque, Maurice; Mancke, Elizabeth; Moody, Barry; Plank, Geoffrey; Wicken, William (2004). The 'Conquest' of Acadia, 1710: Imperial, Colonial, and Aboriginal Constructions. Toronto: University of Toronto Press. ISBN 978-0-8020-3755-8. OCLC 249082697.
- Rodger, N. A. M (2005). The Command of the Ocean: a Naval History of Britain, 1649–1815, Volume 2. W. W. Norton. ISBN 978-0-393-06050-8. OCLC 186575899.
- Shurtleff, Nathaniel Bradstreet (1871). A Topographical and Historical Description of Boston. Boston: Boston City Council. OCLC 4422090.
- Stone, Norman, ed. (1989). The Times Atlas of World History (Third ed.). Maplewood, NJ: Hammond. pp. 161, 165. ISBN 0-7230-0304-1.
- Taylor, Alan (2005). Writing early American history. Philadelphia: University of Pennsylvania. ISBN 978-0-8122-3883-9.
- Thomas, Alan Clapp (1913). A History of England. Boston: D. C. Heath. OCLC 9287320.
- Waselkov, Gregory A.; Hatley, M. Thomas (2006) [1989]. Powhatan's Mantle: Indians in the Colonial Southeast. University of Nebraska Press. ISBN 978-0-8032-9861-3. OCLC 266703190.
- Weber, David (1994). The Spanish Frontier in North America. New Haven: Yale University Press. ISBN 978-0-300-05917-5.
- Williamson, William D. (1832). The history of the state of Maine : from its first discovery, A.D. 1602, to the separation, A.D. 1820, inclusive. Vol. 2. Hallowell: Glazier, Masters & Co. – via Internet Archive.
- Winsor, Justin (1887). Narrative and Critical History of America, Volume 5. Boston: Houghton Mifflin. p. 318. OCLC 3523208. "Moore 1702 Augustine."
- Wright, J. Leitch Jr (1971). Anglo-Spanish Rivalry in North America. Athens: University of Georgia Press. ISBN 978-0-8203-0305-5. OCLC 213106.
