= List of Anglo-French conflicts on Hudson Bay =

The Anglo-French conflicts on Hudson Bay were a series of conflicts during the 17th and 18th centuries between England and France over control of the area surrounding Hudson Bay.

== Overview ==
Starting in 1672, the French sought to drive out the English Hudson's Bay Company (HBC) trading posts, which had been established on Hudson Bay beginning in 1668. The conflict continued during King William's War and largely ended in 1713, when France recognized British sovereignty over the Bay in the Treaty of Utrecht. The last notable conflict occurred in 1782, when the French captured Fort Churchill (Prince of Wales Fort).

Since the posts were held by, at most, a few dozen traders and labourers, they could easily be captured by a small group of soldiers; however, it was difficult to send soldiers to the Bay and impractical to keep them there over winter. The short ice-free season made it difficult to take all the posts in one year. Thus, the posts changed hands more or less at random whenever one side or the other sent a force into the Bay. Only in 1697 did significant British and French forces meet on the bay when the Battle of Hudson's Bay occurred.

== List of conflicts ==
=== Prior to 1670 ===
- 1658–68: Pierre-Esprit Radisson and Médard des Groseilliers learned that the best furs came from north of Lake Superior. When their plans were rejected at Quebec, they turned to the English.
- 1668–69: Proto-HBC trade operated for one winter at Rupert House. (See: Médard des Groseilliers.)

=== 1670s ===
- 1670: Hudson's Bay Company founded.
- 1670–79: English trading posts were built on James Bay, including:
  - 1668: Rupert House (southeast)
  - 1673: Moose Factory (south) and Fort Albany (west).
- 1672: Father Charles Albanel travels from Quebec to Rupert House but finds it deserted.
- 1674: Albanel again reaches Rupert House. He and Groseillers are sent to England. Father Albanel and French money induce Groseillers to return to French service.
- 1679: Radisson is in Paris.

=== 1670–1688 ===
- 1682: Radisson and Charles Aubert de La Chesnaye form the Compagnie du Nord.
- 1682: One French (which included Médard des Groseilliers) and two English groups reach the mouth of the Hayes River. The French capture the English.
- 1686: Hudson Bay expedition — A large French force from Montreal captures the three HBC posts on James Bay. The HBC now has only York Factory.
- 1688: Battle of Fort Albany — Pierre Le Moyne d'Iberville in the Soleil d'Afrique returns to James Bay to pick up the remaining furs. There, he defeats two English ships and returns to France.

=== King William's war (1688–97) ===
England's Glorious Revolution led to a renewed war with France that lasted nine years. Below is a list of incidents during the war:

- 1690: D'Iberville tries to capture York Factory but finds it guarded by a warship. He goes south and captures Fort Severn.
- 1693: James Knight captures Fort Albany and 30,000 pelts.
- 1694: Capture of York Factory — D'Iberville captures York Factory.
- 1695: Three Royal Navy frigates recapture York Factory. The French now hold no forts on the bay.
- 1697: Battle of Hudson's Bay — A naval battle takes place, after which d'Iberville retakes York Factory and France retains it until 1713.
- 1698: The war ends, and there seems to have been little action thereafter.

=== 18th century ===
- 1709: Battle of Fort Albany (1709) — During Queen Anne's War, about 100 French and Indigenous warriors attempted to capture Fort Albany but were repulsed.
- 1713: Treaty of Utrecht — France recognized the British claim to Hudson Bay.
  - After 1713, military competition was largely replaced by economic competition, as French and later other British traders attempted to divert trade from the HBC to Montreal. This continued until 1821, when the HBC absorbed the Montreal traders. In the interior, there were scattered conflicts involving traders and their Indigenous allies, but these left few records.
- 1763: Treaty of Paris — France ceded Canada to Britain.
- 1782: Hudson Bay expedition — Lapérouse successfully raided Prince of Wales Fort and York Factory.
