= Battle of Fort Albany (disambiguation) =

Battle of Fort Albany may refer to one of several battles that took place in and around what is now Fort Albany, Ontario. Once an outpost of the Hudson's Bay Company, the fort was the site of conflict before and during King William's War and Queen Anne's War:

- Hudson Bay expedition (1686), in which Fort Albany and other company outposts were captured by the French
- Battle of Fort Albany (1687), in which an English attempt to recapture the fort is repulsed
- Battle of Fort Albany (1693), in which the English recapture the fort
- Battle of Fort Albany (1709), a failed French and Indian attack against the fort
