= List of chief factors of Fort Albany =

This is a list of Chief Factors of Fort Albany, the men who governed the trading post at whose site the present-day Fort Albany First Nation was established.

Following the Hudson's Bay Company's rigid corporate structure, the original trading post of Fort Albany was run by a man with the title "Chief Factor", who oversaw the business of the fort (and consequently, the district). Some of the Chief Factors are listed below, along with the year of their appointment. The term "Governor" is sometimes used to refer to the employee overseeing the operations of the fort.

Term	Chief Factor	Notes	Ref
1682-1685	James Knight		
1686-1692	--	The French controlled the fort at this time.	
1692-1700	James Knight		
1700-1705	John Fullartine		
1705-1708	Anthony Beale	Returned to England in 1708 at his own request.	
1708-1711	John Fullartine		
August 1711	Henry Kelsey	Formerly Deputy Governor (i.e. Second); replaced Fullartine after his departure before Beale arrived the following month.	
1711-1714	Anthony Beale	Recalled in the aftermath of the Treaty of Utrecht as the Company re-oriented itself. Beginning in 1715, above the governor/chief factor of the fort, there seems to have been the position of "governor-in-chief" overseeing the whole region from York Factory.	
1714-1715	Richard Staunton	Recalled upon his own request in 1715, following the rejection of a pay raise, though he may have been abused by the "unruly men" at the fort.	
1716-1721	Thomas McCliesh	Returned to England in 1721.	
1721-1723	Joseph Myatt	Demoted in 1723 to Deputy Governor (i.e. Second) following a price drop caused by intervention of coureurs des bois and for teaching an indigenous boy to read and write.	
1723-1726	Richard Staunton		
1726-1730	Joseph Myatt	Served until his death from "gout of the stomach".	
1730-1737	Joseph Adams		
1735, 1736	Thomas McCliesh	Appointed in 1735, and then again in 1736, but was unable to take up his post at Albany both times due to illness and returned to England.	
1737-1739	Thomas Bird	Served until his death, believed to be "hastened by an immoderate use of liquors".	
1739-1740	Rowland Waggoner	Died before the orders for a three-year appointment as Chief Factor could reach Albany.	
1740-1747	Joseph Isbister	Established the first inland HBC post, Henley House. Had to relinquish his post due to illness.	
1747-1752	George Spence		
1752-1756	Joseph Isbister		
1764-1775	Humphrey Marten		
1775-1781	Thomas Hutchins		
1781-1790	Edward Jarvis		
1790-1791	John McNab		
1792	Edward Jarvis	Retired due to ill health.	
1793-1799	John McNab		
1800-1810	John Hodgson	Was in England for the 1807-08 year. Dismissed following much mismanagement of the fort and its subsidiaries.	
1810-1815	Thomas Vincent		
1821	Merger of the Hudson's Bay Company with the North-West Company		
1824-1826	Thomas Vincent		
1826-1829	Alexander Kennedy		^{:456}
1829-1830	Alexander McTavish	Chief Trader, no Chief Factor present	^{:456}
1830-1837	Jacob Corrigal	Chief Trader, no Chief Factor present	^{:457}
1830	Alexander Stewart	Governor George Simpson appointed Stewart to be Chief Factor, but on his journey to the fort he suffered a "slight paralytic affection" and was given leave of absence.	^{:461}
1837-1855	Thomas Corcoran	Chief Trader, no Chief Factor present. Departed in 1851–52 to receive medical attention.	^{:458, 461}
1855-	William H. Watt	Chief Trader, no Chief Factor present	^{:461}
-1858	John MacKenzie		^{:450}
1858-1860	William H. Watt	Chief Trader, no Chief Factor present. Given leave of absence in 1860.	^{:462}
