= D'Iberville =

D'Iberville, after Pierre Le Moyne d'Iberville, may refer to the following:

- D'Iberville, Mississippi
- D'Iberville High School, the town's local high school
- D'Iberville station, a station on the Montreal Metro
- D'Iberville (TV series), a Canadian television series

== Ships ==
- French cruiser D'Iberville, a torpedo cruiser launched in 1893
- French aviso D'Iberville, an aviso launched in 1935
- CCGS D'Iberville, a Canadian Coast Guard icebreaker
