= Capture of York Factory =

1694 Anglo-French conflict

Coordinates: 57°00′9.8″N 92°18′17.3″W

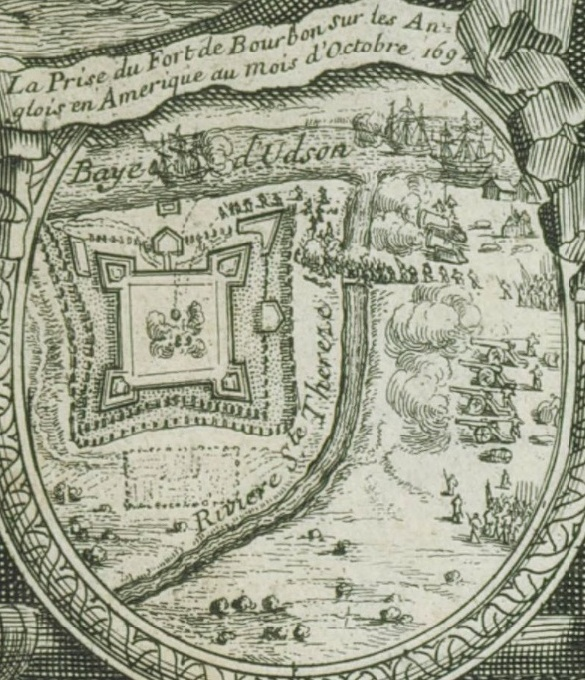
Capture of Fort Bourbon (York Factory) by the French in 1694.

The capture of York Factory was a 1694 Anglo-French conflict on Hudson Bay. In 1686. Pierre Le Moyne d'Iberville marched overland from Quebec City and captured all the trading posts of the English Hudson's Bay Company (HBC) on James Bay. This left York Factory, which was too far away and could only be reached by sea. In 1688 King William's War started and the needed ships were hard to get. In 1690 Iberville tried to take York Factory but was driven away by a larger English ship. In 1694, Governor Louis de Buade de Frontenac gave him the ships Salamandre and Poli. Iberville reached the Nelson River on 14 September. The fort was invested and on 14 October it surrendered. (The fort's residents consisted mainly of HBC traders, clerks and laborers and they had not brought in enough firewood to withstand a long siege).

Among the 53 men who surrendered was Henry Kelsey. The post was renamed Fort Bourbon. Since it was late in the season both the Canadiens and their captives had to spend the winter there. By the time the ice broke up many on both sides had died of scurvy. Iberville waited, hoping to capture the annual English supply ships. By September they had not arrived, so he left 70 men at the fort and sailed for La Rochelle with a valuable load of furs. Iberville's victory was nullified by two factors. In the previous year, the English had recaptured Fort Albany to the south on James Bay. Ten months after Iberville left three Royal Navy frigates under William Allen recaptured York Factory.
