= French ship Pélican (1693) =

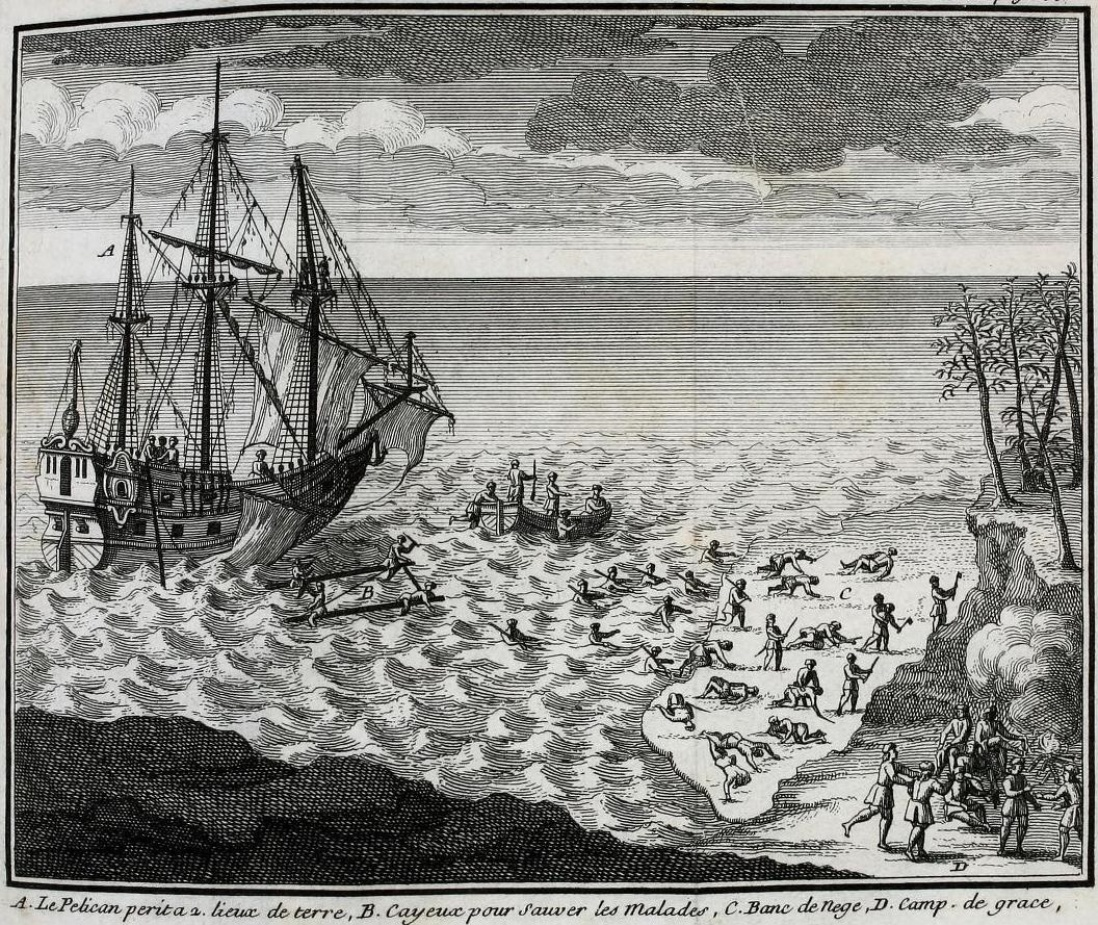
- Pélican sinking following the Battle of Hudson's Bay

History
- Name: Pélican
- Builder: Félix Arnaud, Bayonne
- Laid down: April 1692
- Launched: January 1693
- Commissioned: May 1693
- Fate: Sank after the Battle of Hudson's Bay 1697

General characteristics
- Class & type: Ship of the line (Vaisseau du troisième rang)
- Tons burthen: 500 tons
- Length: 118 feet (36 m)
- Beam: 32.5-foot (9.9 m)
- Depth of hold: 12.5-foot (3.8 m)
- Sail plan: Three masts
- Armament: 50 cannons, comprising 22 x 12pdrs, 20 x 8pdrs and 8 x 4pdrs

Pélican was a 50-gun ship of the line of the French Navy. Launched in Bayonne in January 1693, she was a 500-ton ship. Commanded by Ship-of-the-line Captain Pierre Le Moyne d'Iberville, she ran aground on the shores of Hudson Bay in 1697 several days after winning the Battle of Hudson's Bay, having been badly damaged by the battle and a fierce storm.

== History ==
=== Nine Years' War ===
Upon learning that the English were planning to maintain control of Hudson Bay, Louis XIV of France assembled a squadron of warships, consisting of Pélican, Palmier, Wesp and Profond. The goal was to recapture Fort Bourbon, as the French called York Factory, Manitoba, one of the centres of the North American fur trade.

Pélican set sail from France on 8 April 1697. On the morning of 5 September, temporarily separated from her sister ships, she came face to face with three English ships – Hampshire, Dering and Hudson Bay – which were carrying supplies to the nearby fort. Although they were outnumbered, the crew of the Pélican engaged in battle and triumphed. The French ship, however, was fatally damaged in the battle. With holes below the waterline, Pélican had to be abandoned; it was run aground on 8 September.

The French victory, later known as Battle of Hudson's Bay, was due in large part to the leadership of Captain Pierre Le Moyne d'Iberville. The battle resulted in Hampshire sinking, Dering retreating and Hudson Bay being captured with its cargo.

== Le Pélican (1992) ==
Three centuries later, an authentic replica of the Pelican was built in La Malbaie, Quebec. Construction began in 1987, but the project encountered many problems. In 1991, the architect François Cordeau was removed from the project management. The concept was then changed quite a bit. The wooden hull gave way to steel, up to the waterline. AML Naval Shipyard remade the ship's bottom. All sorts of other important changes reinforced the vessel. The ship was completed in 1992.

For two years, the Pelican II was in the Old Port of Montreal as a museum but it was sold to a Louisiana company in 1995.

The ship was placed in the port of New Orleans from 1995 to 2002. It was then moved to Donaldsonville, Louisiana, farther up the Mississippi River, where it became the property of the Fort Butler Foundation. It sank once in 2002 and was refloated. It was struck by a tugboat in 2004, and the city decided not to raise the ship. On 19 January 2008, a barge towboat struck Pélican II again. Fuel leaking from the towboat caused the river to be closed to boat traffic.

Half of the hull of the ship was made of metal, so that lifting her out of the water became a problem. Today not much is left of the ship except for a marker.

=== Photos during construction ===
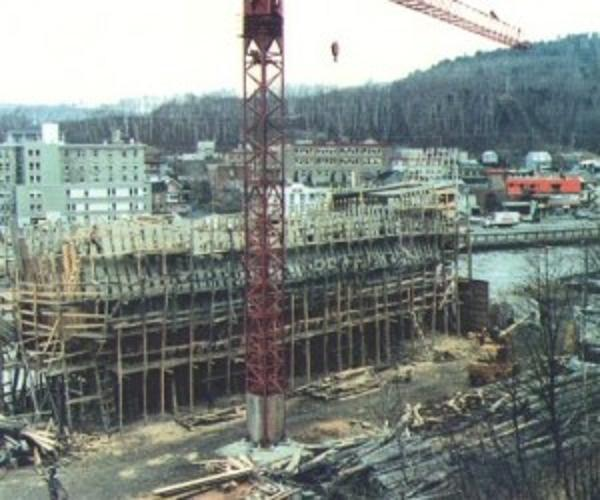
The Pelican under construction in 1990

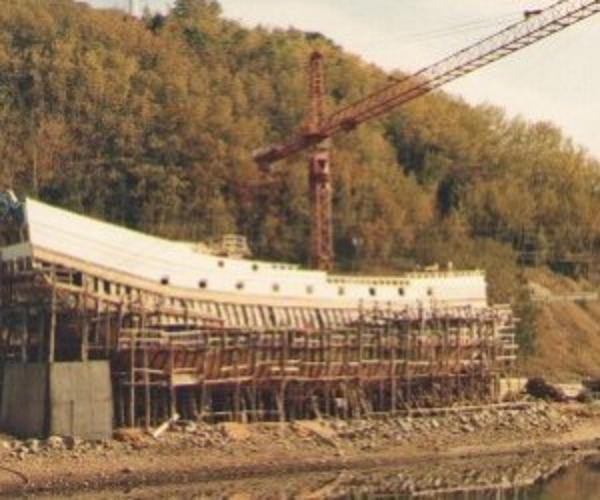
The Pelican under construction in 1991

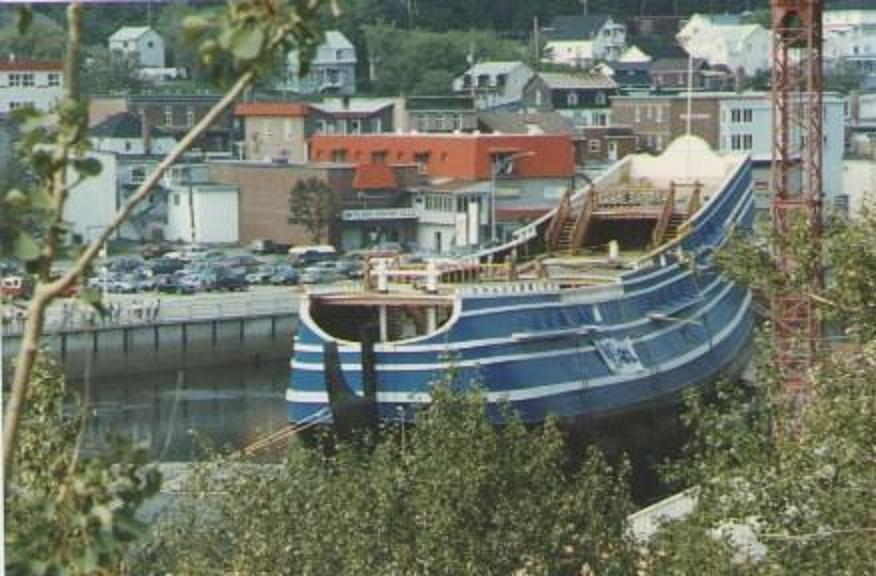
The Pelican under construction in 1992
