= Istrouma, Louisiana =

Unincorporated community in Louisiana

- Unincorporated community
- Location within Louisiana Location within the United States
- Coordinates: 30°28′45″N 91°09′35″W
- Country: United States
- State: Louisiana
- Parish: East Baton Rouge
- Elevation: 59 ft (18 m)
- Time zone: UTC-6 (Central (CST))
  - Summer (DST): UTC-5 (CDT)
- ZIP code: 70805
- Area code: 225
- GNIS feature ID: 543220
- FIPS code: 22-37690

Istrouma is an unincorporated community in East Baton Rouge Parish, Louisiana, United States. The community is located less than 2 miles (3.2 kilometres) northwest of Baton Rouge and 7 miles (11 kilometres) south of Baker.

== Etymology ==
It is speculated that the name of the community is derived from the Choctaw words 'ita humma' which means 'red pole' in the Choctaw language.

== Red Pole ==
On March 17, 1699 Pierre Le Moyne d'Iberville described the red maypole that he found in the area:

On the 17th of March we reached a small stream at the right of the river at five and a half leagues from our camp, where they gave us to understand there was a great quantity of fish, and where I had nets stretched and caught only two catfish. This river separates the hunting grounds of Bayougoulas and the Houmas. Upon its banks are huts covered with palmetto leaves and a reddened Maypole without branches, with several heads of fish and bears attached in sacrifice.

— Pierre Le Moyne d'Iberville
