= D'Iberville (TV series) =

- Genre: Adventure drama
- Written by: Guy Fournier; Jacques Letourneau; Jean Pellerin
- Starring: Albert Millaire
- Country of origin: Canada
- Original language: French
- No. of seasons: 1
- No. of episodes: 39

Production
- Producers: Pierre Gauvreau; Roland Guay
- Running time: 30 minutes

Original release
- Network: Radio-Canada; CBC Television
- Release: 7 October 1968 – 23 June 1969

D'Iberville is a Canadian adventure drama television series that aired on Radio-Canada in 1967 and 1968, and on CBC Television's English network from 1968 to 1969.

== Premise ==
The series is a dramatic portrayal of the adventures of Pierre Le Moyne d'Iberville (Albert Millaire) in the late 17th century when the British, Dutch and French were rivals for North American lands and the fur trade.

The initial episodes concern Lemoyne's early years when his father explored Lake Ontario, in the context of competition between Chevalier de La Salle and Sieur de LaBarre. In 1685, Jacques-René de Brisay de Denonville, Marquis de Denonville became governor of New France.

In the second phase of the series, episodes feature d'Iberville's early military career under the Chevalier de Troyes and the expeditions to Hudson's Bay and their capture of various forts in that region.

Finally, the series concludes with episodes featuring d'Iberville commanding naval troops during the New England Campaign near the beginning of the 18th century.

== Production ==
Radio-Canada produced D'Iberville in co-production with ORTF (France) and Radio-Télévision Belge (Belgium), Société suisse de radiodiffusion (Switzerland).

Episodes were filmed in colour at Île d'Orléans, Quebec with sets which resembled 17th century Quebec. The production featured a reconstruction of d'Iberville's ship, the Pelican. The cast featured 175 actors.

== Scheduling ==
This half-hour series was broadcast on CBC's English network on Mondays at 4:30 p.m. (Eastern) from 7 October 1968 to 23 June 1969. It was rebroadcast Saturdays at 1:30 p.m. from September to November 1969, and from February to March 1970. An English dub of the series was produced later.

This is D'Iberville, a making-of documentary of the series was produced by Brian O'Leary, It was broadcast on 7 August 1967 through CBC television.

== Cast ==
- Albert Millaire as Pierre Le Moyne d'Iberville
- Jean Besre as Paul Lemoyne, Sieur de Maricourt
- Alexandre Rigneault as Jacques Le Ber
- Jacques Monod as Joseph-Antoine de La Barre
- Francois Rozet as Charles le Moyne de Longueuil et de Châteauguay (d'Iberville's father)
- Gilles Pelletier as Jacques-René de Brisay de Denonville, Marquis de Denonville
- Yves Letourneau as La Salle
- Leo Ilial as Pierre de Troyes, Chevalier de Troyes.
