= Joseph Adams (businessman) =

British-Canadian businessman (c.1700–1737)

Joseph Adams (c. 1700 – 29 September 1737) was a British-born Canadian chief factor of the Hudson's Bay Company.

== Biography ==
Adams was born to William, a labourer, and Katherine Adams. He was baptized on 4 May 1700 in Woodford, Essex. His parish bound him on 1 June 1705 to serve the Hudson's Bay Company until age 24. Around this time, Adams was sent to Fort Albany, where he trained and learned the Cree language. In 1722, Adams' pay was increased to £16 per year, retroactive to 11 September 1721. He spent the 1723–24 season in England due to health issues.

When Adams returned to Fort Albany to continue working at the Hudson's Bay Company, he became Joseph Myatt's deputy from 1727 until Myatt's death on 9 June 1730, after which Adams took over as chief factor of the Hudson's Bay Company based at Fort Albany. Adams surveyed Moose River in July 1728 with William Bevan and also located the original site of Moose Factory, Ontario. The company's London committee told Adams to establish a factory at Moose in 1730, and despite reservations about their capabilities, he sent Thomas Render and John Jewer to build the post. He was later proven correct when the men at Moose refused to work under Render, forcing Adams to personally visit Moose in October 1731, to resolve the issue.

The Hudson's Bay Company hired Thomas McCliesh to replace Adams on two separate occasions, in 1735 and 1736. During both times, however, McCliesh was "sore afflicted with ailments" when he arrived, and had to return to England. On 26 December 1735, the Moose factory was destroyed by fire, and Adams wrote to the company's committee: "We have strained ourselves to the utmost to assist them." In 1737, Adams retired and was replaced at Albany by Thomas Bird. Adams died on 29 September 1737, shortly after returning to England with his three-year-old daughter Mary, whose mother was a Native Canadian. His will instructed that most of his estate be given to Mary in trust.
