= Battle of Hudson's Bay =

1697 naval battle of the Nine Years' War

Coordinates: 57°06′00″N 92°12′00″W

- Part of King William's War
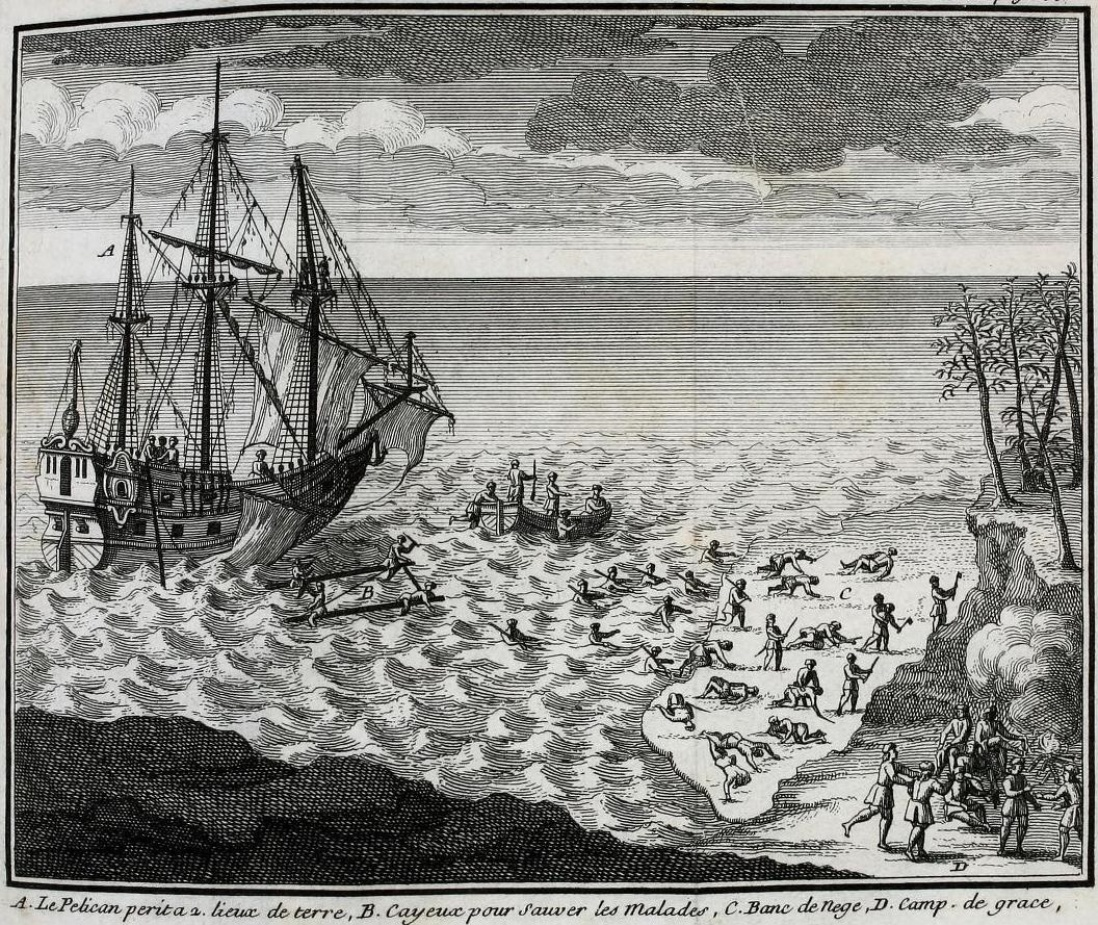
- The Sinking of the Pélican, Bacqueville de la Potherie
Date	5 September 1697
Location	off York Factory, Hudson Bay, Rupert's Land (present-day Manitoba, Canada)
Result	French victory

Belligerents
France	England

Commanders and leaders
Sieur d'Iberville	John Fletcher

Strength
1 ship of the line	1 ship of the line 2 frigates

Casualties and losses
1 ship of the line scuttled	1 ship of the line destroyed 1 frigate captured

The Battle of Hudson's Bay, also known as the Battle of York Factory, was a naval battle fought during the War of the Grand Alliance (known in England's North American colonies as "King William's War"). The battle took place on 5 September 1697, when a French warship commanded by Captain Pierre Le Moyne d'Iberville defeated an English squadron commanded by Captain John Fletcher. As a result of this battle, the French took York Factory, a trading post of the Hudson's Bay Company.

== Prelude ==
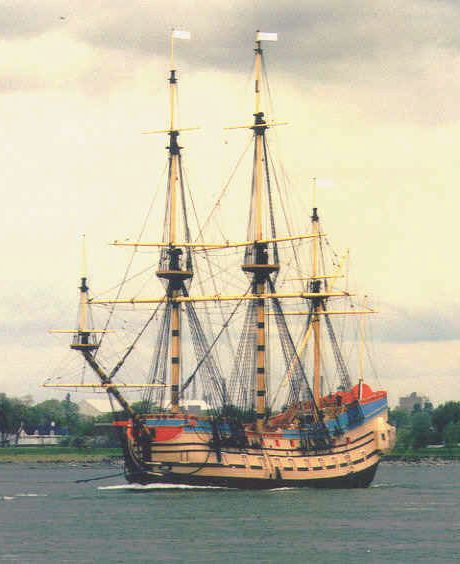
Replica of the Pélican

During King William's War, France several times sent forces to Hudson Bay to capture or destroy the fort. In 1690, Pierre Le Moyne d'Iberville tried but was driven away by a larger English ship. In 1694, d'Iberville returned and captured York Factory with a show of force; he renamed it Fort Bourbon. English naval forces returned the next year and retook the fort from its small French garrison.

In 1697, D'Iberville's flagship, Pélican (44-guns), was part of a larger French squadron dispatched to contest English control of Hudson Bay. D'Iberville commanded Le Pélican (50 [44] cannons, captain Pierre Le Moyne d'Iberville), a third-rate man-of-war cut for fifty guns, and with one hundred and fifty men ship's company. Serigny commanded the Le Profond (frigate/'storeship') (460 t, flûte de 32 canons [+2 from Le Pélican], commanded by Pierre Du Gué, Sieur de Boisbriand.). Boisbriant commanded Le Vesp/Weesph (frigate) (Capt. Chatrie (chevalier de Chastrier) a vessel of about 300 t with about 20–26 guns). Le Palmier (frigate) (fifth-rate man-of-war, 300t, captain Joseph Le Moyne de Serigny) a vessel of about 20–26 guns, and originally the "Violent" renamed L'Esquimau/Esquimaux (the Eskimo), a supply ship (150 ton brigantine) Jean Outelas, Capt., capable of carrying from 10 to 12 guns; one report says the last was crushed by the ice pack.

Before the battle, Pélican became separated from the rest of the French squadron in heavy fog, but D'Iberville elected to forge ahead. This set the stage for a little-known but spectacular single-ship action against heavy odds.

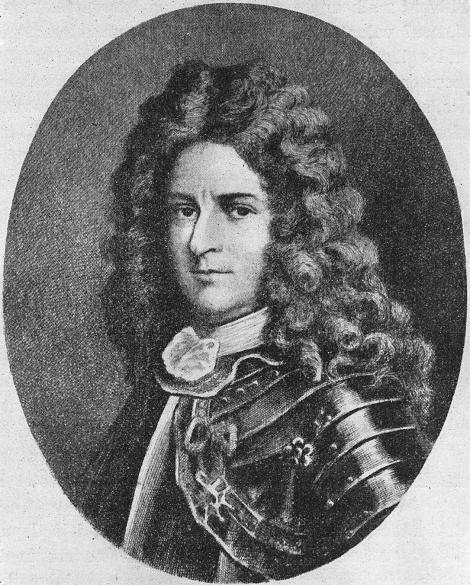
Pierre Le Moyne d'Iberville

As Pélican sailed south into clearer weather, she approached the trading post of York Factory, and a group of soldiers went ashore to scout out the fort. Captain D'Iberville remained on board Pélican. While the shore party was scouting the fort, D'Iberville saw the sails and masts of approaching ships. Thinking the rest of his squadron had arrived, he set off to meet them. D'Iberville realized that the ships were not French, but were, instead, an English squadron when one fired a shot across the bow of Le Pélican.

The English squadron comprised the warship Hampshire under Captain Fletcher, mounting 50 guns, HBC Royal Hudson's Bay (200 t) commanded by Capt. Nicholas Smithsend and mounting 32 guns, and HBC Dering (a third of this name owned by the HBC) (260 t) (Capt. Michael Grimington) mounting 36 guns. Fireship HMS Owner's Love (217 t) (Capt. Lloyd), which also joined the expedition, was crushed by ice earlier in the passage of the Hudson Strait.

== Battle ==
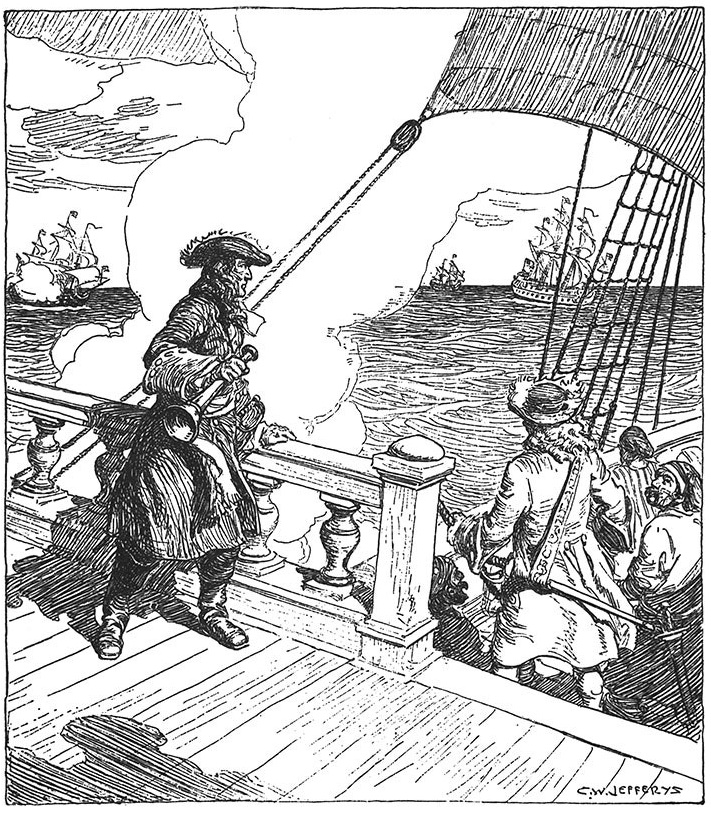
Iberville meets the English.

D'Iberville, his shore party out of reach, elected to give battle. The battle began as a running fight, but after two and a half hours, D'Iberville closed with the English and a brutal broadside-to-broadside engagement took place between Pélican and Hampshire. The English seemed to be gaining the upper hand with blood running from the scuppers of Pélican into the water. Captain Fletcher demanded that D'Iberville surrender, but D'Iberville refused. Fletcher is reported to have raised a glass of wine to toast D'Iberville's bravery when the next broadside from Pélican detonated Hampshire's powder magazine. Hampshire exploded and sank.

== Aftermath ==
Hudson's Bay and Dering seem to have played only a limited supporting role in the final stage of the engagement. Hudson's Bay was damaged and struck her colors to Pélican after Hampshire blew up. Dering broke off the engagement and fled, but Pélican was too badly damaged to pursue.

Pélican was also fatally damaged in the battle. Holed below the waterline, the ship had to be abandoned, but the arrival of the remainder of the French squadron shortly thereafter led to the surrender of York Factory on 13 September 1697, and the continuation of D'Iberville's remarkable career.

York Factory was held by the French until 1713, when it was returned to the British in the Peace of Utrecht.

== See also ==
- List of Anglo-French conflicts on Hudson Bay
