= Jacques le Moyne de Sainte-Hélène =

Canadian soldier

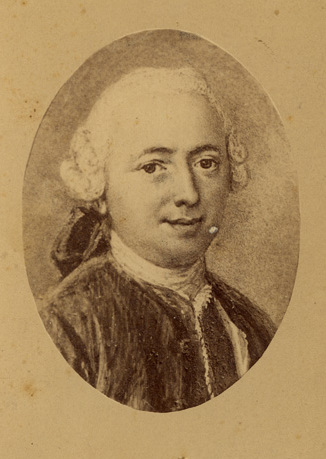
Jacques Le Moyne de Sainte-Hélène, vers 1690 (cropped)

Jacques Le Moyne de Sainte-Hélène (French pronunciation: [ʒak lə mwan də sɛ̃t elɛn]) was a Canadian soldier who was born on April 16, 1659, in Montréal. He was the son of Charles Le Moyne and Catherine Thierry. He died in Quebec City in 1690.

== History ==
In 1686, Jacques Le Moyne, with his brothers, Pierre Le Moyne d'Iberville and Paul Le Moyne de Maricourt, and the Chevalier de Troyes set out for the Hudson Bay to drive out the English, reclaiming it for France. The trip took 85 days up the Ottawa River, Lake Timiskaming, and Abitibi River. They and fourteen other men were successful in attacking a series of forts in the area, in effect, winning back the territory.

In 1687, he headed 300 Indians against the Senecas. The Governor of New France, the Marquis de Denonville made him lieutenant. In 1689 the Compagnie du Nord asked Jacques Le Moyne to try out a new route to Hudson Bay. He left with 38 men, as well as British ships, seized in Hudson Bay, and completed the trip in 28 days.

In 1690, Governor Louis de Buade de Frontenac counterattacked the English colonies with the raids made by the Iroquois incited by the English. Of the three expeditionary corps he raised, the Montreal detachment was led by Jacques Le Moyne and Nicolas d’Ailleboust de Manthet. The detachment was composed of 96 Canadians and 114 Frenchmen. In October of that same year, Le Moyne was posted as for the attack by William Phips. With accurate firing, two of Phips's ship retreated and tried to take refuge. The flagship was struck and leaking with many of its crew dead or wounded. Major Jown Walley was prevented from taking Québec City by gunners and by a detachment of men led by Jacques Le Moyne. However, Le Moyne was wounded in the leg, and the wound became worst after a few days. Sainte-Hélène was taken to the Hôtel-Dieu de Québec hospital where he died at the beginning of December 1690.

Jacques Le Moyne de Sainte-Hélène married Jeanne Dufresnoy Carion in Montreal. They had three children, one of whom, Jacques, made a career in Louisiana.
