= Battle of Fort Albany (1709) =

Coordinates: 52°15′04″N 81°30′04″W

- Part of Queen Anne's War
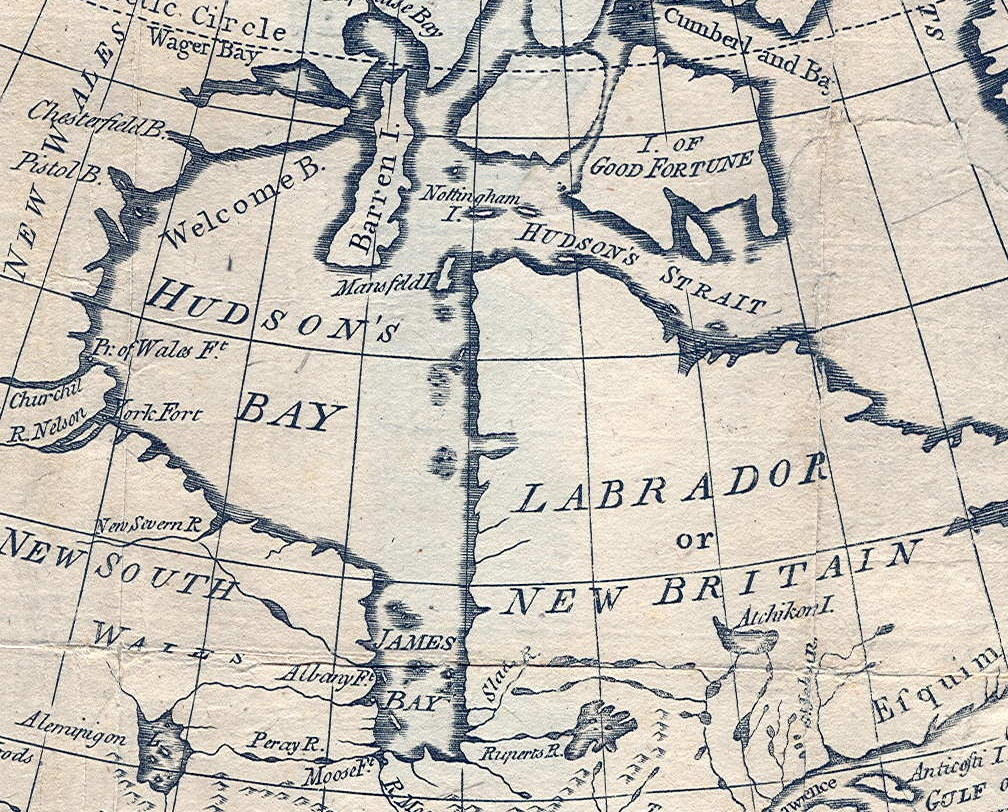
- Detail from a 1779 map of eastern North America. Fort Albany is visible near the bottom.
Date	26 June 1709
Location	Fort Albany, Prince Rupert's Land (present-day Ontario, Canada)
Result	British victory

Belligerents
(Kingdom of Great Britain) Great Britain	(Kingdom of France) France Mohawk warriors

Commanders and leaders
(Kingdom of Great Britain) John Fullartine	Nicolas de Manthet †

Strength
Unknown	70 French militiamen 30 Indians

Casualties and losses
2 killed	18 killed

The Battle of Fort Albany (about 26 June 1709) was an attack by French colonial volunteers and their native allies against the English Hudson's Bay Company outpost of Fort Albany in the southern reaches of Hudson Bay. About 70 Frenchmen and 30 Indians attacked the fort, which was under the command of John Fullartine. Fullartine's men repulsed the attack, killing eighteen attackers. He lost two men to ambush on their way back to the fort shortly after the attack.

== Background ==
Following the creation of the Hudson's Bay Company by English investors in 1670, a lucrative fur trade was established on the shores of Hudson Bay by the company. By the early 1680s the company had established several trading posts near the mouths of rivers entering into the bay, and Indians living in those watersheds would deliver their furs to these trading posts in exchange for provisions and European goods, including weapons, ammunition, and other items.

The success of this enterprise drew the attention of the authorities in New France, who objected to English encroachment on their claimed territories, and whose fur trade (and concomitant economic benefits) was hurt by the company's activities. Beginning with an expedition in 1686, and running through the Nine Years' War (1689–97, known in the English colonies as King William's War), raiders from New France repeatedly attacked the company's outposts, capturing and holding the facilities, and sometimes making off with furs awaiting transport to Europe. By the end of the war, only one of the company's outposts, Fort Albany (so named because it was located near the mouth of the Albany River in what is now far northern Ontario), remained in the company's hands.

When the War of the Spanish Succession (known to English colonists as Queen Anne's War) began in 1702, the idea of raiding this last vestige of English authority came up in New France. In 1709, a group of French colonists decided to launch an overland raid against Fort Albany. New France's governor, Philippe de Rigaud Vaudreuil, gave his blessing to the raid, and also helped fund the expedition from his private purse. The investors in the expedition expected to recoup their costs from the furs that would be taken. Command of the expedition was given to Nicolas d'Ailleboust de Manthet, an experienced frontier raider who appears, by the few surviving records concerning his life, to never have been to Hudson Bay before. Manthet recruited between 60 and 70 Frenchmen and 30 Caughnawaga Mohawk, and set out, went down the Moose River (Ontario), skirted the James Bay coast in canoes and arrived near Fort Albany in late June 1709.

== Battle ==
Fort Albany was inhabited by company employees under the direction of John Fullartine, a longtime company employee who had spent time as a prisoner of the French in the earlier raids. Fullartine was alerted to the French expedition by Cree traders, and thus had time to prepare a defense; the number of defenders and the exact date of the event are not known from the fragmentary records of the event.

All that is known of the French attack is that it was successfully repulsed, and that both Manthet and his second in command were killed. French casualties totalled 18 killed (including the two leaders), while the company lost only two men. They had not been in the fort and were ambushed by the French as they made their way toward it.

== Aftermath ==
Because the company did not send a ship to Fort Albany in 1709, officials in London learned of the event through an unexpected channel. Francis Nicholson, who had led an aborted expedition against New France from New York in 1709, brought one Mahican and three Mohawk chiefs to London in a bid to gain support for a new expedition in 1710. The Mohawks informed company officials that they learned of the attack because they were in Montreal at the time of the expedition's return. Fullartine filed a report on the event when he returned to England in 1711, but it has been lost.

Governor Vaudreuil was criticized by government ministers in Paris for his role in supporting and funding the expedition. The Hudson's Bay Company recovered all of its outposts in the 1713 Treaty of Utrecht that ended the war, but France and Great Britain continued to dispute the extent of French and company territories in the following decades.
