= Pierre de Troyes, Chevalier de Troyes =

Pierre de Troyes Chevalier de Troyes
- Born: Pierre de Troyes; February 17, 1633
- Died: May 8, 1688 (aged 55); Fort Denonville
- Burial place: Fort Denoville
- Spouse: Marie Petit de L'Estang
- Military career
- Allegiance: (Kingdom of France) France
- Branch: Régiment de Piémont; French Marines in Canada
- Rank: Captain
- Nickname: Pierry
- Conflicts: King William's War: Hudson Bay expedition 1686

Pierre de Troyes (born at unknown date – died 1688) was a captain that led the French capture of Moose Factory, Rupert House, and Fort Albany on Hudson Bay 1686.

== Arrival in Canada ==
A captain in the French army de Troyes arrived at Quebec in August 1685 with reinforcements for the colony. On 20 March 1686, with a party of twenty Troupes de la Marine (marines) and sixty Canadien militiamen (selected for their canoeing skills) out of Montreal, he led a mission to chase the English from James Bay (then known as the bottom of Hudson Bay). Among his officers were three Le Moyne brothers, Pierre, Jacques, and Paul. They were divided into three groups and headed to their destination using the interior waterways.

== Hudson Bay Expedition ==
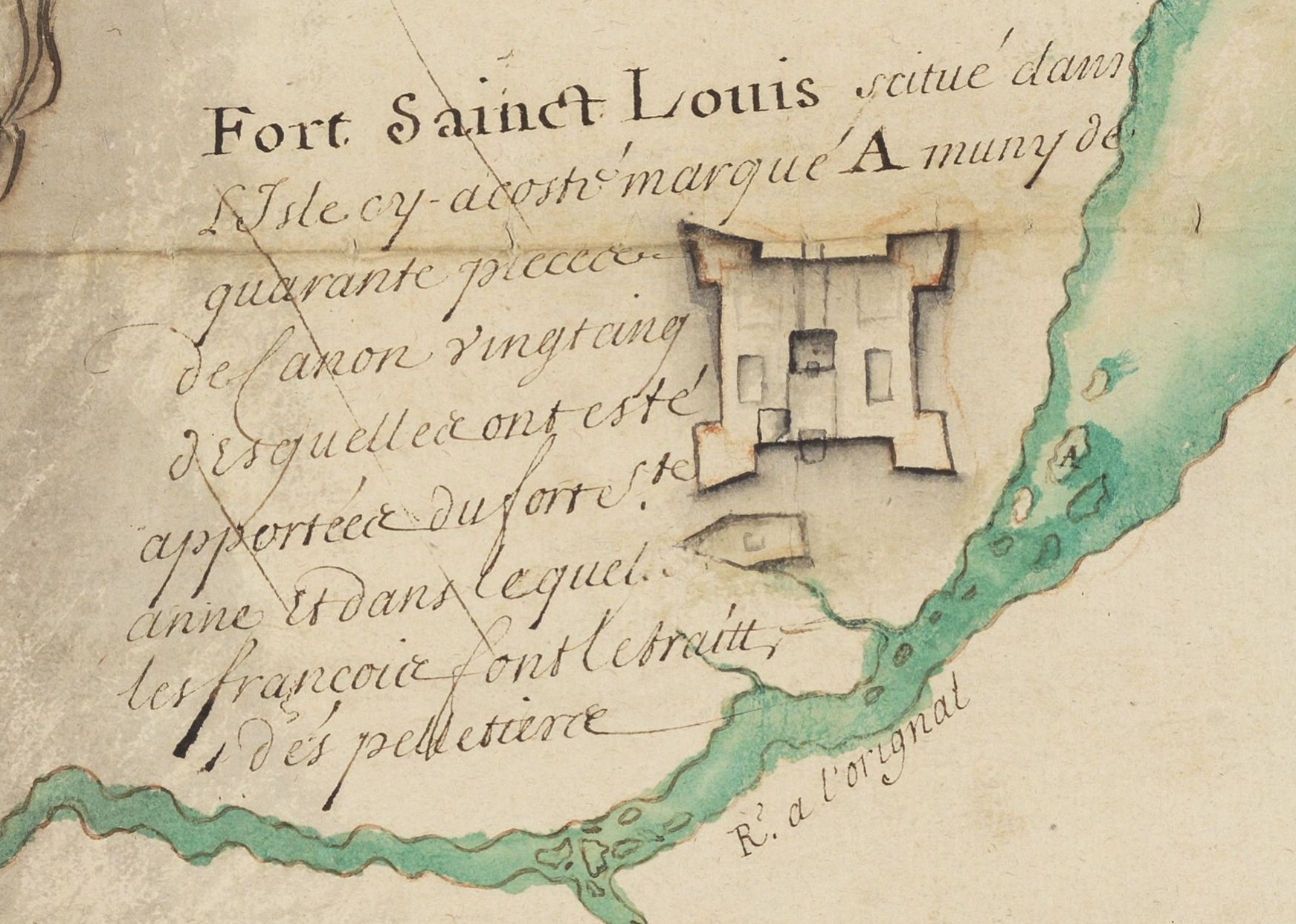
Moose Factory, known as Fort St-Louis, after its capture by the French under de Troyes; it was recaptured by the British in 1696

The mission made audacious use of canoes for transportation in voyageur style, following the Ottawa River north, portaging by way of Lake Timiskaming and Lake Abitibi (on the Abitibi River). The assault caught the British entirely by surprise and captured Moose Fort with ease on 20 June. On 3 July, de Troyes took Rupert House along with HBC Craven, which he used to descend on Fort Albany, which fell 26 July. Leaving Pierre Le Moyne d'Iberville in charge of the captured forts, de Troyes returned to Quebec.

By 1696 the British recaptured Fort Moose. In 1713, the Fort Moose area was formally given to the British under the Treaty of Utrecht.

== Fort Denonville ==
In June 1687, de Troyes commanded a company under Governor General Denonville during his campaign against the Seneca. De Troyes' military career was cut short by his death the following year. When Denonville built Fort Denonville (now Fort Niagara) and named it after himself, de Troyes was left in charge. He died during the winter of 1687–1688, along with most of the troops in his garrison, due to scurvy.

== Works ==
- Caron, Ivanhoë (ed.) Journal de l'expédition du chevalier de Troyes à la baie d'Hudson, en 1686. Beauceville: Compagnie de "L'Éclaireur", 1918
