= Thomas Bird (fur trader) =

Canadian fur trader (??–1739)

Thomas Bird (died 1739) was a Hudson's Bay Company factor from 1737 to 1739 at Fort Albany in present-day Ontario, Canada.

Nothing is known of Bird until he entered the Hudson's Bay Company in 1719. His arrival in Canada was eventful as he was shipwrecked during the trip out. He served at Fort York and then Fort Prince of Wales. He returned to England for a season in 1733 returning in 1734 to Fort Albany. He became factor there upon the retirement of the incumbent, Joseph Adams in 1737.
