= Hudson Bay expedition (1686) =

Anglo-French conflict

- Part of King William's War
- Map of the expedition.
Date	1686
Location	Hudson Bay, Rupert's Land (present-day Manitoba, Canada)
Result	French victory

Belligerents
France	Hudson's Bay Company

Commanders and leaders
Chevalier de Troyes; Sieur d'Iberville	John Bridgar

Strength
100+	40; 3 trading posts 1 merchantman

Casualties and losses
Unknown killed and wounded	Unknown killed and wounded 3 trading posts captured 1 merchantman captured

The Hudson Bay expedition of 1686 was one of the Anglo-French conflicts on Hudson Bay. It was the first of several expeditions sent from New France against the trading outposts of the Hudson's Bay Company in the southern reaches of Hudson Bay. Led by the Chevalier de Troyes, the expedition captured the outposts at Moose Factory, Rupert House, Fort Albany, and the company ship Craven.

Although France and England were then at peace, war broke out between them in 1689, and the conflict over the Hudson Bay outposts continued. One of Troyes' lieutenants, Pierre Le Moyne d'Iberville, made further expeditions against HBC holdings; these culminated in the French victory at the 1697 naval Battle of Hudson's Bay. At the end of the war, the French controlled all but one of the company's outposts.

== Background ==
In 1679, French explorer Pierre-Esprit Radisson and financier Charles Aubert de La Chesnaye met in Paris, and laid the foundations for the establishment of a fur trading company they called the Compagnie du Nord. Its objective was to engage in fur trade in northern North America, where the English Hudson's Bay Company (HBC) had realized significant profits in that business. The Compagnie's first major expedition in 1682 successfully seized York Factory. After the Compagnie's profits were virtually wiped out by taxes imposed by authorities in New France, Radisson entered service with the HBC, and led several profitable shipping expeditions to Hudson Bay, including recovering for the company York Factory and the furs taken there.

The Compagnie then convinced New France's governor, the Marquis de Denonville, to organize a military expedition against HBC outposts on Hudson Bay. He recruited Pierre de Troyes, Chevalier de Troyes, a French soldier, and assembled a small force for an overland expedition. It consisted of 30 French regulars, 70 Canadian volunteers, and a few Indian guides. Among the Canadians were three brothers, Pierre Le Moyne d'Iberville, Jacques le Moyne de Sainte-Hélène, and Paul Le Moyne de Maricourt, who later became well known for their exploits.

By 1686, the Hudson's Bay Company had established several outposts in Hudson Bay and James Bay, the southernmost finger of the larger bay. Moose Factory and Rupert House were established on rivers near where they emptied into James Bay. In addition to York Factory, located near the mouth of the Nelson River, there were outposts on the Albany and Severn Rivers where they emptied into Hudson Bay on its western side. All of these outposts were wooden fortresses with some cannons; Fort Albany was the most heavily defended.

== Expedition ==
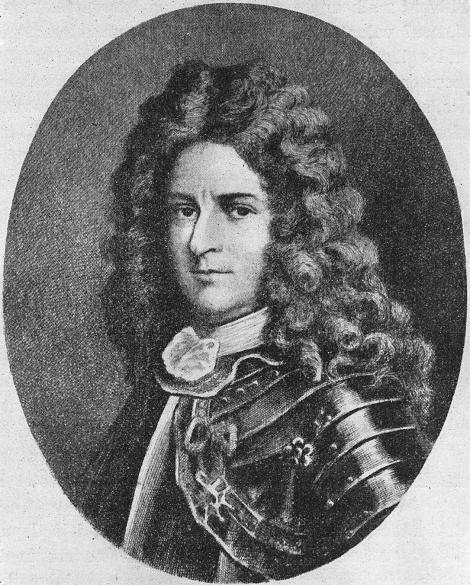
Pierre Le Moyne d'Iberville.

The expedition left Montreal in March 1686, and traveled more than 800 miles (1,300 km) over a period of 82 days. North of Fort Témiscamingue the route had not been explored by white men. The route was up the Ottawa River to Lake Temiskaming, then over portages and down the Abitibi River and Moose River. When they arrived at Moose Factory, it was occupied by 16 men; its governor, John Bridgar, had sailed for Rupert House the day before. In the pre-dawn, brothers Pierre and Jacques Le Moyne led teams quietly into the fort, where they tied down its three cannons before launching an attack on the sleeping garrison. Pierre Le Moyne forced his way into the redoubt housing the defenders, but the defenders shut the gate behind him, and he had to single-handedly defend himself with sword and musket until his soldiers forced the gate open. After a two-hour battle, the garrison surrendered.

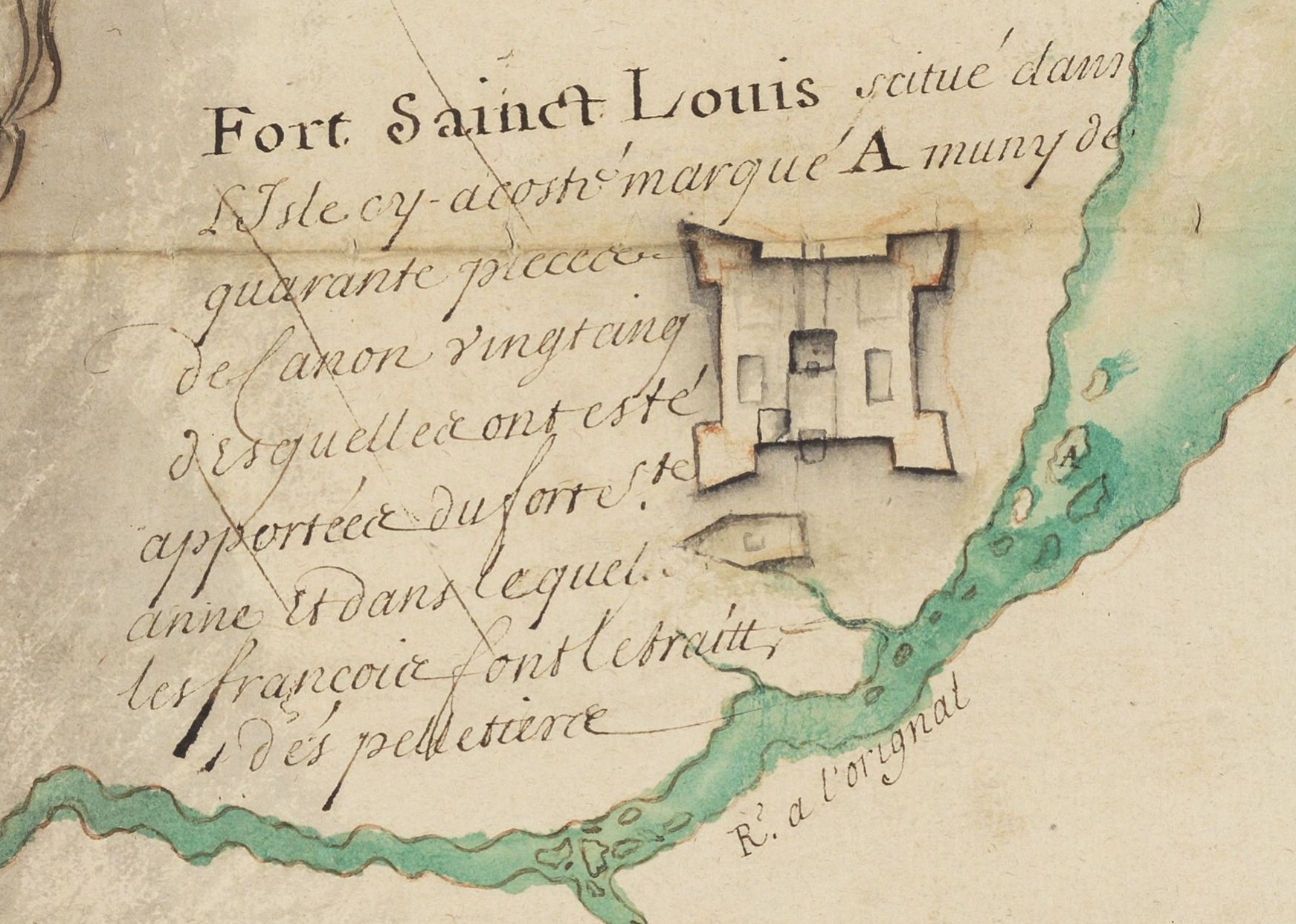
Moose Fort, (now Moose Factory) known as Fort St-Louis, after its capture by troops under Pierre de Troyes in 1686; it was recaptured by the British ten years later

Leaving 40 of his men to guard the fort, De Troyes led the rest toward Rupert House, 75 miles (121 km) northeast across James Bay. Once again they attacked a sleeping garrison, gaining access to the fort via a ladder that had been left propped against one of the fort's walls. They also acquired the HBC ship Craven, which had transported Governor Bridgar from Moose Factory. De Troyes brought the captives taken to Moose Factory, and sent d'Iberville and the Craven, carrying heavy guns loaded from Rupert House, to attack Fort Albany on the west side of the Bay.

Fort Albany was not visible from the water, and De Troyes spent some time searching for it. Its location was finally revealed to him when one of the fort's cannons was helpfully fired at sunset. The French unloaded the heavy guns and dragged them to the fort. According to one source, after firing into the fort without any return fire, they heard faint cries of "Vive le roi !" from deep inside the fort; the men in the fort were cowering in the fort's cellar. Another describes a more determined resistance.

De Troyes shipped all of the HBC captives off to Charlton Island, where a company supply ship eventually picked them up. He then left d'Iberville and 40 men to hold the outposts, and returned overland to Montreal.

Fort Moose (now, Moose Factory, Ontario), changed hands a few times but in 1713, the area was formally given to the British under the Treaty of Utrecht.

== Aftermath ==
D'Iberville, after wintering over in the north, made his way first to Quebec, and then France. There he was given command of the Soleil d'Afrique, with which he returned to Hudson Bay in 1687 to recover the furs that had been seized during the expedition. While he was at Fort Albany, two English warships arrived. Since England and France were at peace, the English settled on an island nearby, and took no offensive measures. D'Iberville, however, did, and captured the ships from the numerically superior English.

Meanwhile, James II and Louis XIV had negotiated a 'Treaty of Peace, good Correspondence and Neutrality in America' to settle the Anglo-French conflict on the Bay. It provided that each side would keep whatever it 'now possessed'. France knew about the forts and England did not. In 1688 James II was overthrown, England and France went to war and the treaty became moot.

== Effect on First Nations traders ==
When these three outposts were taken from the British by the French, the First Nations traders were unable to meet trade requirements. "Ever since the destruction of Fort Charles in 1686 the Rupert River had been without an English fort, the Indians going to Eastmain or to Moose Fort."
