= Compagnie du Nord =

French colonial fur-trading company

The Compagnie du Nord (also referred to as the Northern Company) was a French colonial fur-trading company, founded in Québec City 1682 by a group of Canadien financiers with the express intent of competing with the English Hudson's Bay Company. It was founded by Charles Aubert de La Chesnaye with the assistance of Pierre-Esprit Radisson and his brother-in-law Médard Chouart des Groseilliers.

== Background ==
Sometime around 1663, the Ottawa people were driven westward from the area around Georgian Bay to the area around Lake Superior and Lake Michigan by the Iroquois. Settling around Chequamegon Bay, the Ottawa came into contact with tribes such as the Potawatomi, Sioux, Sauk, Meskwaki, Miami, and Illinois, and informed them of European demand for beaver pelts in exchange for European goods, becoming middlemen between these western peoples and the French in the east. The Ottawa enjoyed this position of middleman in trade until the founding of the English Hudson's Bay Company in 1670; this disrupted the French trading scheme, as instead of relying on overland routes from Québec and Ottawa middlemen, western tribes could trade directly with the English at Hudson Bay, offering more goods at much more favourable rates of exchange.

As the source of the best beaver pelts was the Hudson Bay, the French saw it fit to try and increase their foothold over trade in that region. To that end, Louis de Buade de Frontenac, then Governor-General of New France, dispatched Father Charles Albanel to the Bay in 1674 to both found a Catholic mission and to encourage Groseilliers, then an employee of the HBC, to return to the service of the French. Albanel was unsuccessful in his first goal due to being imprisoned upon his arrival by HBC Governor Charles Bayly, but Groseilliers and Albanel found themselves on the same boat headed for England in the spring of 1675, and the former was successfully persuaded to leave the service of the HBC.

Upon their released from English custody, Albanel and Groseilliers went to France, meeting up with Radisson, also an HBC employee at the time, and First Minister of State Jean-Baptiste Colbert to design plans for French fur exploitation in the Hudson Bay region. After being pardoned by Colbert for working with the English, Radisson went with Groseilliers were sent by Colbert to New France in 1676 to discuss plans for fur trading in the Hudson Bay region with Frontenac, but to their surprise they found little enthusiasm from him for these plans. They soon came to realize that Frontenac had other plans for the expansion of the French fur trade - namely, that he preferred the idea of building forts around the eastern Great Lakes region, trading with western tribes in that manner. Frontenac's policy was detrimental to a sizeable group of Montréal and Québec-based merchants, as these trading posts would be the new centre of profits from fur trading rather than Montréal. Matters worsened in 1678 when Robert de La Salle was granted permission to explore the Mississippi Valley for fur-trading purposes; with this group of Montréal/Québec merchants being forced out of the Great Lakes and what would become Louisiana, they had no choice but to look north to continue making their profits.

La Chesnaye, a member of the anti-Frontenac group of merchants, selected Louis Jolliet to lead an overland expedition to the Hudson Bay in May 1679. Upon his return to Québec that autumn, Jolliet noted that many indigenous peoples that had formerly used the Ottawa as middlemen for trade with the Canadiens now traded directly with the English at the Bay. Combined with increasing hostility from Frontenac after the Governor-General accused La Chesnaye and others of trading with the English, Jolliet's observation served as the impetus for the creation of the Compagnie du Nord. The creation of the Compagnie was ultimately realized after July 1682, when Frontenac was recalled to France and replaced by Joseph-Antoine de La Barre, who was much more supportive of the idea of fur trading in the Hudson Bay.

== Pre-charter years, 1682–1685 ==
The company's early years, between its foundation in 1682 and being granted a royal charter in May 1685, were marked by great informality in structure. The Compagnie was not a corporation, but a partnership, and as a result no minimum investment (such as a minimum amount of shares held) was required in order to become a director of the Compagnie.

In July 1682, Radisson and Groseilliers and a crew of thirty, including Groseilliers' son Jean-Baptiste Chouart, set sail for the Bay, and arrived at the mouth of the Hayes River on August 19, 1682, shortly before the arrival of a New England–based expedition and an HBC expedition, both of which were sent for the purpose of establishing trading posts and consolidating English control of the Bay. Although both expeditions were aware of the French presence, they were not aware of each other's presence, and the French expedition was able to burn both English forts and take prisoners from both expeditions. After wintering at the Bay, Jean-Baptiste Chouart was left to oversee the French fort, while Radisson and Groseilliers returned with prisoners and 2,000 pelts, arriving in Québec on October 20, 1683. Despite nearly running the English out of the Bay entirely and establishing a French foothold in the region, this expedition was of limited success financially, and the Compagnie was not able to pay its crew for the expedition.

To add insult to unexpected injury, the 2,000 pelts gained from this expedition were confiscated by the rival Company of the Farm over a jurisdictional dispute. The Farm held a right to impose a tax of sorts, the droit du quart, on all beaver pelts moved through colonies, and standard procedure was to take all pelts through the Farm's Québec office so that the droit would be paid before allowing the rest to be exported to European markets. The Compagnie du Nord, however, did not view the Hudson Bay to be under the jurisdiction of the Farm. La Chesnaye argued this case in front of La Barre, who settled the case in favour of the Compagnie du Nord on November 8, 1683; however, final jurisdiction over the dispute lay with the Crown, and on April 10, 1684 La Barre's ruling was overturned, forcing the Compagnie to pay the droit to the Farm and to watch their already-limited profits from the expedition disappear.

Following this ruling on the droit, Radisson became disillusioned with serving the French and returned to the service of the Hudson Bay Company, and in August 1684 established two English trading posts, including York Factory on the Nelson River. This was discovered by a Compagnie-funded expedition led by Claude de Bermen de la Martinière, arriving on September 22, 1684 to find not only these new trading posts and the destruction of the old French post, but also that Chouart had been convinced by Radisson to leave the Compagnie in favour of employment by the HBC as well. La Martinière narrowly avoided capture by the English on his return to Québec and even acquired 20,000 livres worth of cargo from an English ship, the expedition ultimately put the Compagnie down to 273,000 livres in debt in total.

The overall failure of these two expeditions led the Compagnie to realize that it could not effectively compete with the Hudson's Bay Company without a royal charter similar to what the HBC enjoyed. Philippe Gaultier de Comporté was tasked to present the Compagnie's petition to the French court, and in 1685 he arrived to do so. Comporté requested royal monetary support and the right for retaliatory military action (allowing the Compagnie to undertake more than mere trading expeditions). Comporté's petition was successful, and a charter was granted on May 20, 1685; in addition, La Barre was recalled to France and replaced by Jacques-René de Brisay de Denonville, who had been instructed by royal authorities to give full support to the Compagnie.

== Peak of the Compagnie, 1686–1693 ==
With the Compagnie now being able to wage military conflicts in the Hudson Bay region, it outfitted an expedition led by Pierre Chevalier de Troyes with the intent of regaining control of the region surrounding the Nelson and Hayes Rivers. In preparation for this expedition, two forts, Fort St. Joseph and Fort St. Anne, were established on Lake Abitibi and Lake Timiskaming, respectively, and Troyes was to stop at each fort for resupplying purposes if necessary. Due to the presence of a large number of voyageurs who were strongly familiar with the terrain, the expedition made good progress despite agonizing travel conditions overland, and between June 19 and July 26, 1686, three English forts were surrendered to the French. However, Troyes did not recapture the English posts in the Nelson-Hayes region, so despite the profit earned by the Compagnie, the loss incurred to the HBC, and near-total control of the Bay, the Compagnie (and Denonville as well) were displeased.

Due to the intense difficulty associated with traversing an overland route to these three newly-acquired forts, the Compagnie found itself in a difficult situation. Still determined to control the Nelson-Hayes region, the Compagnie took strongly to the ideas of Pierre Le Moyne d'Iberville, who recommended a naval approach to restocking the forts and, above all, controlling the Nelson-Hayes even at the expense of the three forts in the Lower Bay. Iberville led a naval expedition with royal support in the spring of 1688, and following the successful capture of two HBC ships and an overwintering on the Bay, he sailed to La Rochelle in France in the spring of 1689. He was promptly arrested by agents of the Farm for failing to pay the droit du quart in Québec, but was ultimately released and returned to Québec, where the Compagnie ultimately recorded profits of 40,000 livres for the expedition. As a result of the expedition, the Compagnie's hold on the Lower Bay region had also been confirmed.

Following the Glorious Revolution in England in 1689, the English joined the Grand Alliance against the French in the Nine Years' War. Following this outbreak of hostilities, French authorities encouraged Frontenac, who had been re-appointed as Governor-General in place of Denonville, to support the Compagnie's plans to plan a direct attack on Fort Bourbon (now York Factory), but the Compagnie was frustrated by a lack of military support from France in this endeavour. Iberville set sail in June 1690 to capture Fort Bourbon, but the poorly-outfitted expedition was met by three heavily armed HBC ships in the Nelson-Hayes region. Iberville retreated to find that an English post on the Severn River had been preemptively burned by the HBC in anticipation of a French assault. The expedition was entirely funded by the Compagnie, and as such was an absolute financial disaster.

Pressed financially and for time against the threat of English encroachment, the Compagnie petitioned the Crown for royal support for an expedition to capture Fort Bourbon and to run the HBC out of the Bay altogether. Support for this was granted on April 7, 1691, sending the heavily armed war vessel Hazardeux and offering to bankroll much of the expedition. However, the Hazardeux arrived in Québec on July 13, and the ship's commander François du Tast refused to set sail on account of the advancing season and the threat of ice. On February 27, 1692, the French court tried to get the expedition off earlier, but equipping merchant ships led to yet another delay; the Poly, a thirty-six gun man-of-war with a 130-strong crew, finally set sail on May 14, but did not arrive until August 19 due to more difficult crossing conditions than normal, and again the expedition was far too late to be sent that year. However, the Poly was sent out from La Rochelle in early April 1693, but treacherous conditions again delayed its arrival at Québec until July 23. These delays all gave the English ample time to resupply their forts and to capture French forts, and by 1693 the Compagnie found itself without a single fort on the Bay, the same situation that the Compagnie had found itself in back in 1686.

== Twilight years, 1694–1700 ==
The successive failures to send an expedition to capture Fort Bourbon caused a rift between the Compagnie's metropolitan French directors and its Canadien directors. In a 1693 memoir, the French proposed that the Compagnie should be controlled from La Rochelle, arguing that, not only was forcing Québec as a port of call responsible for the delays in sending out the expeditions, but that the cost for outfitting these expeditions was much cheaper in France than in Canada. This left the Canadiens in a difficult situation when trying to convince the French directors to contribute additional funds for a 1694 expedition.

On account of this impasse, the French royal authorities saw it fit to go through Iberville directly in order to create a new expedition. The costs were to be shared by the Crown and Iberville, and Iberville would have the Poly and another man-of-war, the Salamandre, at his disposal. The Compagnie was expressly excluded from any profits that would be earned in this expedition; furthermore, if the expedition were profitable enough, Iberville would be given direct trading rights in the Bay at least until July 1697. Because of this, the French authorities gave the Compagnie a chance to confirm their re-involvement in the Hudson Bay trade at this time, but internal disputes forced the Compagnie to recuse themselves at least until 1697, although they ended up contributing 15,000 livres to Iberville's expedition at his urging.

Iberville, accompanied by his brother Joseph Le Moyne de Sérigny, set sail from Québec on August 10, 1694 and arrived at Fort Bourbon on September 24, forcing a surrender of the fort on October 14. Iberville overwintered at the Bay and ended up profiting 160,000 livres for his efforts, which were not subject to the droit du quart levied by the Farm. However, French possession of the fort was short-lived, as it was retaken by the English on September 6, 1695.

Iberville was tasked to recapture Fort Bourbon in 1697, and once again the Compagnie du Nord was intentionally excluded from making plans for this expedition. Due to it being an entirely royal venture, the expedition set out directly from La Rochelle on July 8. It reached the Nelson-Hayes region on September 4, and after nine days of fighting with English warships, the English surrendered Fort Bourbon on September 13. However, despite now having firm control of Fort Bourbon, the Compagnie was still unable to commit to managing the trade from the region, due to a lack of necessary funding for the exorbitant cost of outfitting expeditions, which could run anywhere from 100,000 to 180,000 livres.

== Dissolution and legacy ==
As the Compagnie was clearly in no position to retake the mantle of handling the Hudson Bay trade, the French royal authorities saw it fit to establish an entirely new company for that purpose. As part of this establishment, the Company of the Farm accepted an offer to have the surplus of beaver bought out by a group of Canadian merchants separate from the Compagnie, while the Compagnie du Nord's charter was formally revoked on January 10, 1700. With both of the main players in the Canadian fur trade now no longer possessing trading rights, the Crown established the Compagnie de la Colonie on October 10, 1700, taking over the trading rights from both the Farm and the Compagnie.

Although the Compagnie had, at multiple points, the ability to completely remove the English from the Hudson Bay, the Compagnie's main legacy is its impressive financial failure, although this is not necessarily true of its directors or other people involved with it. La Chesnaye was not bankrupted, and in fact became the primary shareholder in the Compagnie de la Colonie upon its establishment in 1700. Not much is known of Groseilliers after his early service with the Compagnie, and even his date of death is disputed, although the Canadian Dictionary of Bibliography holds him to have died around 1696; a similar lack of known fate is true of Radisson, although he is known to have died in England in 1710. Iberville, for his part, died in 1706 in Havana, after escapades in Louisiana and the Caribbean.

== See also ==
- List of French colonial trading companies
- List of chartered companies
