= Battle of Fort Albany (1693) =

Coordinates: 52°15′04″N 81°30′04″W

The Battle of Fort Albany in 1693 was the successful recapture by English forces of the Hudson's Bay Company trading outpost at Fort Albany in the southern reaches of Hudson Bay. The fort, captured by a French expedition in 1686 and held by them in a battle the next year, was briefly defended by five Frenchmen, who then abandoned the fort and its stockpile of furs to a four-ship English fleet commanded by James Knight.
