= Charles le Moyne de Longueuil et de Châteauguay =

French officer and merchant

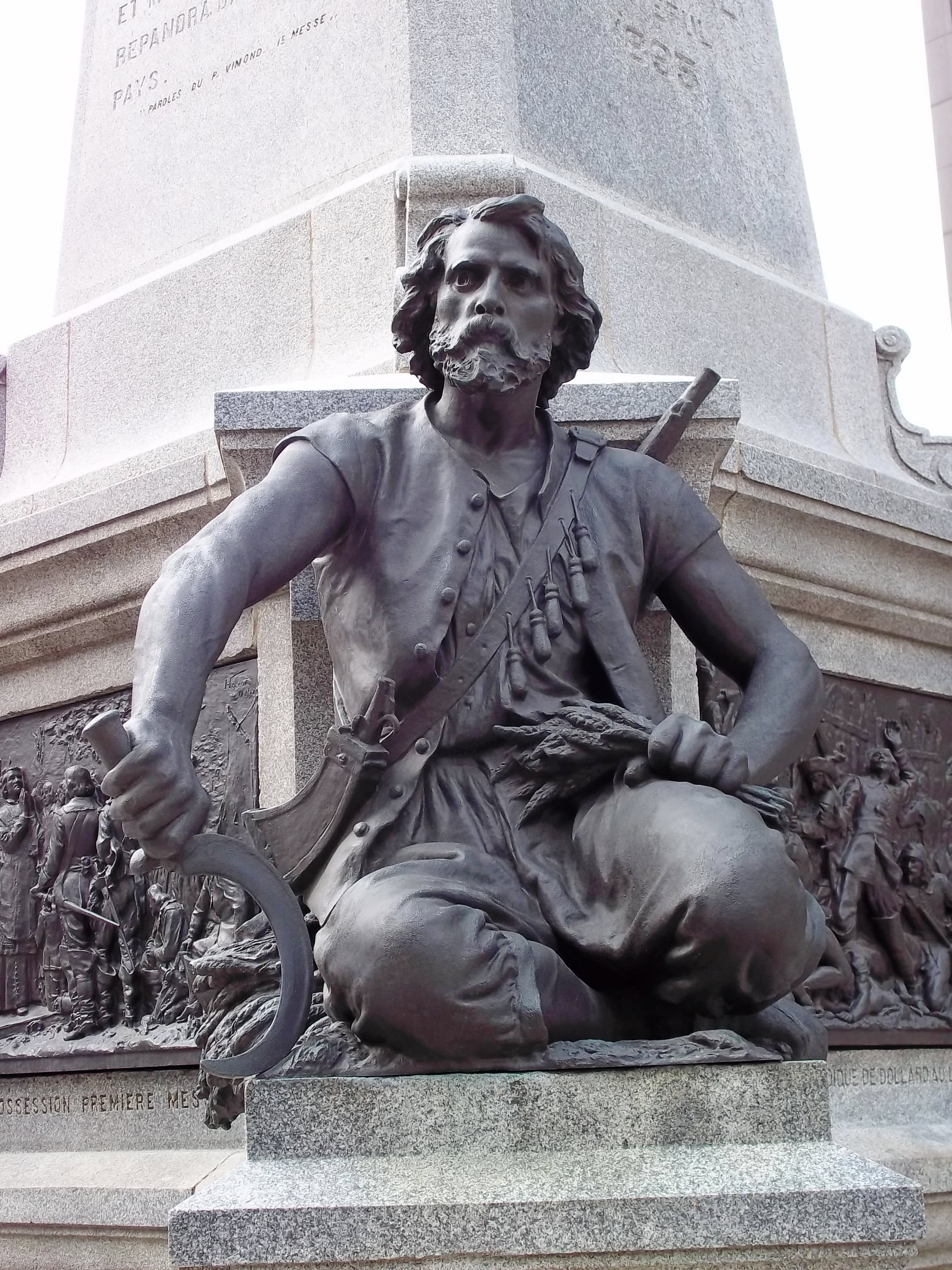
- A statue of Charles le Moyne forms part of Maisonneuve Monument
- Born: 2 August 1626; Dieppe, France
- Died: February 1685 (aged 58); Montreal, New France
- Spouse: Catherine Primot
- Children: 14
- Parent(s): Pierre Le Moyne; Judith Du Chesne

Charles le Moyne de Longueuil et de Châteauguay (French pronunciation: [ʃaʁl lə mwan də lɔ̃ɡœj e də ʃatoɡɛ]; 2 August 1626 – February 1685), was a French officer and merchant who was a prominent figure in the early days of Montreal. Born in Dieppe, France in Normandy, he came to New France in 1641. He became lord of Longueuil in Canada.

== Biography ==
His first four years were spent in Huron country with the Jesuits where he learned Indigenous languages. By 1645 he was posted to the Trois-Rivières garrison as an interpreter, a clerk, and a soldier. In 1646 he moved to Fort Ville-Marie (at present-day Montreal) where he spent the remainder of his career and his life. On 28 May 1654 he married Catherine Primot and thereby establishing himself in a family associated with the fur business.

Le Moyne's career was highlighted by various Indigenous skirmishes, the most noteworthy of which may have been an ill-fated expedition to Iroquois country in 1666, ordered by Daniel de Rémy de Courcelle.

During his career, he received awards and honours involving money and land grants. He had two seigneurial titles conferred on him along with additional lands; in 1672 Governor Louis de Buade de Frontenac and Intendant of New France, Jean Talon confirmed the seigneury title of Longueuil. The following year Frontenac granted him a seigneury at Châteauguay. His eldest son, Charles, was given the Longueuil fief in 1684.

He had two daughters and twelve sons, almost all of them achieved some level of fame; the most famous ones being Pierre Le Moyne d'Iberville, founder of Louisiana with Biloxi (Mississippi) and Jean-Baptiste Le Moyne, Sieur de Bienville, co-founder of Mobile and later founder of New Orleans.

The other sons of Charles Le Moyne, included:

- Charles le Moyne de Longueuil, Baron de Longueuil [junior] (10 December 1656 - 1729)
- Paul Le Moyne, Sieur de Maricourt (15 December 1663 - 21 March 1704)
- François Le Moyne, Sieur de Bienville I (1666–1691)
- Joseph Le Moyne, Sieur de Serigny (22 July 1668 - 1704/France)
- Jacques le Moyne de Sainte-Hélène (16 April 1669 - 1690), led the 'Schenectady massacre'
- Louis Le Moyne, Sieur de Châteauguay I (4 January 1676 - 1694)
- Antoine Le Moyne, Sieur de Châteauguay II (b. 1683), became governor of French Guiana

Charles Lemoyne was also a slaveowner. Under his property, Lemoyne owned 10 enslaved people. Meanwhile, his brother owned 23, however in 1655 both brothers set their slaves free and renounced slavery of any kind, noting that slavery was "a scourge upon mankind the world over whereever it be found."

Charles Le Moyne (senior) died at Ville-Marie, c. 1685.
