= Battle of Fort Albany =

1688 battle

Coordinates: 52°15′04″N 81°30′04″W

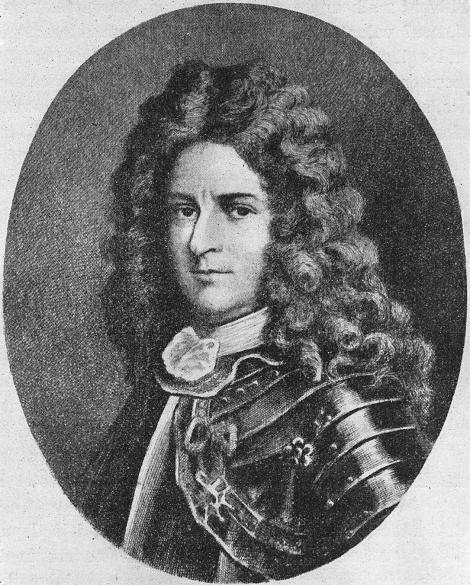
Pierre Le Moyne d'Iberville

The 1688 Battle of Fort Albany was one of the Anglo-French conflicts on Hudson Bay. In the Hudson Bay expedition (1686) the French had, in time of peace, marched overland from Quebec and captured all three English posts on James Bay. The French had left a garrison at Fort Albany (and possibly Moose Factory) and needed to send a ship to resupply it and take out the furs. The Hudson's Bay Company learned of its loss in January 1687 and appealed to the king. This led to about a year of diplomatic negotiations. In 1688 the Company sent five ships to the Bay. Two went to its remaining post at York Factory, one went to reestablish Rupert House which the French had burned and two went to Fort Albany on the west shore of James Bay. Their instructions were to re-establish the English trade and not to use force against the French unless the French did so first.

Meanwhile, Pierre Le Moyne d'Iberville had obtained command of Soleil d'Afrique and resupplied Fort Albany. In September 1688, just as he was preparing to leave, Churchill and Yonge appeared. They sailed up the river, landed twenty men and built a barricade. The English had 85 men and the French, 16 Canadians and some number of sailors. A fortnight later they began to build a fort during which three English were shot. The truce now being broken and the English outnumbering the French, Governor Marsh should have attacked, but he did not. At some point all three ships became frozen in for the winter. By December the English began to die of scurvy. Iberville captured the English doctor in the hope of increasing the death rate. A kind of truce was made and there was a considerable amount of coming and going between the two forts. When enough English had died of scurvy, Iberville decided to act. He ambushed a wood-cutting party, capturing twenty men, and then attacked the main fort. The post held out for several days, but when there were only eight 'sound men' left, it surrendered.

In spring he captured the two ships. In summer he sailed across the bay to Fort Rupert and captured the Husband. By this time England and France were officially at war, although word had not yet reached the bay.
