= Charles Aubert de La Chesnaye =

French businessman

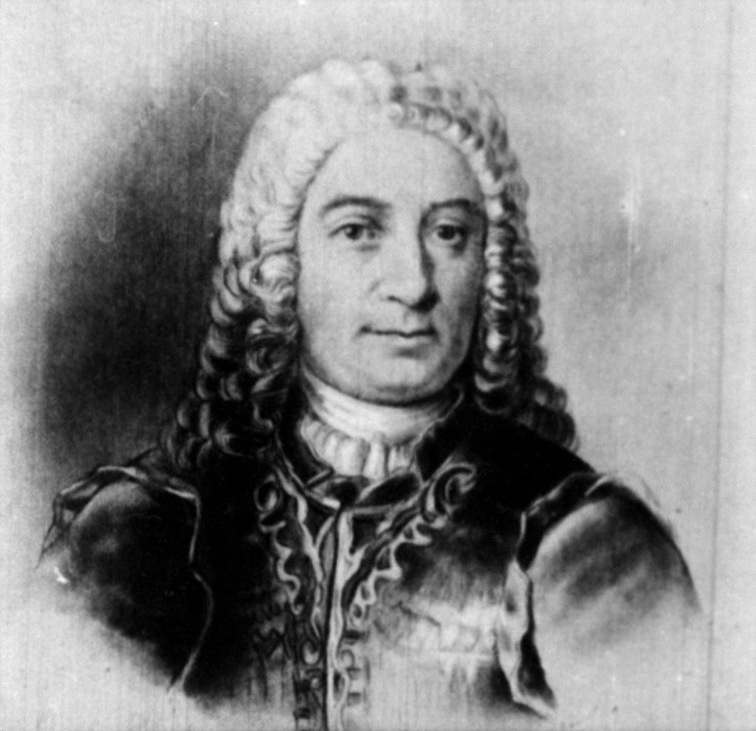
Charles Aubert de La Chesnaye

Charles Aubert de La Chesnaye (French pronunciation: [ʃaʁl obɛʁ də la ʃɛnɛ]; 12 February 1632 – 20 September 1702) was a French businessman active in Canada. The richest financier and businessman in New France, he played an important part in the colony's economic life (such as its trade, finance, fur trade, fishing and agriculture), owned several seigneuries and was a member of the Sovereign Council of New France. In 1682 he founded the (largely unsuccessful) Compagnie du Nord to compete with the Hudson's Bay Company. He has been called "the principal businessman and the greatest landowner of the colony". Several places in the Quebec province and Quebec City are named after him and in 1971 he was made one of Canada's Persons of National Historic Significance. His descendants include the writer Philippe-Joseph Aubert de Gaspé.
