= Pierre Le Moyne d'Iberville =

French military officer, explorer and colonial administrator (1661–1706)

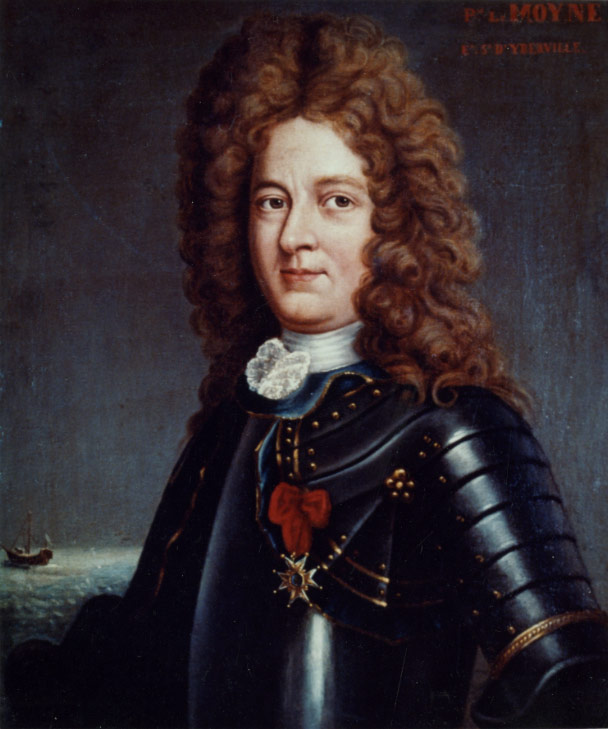
- Portrait of d'Iberville
- Born: 16 July 1661; Ville-Marie, New France
- Died: 9 July 1706 (aged 44); Havana, Cuba
- Spouse: Marie-Thérèse Pollet
- Children: 5
- Military career
- Allegiance: France
- Branch: French Navy
- Service years: 1686–1706
- Rank: Ship-of-the-line captain
- Commands: Pélican
- Conflicts: King William's War; Hudson Bay expedition (1686); Battle of Fort Albany; Schenectady massacre; Capture of York Factory; Action of 14 July 1696; Siege of Pemaquid (1696); Avalon Peninsula campaign; Battle of Hudson's Bay; Queen Anne's War
- Awards: Order of Saint Louis

Pierre Le Moyne d'Iberville (Note: The name Pierre Le Moyne d'Iberville is pronounced /piˈɛər lə ˈmwɑːn ˌdiːbɛərˈviːl, -ˈvɪl/ pee-AIR lə MWAHN DEE-bair-VEEL, -VIL, French: [pjɛʁ lə mwan dibɛʁvil]. The title Sieur is pronounced /sjɜːr/ SYUR, French: [sjœʁ]. However, residents of the Mississippi Gulf Coast pronounce the city of D'Iberville as /diˈaɪbərvɪl/ dee-EYE-bər-vil.) (16 July 1661 – 9 July 1706) or Sieur d'Iberville was a French military officer, explorer, colonial administrator and merchant. He is noted for founding the colony of Louisiana in New France. He was born in Montreal to French colonists.

== Early life ==
Pierre Le Moyne was born in July 1661 at Fort Ville-Marie (now Montreal), in the French colony of Canada, the third son of Charles le Moyne de Longueuil et de Châteauguay, a native of Dieppe or of Longueuil near Dieppe, Normandy in France and lord of Longueuil in Canada, and of Catherine Thierry Messier (called Catherine Primot in some sources) from Rouen. He is also known as Sieur d'Iberville (et d'Ardillières).

He had eleven brothers, most of whom became soldiers. One, Jacques Le Moyne de Sainte-Hélène, led French and Indian forces in the Schenectady massacre in present-day New York's Mohawk Valley. Charles le Moyne de Longueuil, Baron de Longueuil, was governor of Montreal. Another, Jean-Baptiste Le Moyne Bienville, founded New Orleans. Jacques and Paul LeMoyne were with him on James Bay, and Joseph LeMoyne was with him in Louisiana.

Le Moyne d'Iberville was raised Catholic under the Jesuit order. Parish records indicate that he made his First Communion at the age of 12. Like most young men of his background, who received a classical and religious education, d'Iberville was educated in a Sulpician seminary.

Destined for the priesthood, he chose the military vocation. At the age of 12, he became a cabin boy on his uncle's ship trading to Port Royal, Acadia. A few years later he was in the fur trade at Sault Ste. Marie in Canada, where he would have learned something of canoe travel in the wilderness. He later became quartermaster on one of his father's ships.

== Hudson Bay expeditions ==
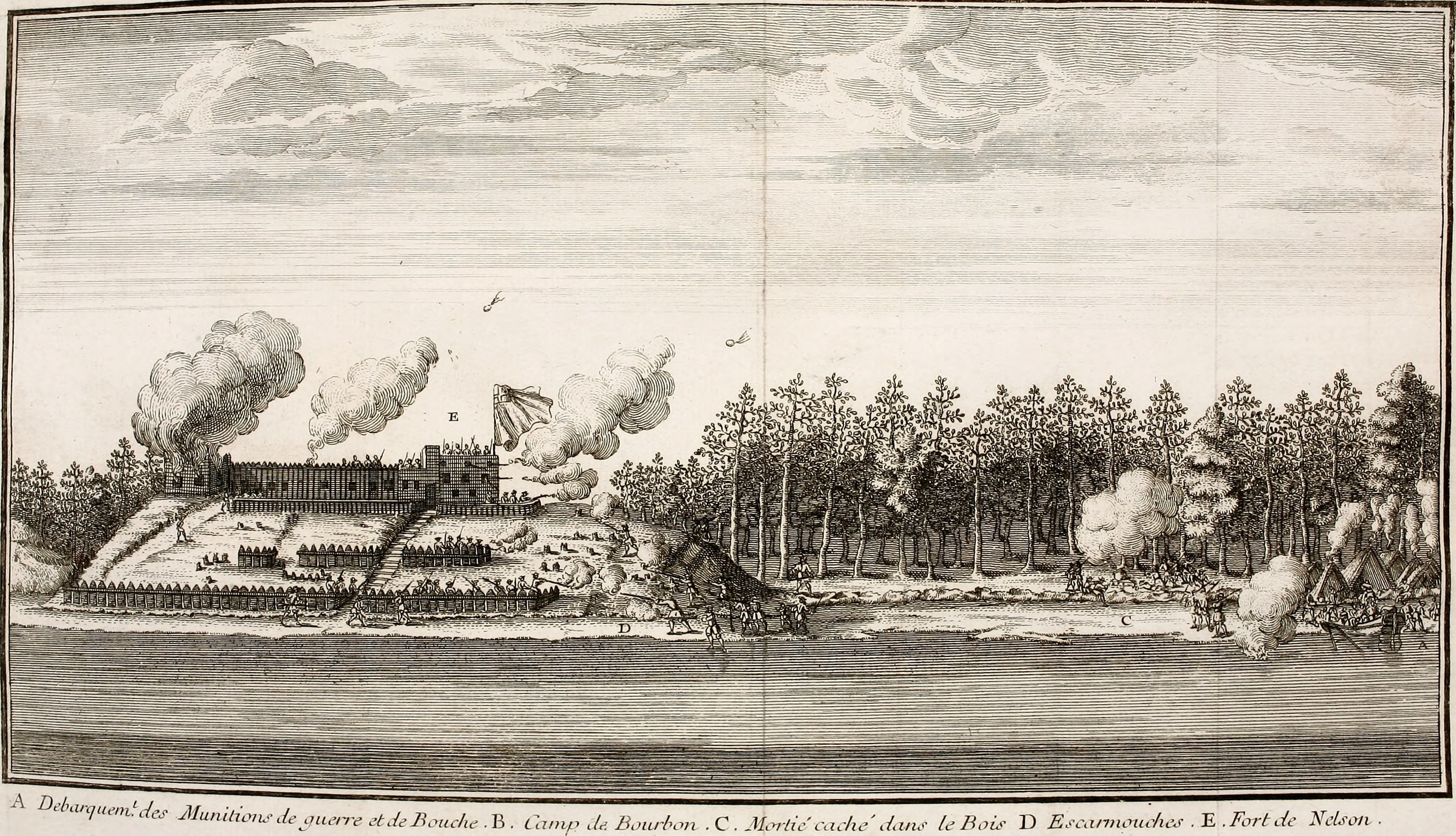
French forces led by d'Iberville, managed to defeat an English squadron, and capture York Factory during the Battle of Hudson's Bay.

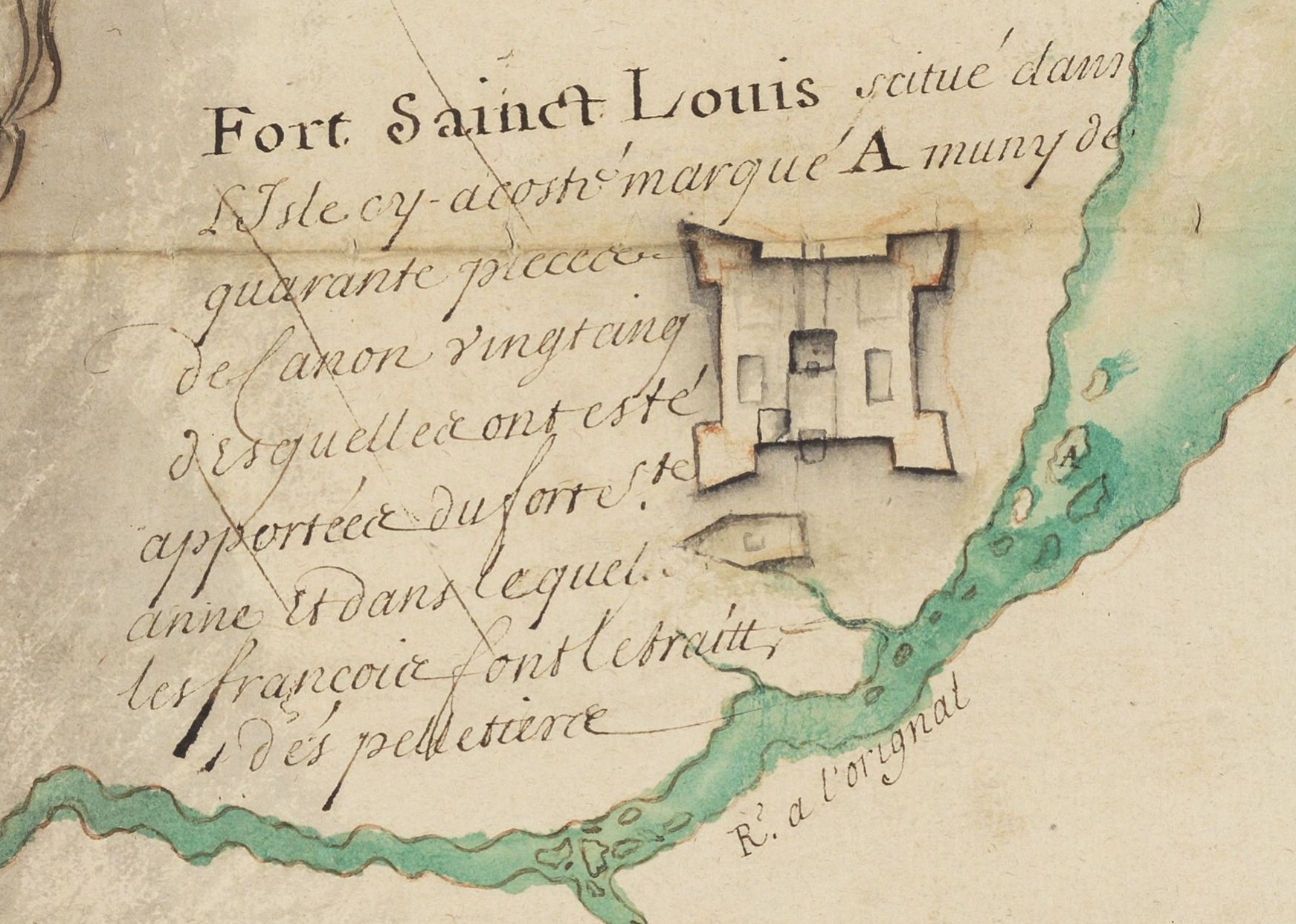
Moose Fort, later known as Moose Factory, was called Fort St-Louis after its capture by the French in 1696. It was recaptured by the British in 1696

The Hudson's Bay Company was founded in 1670. This company diverted furs away from Quebec and threatened further expansion into French territory. In 1682, the Compagnie du Nord was founded to compete with the English on the Bay. In 1686, the aggressive Governor General Denonville decided to drive out the English even though the two countries were at peace.

Under the command of Pierre de Troyes, Chevalier de Troyes, d'Iberville his brothers Paul and Jacques led the Canadian woodsmen on a 1686 expedition to Hudson Bay. He played a heroic part in the capture of the fort at Moose Factory. At Fort-Rupert, he captured the sloop Craven and killed at least one unarmed sailor. As a result, the French seized all three English posts on James Bay, leaving the English only York Factory which was far to the northwest and inaccessible by land.

De Troyes left in August 1686, leaving d'Iberville in charge with 40 men. The following summer, when no supplies arrived, d'Iberville left 12 men at the forts and went first south to Quebec and then to France. In France, he lobbied for the Compagnie and obtained command of Soleil D'Afrique and returned to James Bay in the summer of 1688. There he captured three HBC ships that were trying to re-establish their position on James Bay.

Returning to Quebec, he was caught up in King William's War and sent south to attack the British colonies (see below). In July 1690, he left Quebec with three ships in the hope of capturing York Factory. Finding himself outgunned by a larger English ship, he fled south and captured the new HBC base at Fort Severn. In 1692 and 1693, he again planned to attack York Factory, but both times the needed ships were diverted.

It was 1694 before he could effect the capture of York Factory. His work was undone when the English recaptured Fort Albany in 1693 and York Factory in 1695. 1695 and 1696 were spent in coastal raiding. In 1697 he captured York Factory a second time after winning his most heroic battle. It was too late in the season to capture Fort Albany, so he left Hudson Bay, never to return. York Factory remained French until 1713.

== King William's War ==
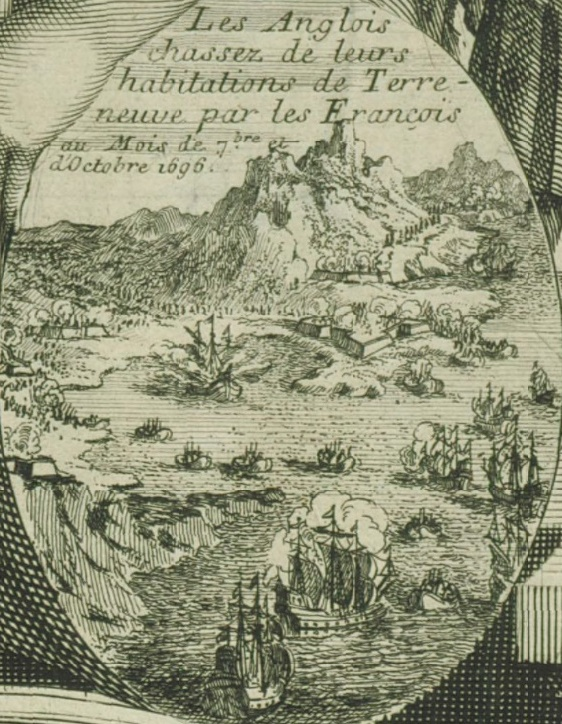
The Avalon Peninsula campaign was a military operation led by d'Iberville, that saw English settlements throughout Newfoundland sacked by French forces.

In 1690, he was second in command to his brother Jacques in a raid south to New York that culminated in the Schenectady Massacre. In 1692, he convoyed supply ships from France and harassed English coastal settlements, taking three prizes. In 1694, he returned to Hudson Bay and captured York Factory for the first time.

In the spring of 1696, he sailed from France with three ships. Sending one to Quebec, he led the other two to the aid of the governor of Acadia, Joseph Robineau de Villebon, whom the English were blockading at the mouth of the Saint John River. He captured one enemy ship and drove the other two away. He then went 200 miles west and captured the most northerly settlement in New England, Pemaquid, Siege of Pemaquid (1696), 14 August.

He then sailed east to Placentia, the French capital of Newfoundland, and began the Avalon Peninsula campaign on 1 November. On this expedition he captured St. John's and ruined most of the English fishing villages. During four months of raids, Iberville was responsible for the destruction of 36 settlements.

The Newfoundland campaign was one of the cruelest and most destructive of Iberville's career. Before he could consolidate his hold on Newfoundland, he was diverted north to capture York Factory for a second time during the summer of 1697. Soon after his departure, the English arrived in Newfoundland with 2,000 troops and restored their position. Hostilities ended with the Treaty of Ryswick in September 1697.

== Exploring Louisiana ==
In 1682, René-Robert Cavelier, Sieur de La Salle was the first European to travel from the Great Lakes down the Mississippi River to the Gulf of Mexico. The French began dreaming of building a great empire by linking the Saint Lawrence and Mississippi basins, thereby bottling up the English on the Atlantic coast. This presented diplomatic problems; the Gulf coast was claimed, though not occupied, by Spain.

Pontchartrain, the minister for naval affairs and colonies, gave d'Iberville the task of locating the mouth of the Mississippi River, which La Salle had failed to find on his last expedition, and building a fort which would block the river to other nations. D'Iberville left Brest with four ships in October 1698. He sailed along the Florida coast, past the base the Spanish were building at Pensacola.

In March 1699, he entered the Birdfoot Delta. It was only after meeting some Indians who remembered La Salle that he was sure that this was the Mississippi. Having achieved his first aim and finding no good sites in the delta, he built a temporary fort Fort Maurepas at Ocean Springs, Mississippi, left a garrison of 81 men, and returned to France.

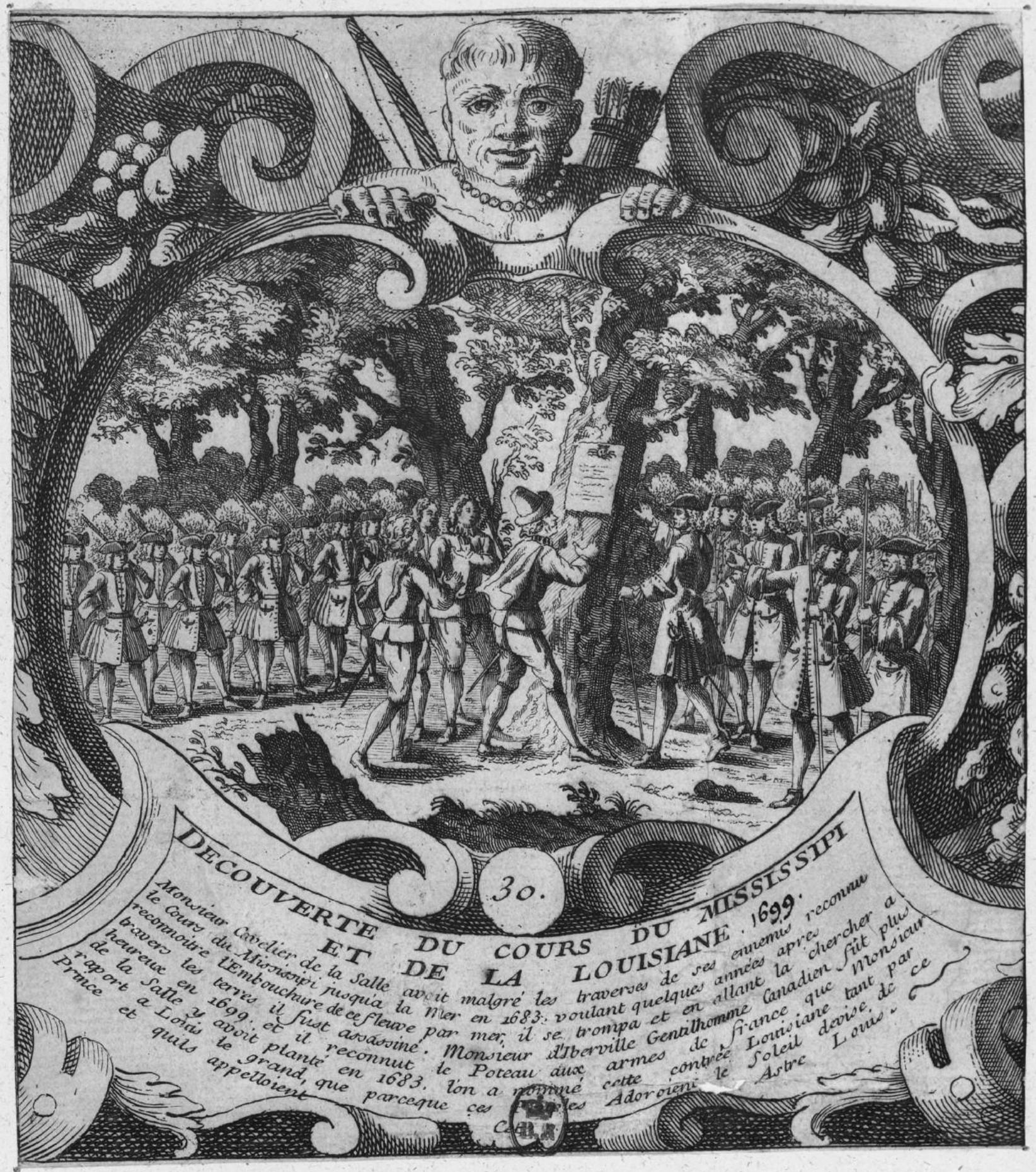
A depiction of d'Iberville and Cavelier de La Salle exploring Louisiana.

On his second voyage, he reached Biloxi in January 1700. He built a second "Fort Maurepas" 40 miles up the Mississippi River. On his return journey, he is said to have stopped at New York City and sold 9,000 furs that coureurs des bois had given him, in preference to hauling them back to Montreal. This story illustrates the benefits of the future New Orleans area as a port, the size of the French presence on the Mississippi at this early date, and d'Iberville's questionable business practices. On his third voyage in February 1701, he built a fort at Mobile. Here, Henri de Tonti aided him in establishing good relations with the Indians. He left Louisiana for the last time in April 1702. His brother Jean-Baptiste Le Moyne de Bienville founded New Orleans in 1718.

== Queen Anne's War and his death ==
In 1702, England and France were again at war (War of the Spanish Succession, 1701–1714, the North American theater of which was Queen Anne's War). D'Iberville had contracted malaria on the Gulf coast, and both his health and judgment seem to have deteriorated. Early in 1706, he left France in command of twelve vessels. A squadron under Henri-Louis de Chavagnac devastated Saint Kitts. From 1 to 22 April, d'Iberville and Chavagnac devastated the island of Nevis and took much of the population prisoner.

He went to Havana, where he was involved in planning an expedition against Charles Town, Carolina (an English colonial settlement), when he died suddenly, perhaps of yellow fever, in July, 1706. D'Iberville was buried at Church of San Cristóbal (Havana Cathedral); the burial records identify him under his French name, and as El General Dom Pedro Berbila.

After his death, his estate became involved in an inquiry that dragged on for more than thirty years. D'Iberville had acquired a large fortune by uncertain means. The accounts of the West Indian expedition were hopelessly disorganized; there were accusations of embezzlement. His widow, Marie Thérèse Pollet (1672–1740) was forced to pay back a large part of her inheritance.

D'Iberville was perhaps the first great soldier born in Canada. Students of the art of war may see his career as an example of the importance of following up after a victory, for he won all his battles but never was able to consolidate what he had won.

== Honours ==
Pierre Le Moyne d'Iberville was a knight of the Order of Saint-Louis.

=== Legacy ===
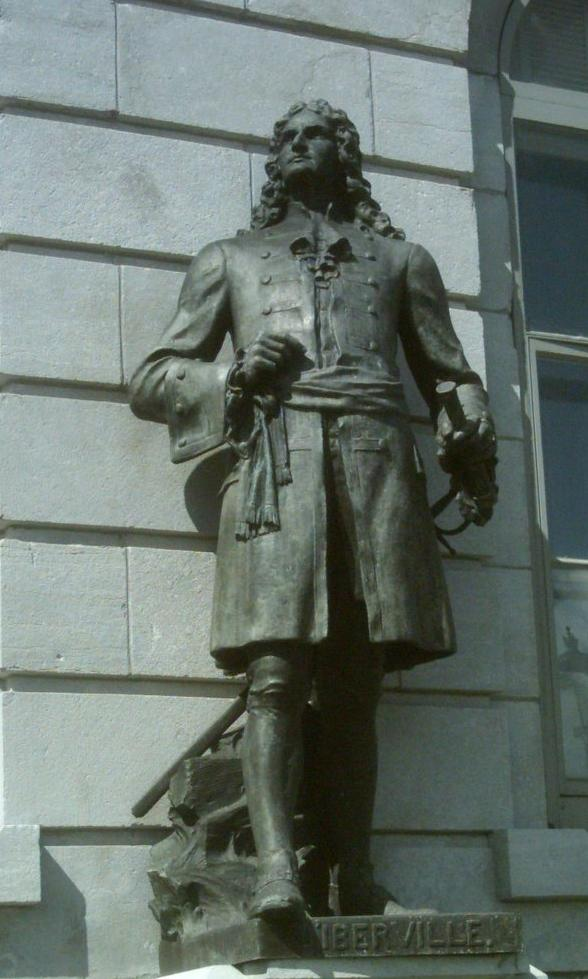
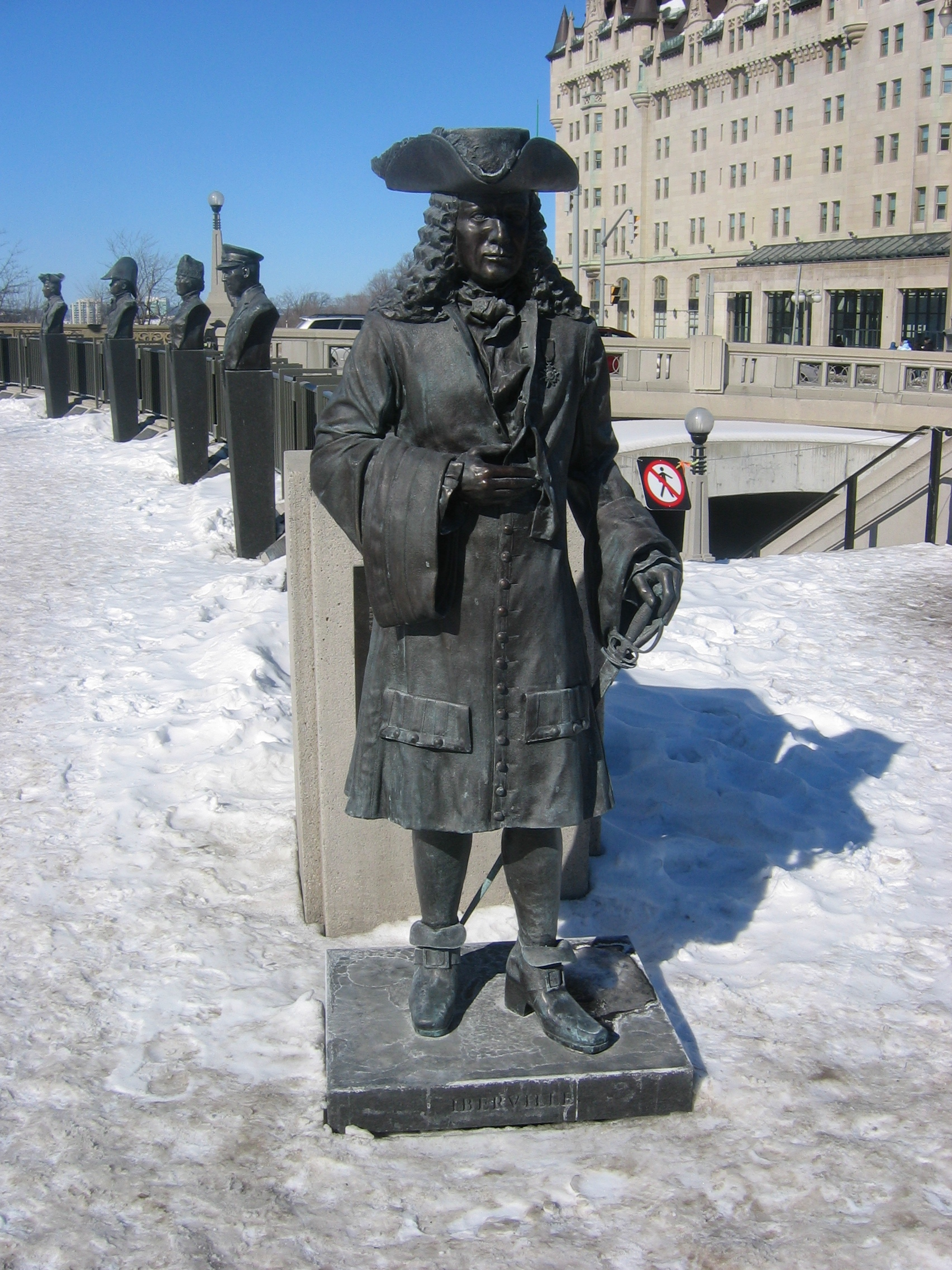
Statues of d'Iberville at Quebec's Parliament Building in Quebec City (left), and at Valiants Memorial in Ottawa.

The following works and sites are named for d'Iberville:

- D'Iberville, a 39 episode television series on Radio-Canada from 1967 to 1968
- The city of Iberville, Quebec, now a district of Saint-Jean-sur-Richelieu
- A high school in Longueuil, Quebec, on the south shore of Montreal, is named after him.
- A secondary school in Rouyn-Noranda, Québec, bears the name D'Iberville
- Avenue Iberville, located in Shawinigan, Quebec, Canada
- Rue D'Iberville and the adjacent D'Iberville metro station in Montreal, Quebec
- The provincial electoral district of Iberville, Quebec
- Mont d'Iberville, the highest mountain in Quebec
- The city of D'Iberville, Mississippi
- Iberville Parish, Louisiana
- Iberville Street in New Orleans, Louisiana
- Rue d'Iberville in Chicoutimi, Québec
- Rue Iberville in Radisson, Québec
- Rue d'Iberville in Alma, Québec
- D'Iberville St. in Carbonear, Newfoundland
- A number of French ships, notably:
  - A torpedo aviso, one of the first French ships to be designated as a "contre-torpilleur" (destroyer)
  - A colonial sloop scuttled in Toulon harbor on 27 November 1942
- CCGS D'Iberville, Canadian Coast Guard icebreaker.
- Has a statue in Mobile erected in 2002, a gift from Hand Arendall, L.L.C.
- The cafeteria at Northwestern State University of Louisiana is named for him.
- Ibervillea, a genus of flowering plants belonging to the family Cucurbitaceae, from Central America and Mexico.

== See also ==
- Fort Gaines, Alabama
- D'Iberville (TV series)

== Bibliography ==
- Frégault, Guy. Iberville le conquérant. (Montréal, 1944).
