= Fort Albany (Ontario) =

1679 Historical trading post near Fort Albany First Nation

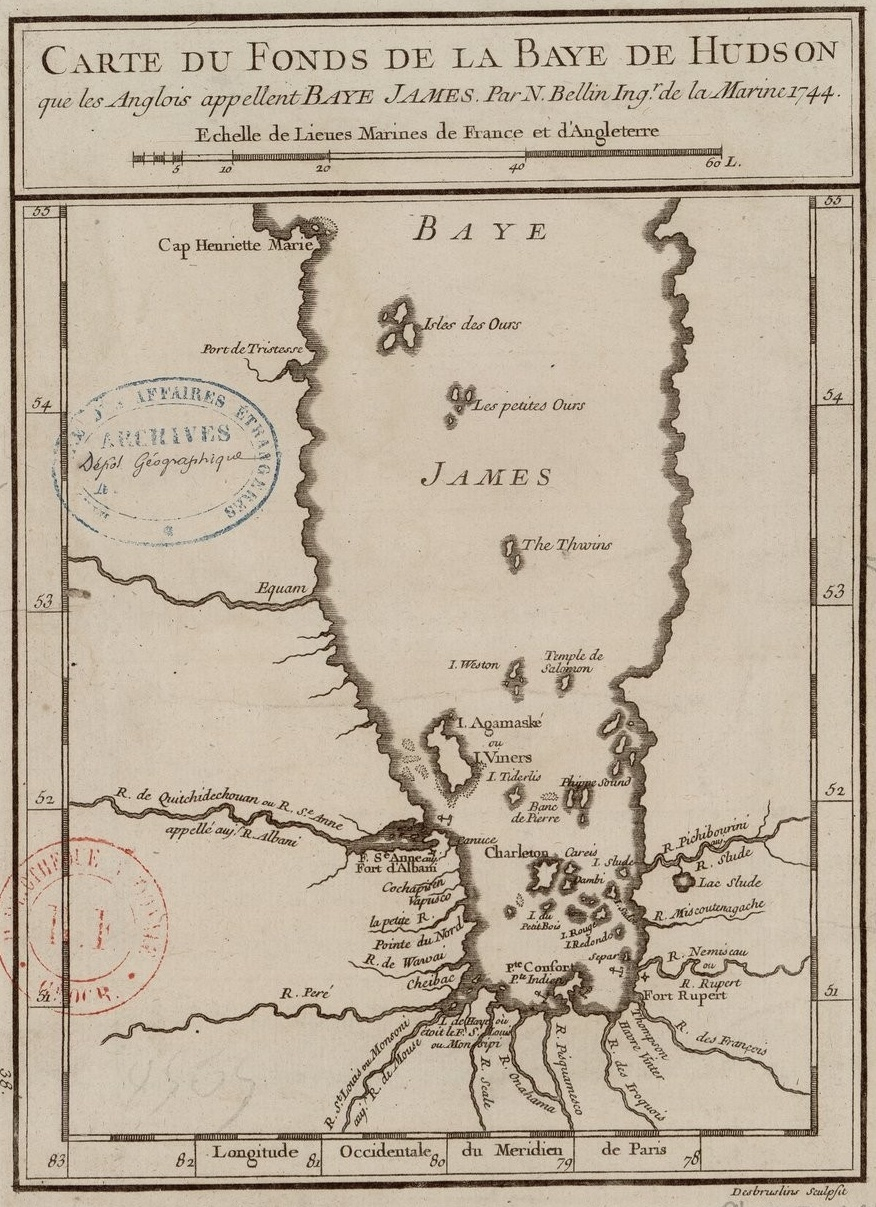
1744 Map of James Bay, including "Fort Saint-Anne", the French name for Fort Albany

Fort Albany was a Hudson's Bay Company trading post established in 1679 near the site of the present day Fort Albany First Nation. The fort was one of the oldest and most important of the Hudson's Bay Company's posts. It was also involved in Anglo-French tensions leading to the Battle of Fort Albany in 1688.

== History ==
Part of the Omushkegowuk territory around the mouth of the river they call Kistachowan (later Albany River) was explored by Charles Bayly, the first overseas governor of the Hudson's Bay Company (HBC), around 1675. The first Fort on the site was established in 1679. The fort was named in honour of Henry Stuart, 6th Duke of Albany.^{:39} It was one of the original Hudson's Bay Company trading posts, the others being Moose Factory on the south shore of James Bay, Charles Fort (later Rupert House) on the east, York Factory in the Port Nelson region, and New Severn (aka Fort Severn).^{:21} In these early days of the company, each fort was run by a governor, who served for a number of years and oversaw the company employees, managing the trade of their fort.^{:22}

The original fort was built inland from the mouth of the Albany River, partly for defense, and moved several times. Ships from England had to lay at the river mouth at Albany Roads. In 1683, Governor Henry Sergeant was directed to make it the primary trading post of the Hudson's Bay Company; it was the largest fort on the Bay at that point, with four bastions and forty-three guns.^{:51} In 1684 a Monsieur Péré reached the fort from French Canada. He was arrested and his two companions were sent to Charlton Island. In 1685, the French built Fort des Français at the juncture of the Albany and Kenogami Rivers to block the indigenous people from coming north to trade with the HBC.

=== Nine Years' War ===
In 1686, all three posts on James Bay (Moose Factory, Rupert House, and Fort Albany) were captured by an overland expedition from Quebec. Fort Albany was named Fort Saint-Anne by the French. In 1688 the English sent ships to reestablish their posts but were defeated by French ships that had come to re-supply the forts. In 1693 the English retook the fort and held it thereafter.^{:52} By the 1697 Treaty of Ryswick, Albany was to be returned to the French, but nothing was done before the war resumed in 1702. 1705 is the year of fort's establishment given in a historical report held in Fort Albany First Nation's archives.^{:48} In 1709 the French tried and failed to capture the fort. In 1713 the Treaty of Utrecht gave Hudson and James Bays (along with the rest of Rupert's Land) to the English.

=== Expansion of the fur trade ===
Following the end of decades of conflict with the French, sloops from Albany traded along the east coast until a new post was built on the Eastmain River in 1723-24 and Moose Factory was reestablished in 1730. By 1771, one ship serviced Albany, Moose Factory, and the East Main sub-house on the east shore.^{:112}

During the 18th century, trade between the Cree and the Hudson's Bay Company continued. In the 1720s and 1730s, 50% of the value of all trade to the Cree at Fort Albany was arms, while cloth and blankets accounted for approximately 25%. This pattern had reversed by the 1780s, when arms accounted for less than 25% and cloth and blankets more than 75% of the trade to the Cree from Fort Albany. By the 1790s, the Cree were using European cloth to make jackets and other clothes, which had acquired ceremonial and practical significance.^{:49}

Around the mid-1700s, the company's policy was to primarily engage in trade with indigenous people at their forts on the coast. By 1743, Chief Factor Joseph Isbister had found that trade at Albany was being undercut by coureurs des bois that had established trading posts upriver from the fort. So, going against company policy, he took a team 160 miles up river to establish the subsidiary Henley House and re-establish HBC authority. This policy officially changed in the 1770s, and the company began establishing series of inland posts that fed into the coastal forts and factories, which would function as depots for storage and ports for trade back to Europe. According to a report by long-time company factor Andrew Graham, by 1771, around the time of the change in policy, Fort Albany was staffed by 30 men in addition to the chief factor and his officers, and oversaw the sub-houses Henley House and East Main, each with eleven men governed by a sloop master.^{:111}

Another official policy of the company was to not allow any of the indigenous people they traded with into any forts. This policy, relaxed by Chief Factor George Spence (1747-1752), was strictly enforced by Chief Factor Joseph Isbister when he returned to the fort in 1752. This sudden removal of access to Fort Albany and Henley House angered Wappisis, a Cree man influential over the indigenous people of the area, and in December 1754 he and a few others destroyed Henley House, killing the five HBC men there and raiding the stores, threatening death to anyone that told the Company people that they had done it. Wappisis went to Albany in May 1755 to trade and attempted to blame "French Indians" for the destruction of Henley House. Isbister heard in June from another indigenous person that Wappisis had done it, and Isbister hanged Wappisis and his two sons on June 21, 1755. The employees at Moose and Albany were concerned following the destruction of Henley House, since this was the first such incident of indigenous violence in the company's history. Henley House was re-established under Chief Factor Humphrey Marten by 1768.

In 1777, Gloucester House was built 243 miles upriver from Henley House and in 1786, Osnaburgh House was built at the outflow of Lake St. Joseph. This westward expansion significantly increased the trade of Fort Albany. In 1793, the Governor of Albany Fort established posts on the Rainy River and Winnipeg River. Posts supplied from the HBC-run Fort Albany competed with North West Company men from Lake Superior and even HBC posts supplied from York Factory, until the union of the two companies in 1821.

According to a historical report held by Fort Albany First Nation, by 1800, there were around 200 Homeland Cree (25 to 30 families) who lived close to the post and provided the Company employees with food.^{:48}

Fort Albany was the headquarters of the Albany District of the Hudson's Bay Company, which, as of 1830, bordered Severn District to its northwest, Moose District to its southeast, the far western reaches of Upper Canada to its south, Lac La Pluie District to its southwest, and Winnipeg District to its west. The east-flowing Albany River drew furs from as far west as Lake St. Joseph. From there, a portage ran west to Lac Seul, the English River, the Winnipeg River and beyond. A north-flowing branch, the Kenogami River led upstream toward Lake Superior at Wawa, Ontario and another branch, the Ogoki River led toward Lake Nipigon.

=== Decline of the fur trade ===
In 1821, the HBC merged with the North West Company. Around this time, the quantity of animals to hunt, such as goose, beaver, moose, and caribou in Albany District was extremely low. To try to curb the extinction of fur-bearing animals, the HBC Governor George Simpson established beaver preserves throughout the district. This period of scarcity was also a time of increased religious conversions by Anglican, Methodist, Presbyterian, and Jesuit missionaries up and down the Hudson and James Bay coast. One Methodist missionary, George Barnley, held mass baptisms at communities along the coast, including 89 in two days at Fort Albany. Journalist Tanya Talaga theorizes that a possible motivation for the many conversions was to go along with what the Europeans wanted to make trade easier.^{:97} There also emerged Omushkego preachers, most notably Abishabis, who in the early 1840s began spreading his own gospel among the Cree, acting like a prophet and calling himself Jesus Christ, alongside another man calling himself Wasiteck "The Light." Another missionary was James Evans, who introduced his syllabics writing system to the Omushkegowuk.^{:78-82}

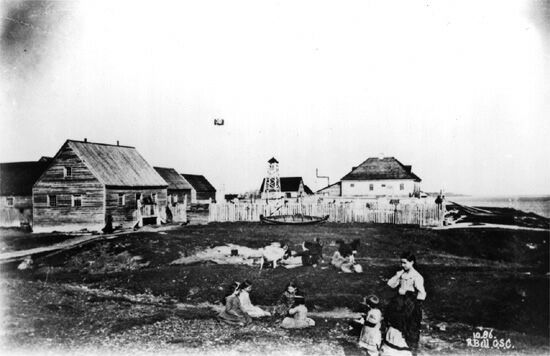
Fort Albany, 1886

After the Slavery Abolition Act 1833 and a diminishing demand for furs, HBC's business had declined sharply. In 1868, the Hudson's Bay Company surrendered their North American territory known as Rupert's Land to Great Britain, which then gave it to the newly-formed Dominion of Canada with an 1869 "deed of surrender."^{:98-99} Following this transfer to the Dominion, the province of Ontario engaged in litigation, arbitration, and negotiation to define its northern and western borders. In 1878, arbitrators granted Ontario territory north to the English and Albany rivers, causing Fort Albany to become part of the province. Meanwhile, in 1876, the Indian Act had become law in Canada. The first official census of the area was conducted in 1881, which listed 679 "Indians" residing at Albany Factory, not including native wives and children of white people. Fort Albany First Nation's historical report estimates an "aboriginal population of at least 1000" around this time, many of whom had come all the way from Attawapiskat.^{:48} The Canada (Ontario Boundary) Act, 1889 officially expanded the province of Ontario north to Albany River and west to Lake of the Woods. At the suggestion of magistrate E. B. Borron, Ontario initially allowed the old HBC regime to manage the territory, until the province was able to more substantially take on its management, which began by appointing HBC officers as justices of the peace.

=== Treaty No. 9 ===
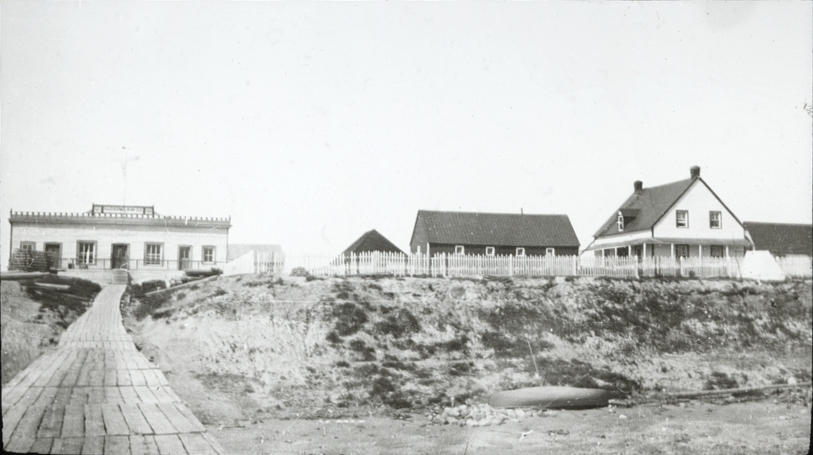
Hudson's Bay Company store (left) and houses (right) at Fort Albany c. 1900s

In 1905, Treaty 9 was signed by the Indigenous people living around Fort Albany, who had become concentrated in the area over the past few decades and who had been seeking a binding agreement with the government to protect their way of life. The signature of this treaty marked the legal creation of Fort Albany First Nation.

== See also ==
- List of Chief Factors of Fort Albany
