= Charles Noble =

Charles or Charlie Noble may refer to:

- Charles Noble (cricketer) (1850–1927), English cricketer
- Charles Albert Noble (1867–1962), American mathematician
- Charles C. Noble (1916–2003), American general and engineer who worked on the Manhattan Project
- Charles Sherwood Noble (1873–1957), invented a minimum disturbance cultivator called the Noble blade
- Charles Noble (politician) (1797–1874), Michigan politician
- Charles Wycliffe Noble (1925–2017), musician and architect
- Charlie Noble (chimney), the smoke stack on a ship's galley
- Charlie Noble (visual effects artist), British visual effects artist
- Charlie Mary Noble (1877–1959), American teacher in astronomy and mathematics education
- Chuck Noble (1931–2011), American basketball player
