= Waskaganish =

Waskaganish ᐙᔅᑳᐦᐄᑲᓂᔥ (Cree)
- Terre réservée crie (Cree reserved land)
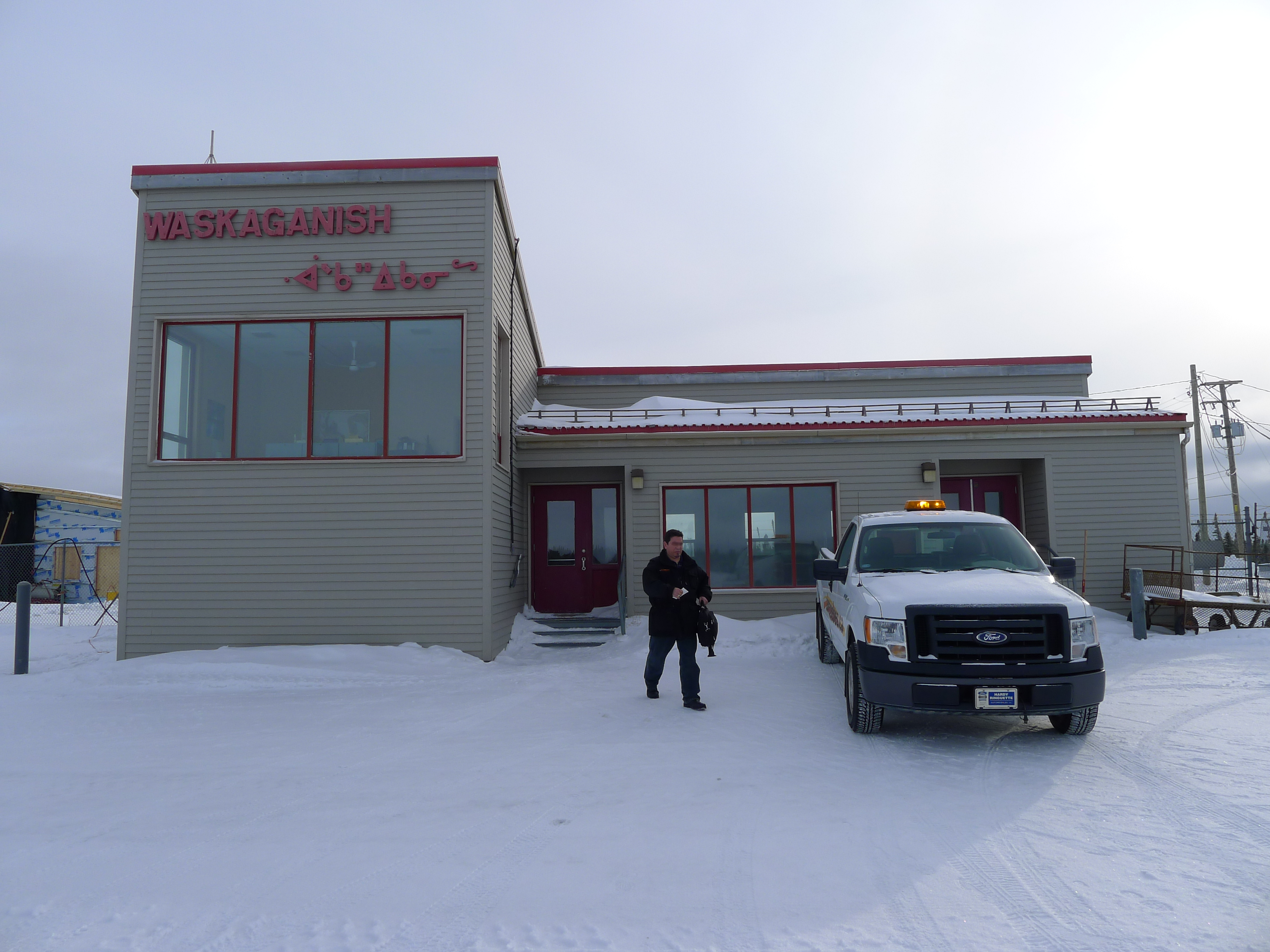
- Waskaganish Airport

- Flag

- Location within Quebec
- Coordinates: 51°29′N 078°45′W
- Country: Canada
- Province: Quebec
- Region: Northern Quebec
- TE: Eeyou Istchee
- Formed: 1978

Government
  - Type: Cree reserved land
  - Chief: Greta Whiskeychan Cheechoo
  - Federal riding: Abitibi—Baie-James—Nunavik—Eeyou
  - Prov. riding: Ungava

Area
  - Total: 492.43 km^{2} (190.13 sq mi)
  - Land: 496.99 km^{2} (191.89 sq mi)

Population (2021)
  - Total: 2,536
  - Density: 5.1/km^{2} (13/sq mi)
- Time zone: UTC−05:00 (EST)
  - Summer (DST): UTC−04:00 (EDT)
- Postal Code: J0M 1R0
- Area code: 819
- Website: www.waskaganish.ca

Waskaganish (Cree: ᐙᔅᑳᐦᐄᑲᓂᔥ/wâskâhîkaniš, Little House; French pronunciation: [waskaɡaniʃ]) is a Cree community of over 2,500 people at the mouth of the Rupert River on the south-east shore of James Bay in Nord-du-Québec, Canada. Waskaganish is part of the territory referred to as "Eeyou Istchee" ("The Land of the People" in Cree) encompassing the traditional territories of Cree people in the James Bay regions of what is now Northern Quebec and Ontario.

The community of Waskaganish celebrated its 350th year anniversary in 2018. The village is located at the site of the former Fort Rupert, the first Hudson's Bay Company trading post on Hudson Bay.

== History ==
=== Pre-contact ===
Human presence in the James Bay area is believed to have begun some 7000 years ago, although the earliest artefacts recently found in the region of Waskaganish date to some 3000-3500 years old. Aboriginal hunting groups migrated from the south and west, first as seasonal hunting parties and later permanently establishing themselves in what is known as Eeyou Istchee (the Cree traditional territory in eastern James Bay). Although populations fluctuated over the centuries, the pre-contact period is characterized by a subsistence economy based on hunting and trapping of small and large game, fishing and seasonal gathering.

According to a study on aboriginal fur trade, Cree hunting groups of three or four families moved from traditional seasonal fishing and hunting camps. They often stayed close to watersheds.

In 2012, a local resident of Waskaganish found rough-looking stone blades and arrowheads at the Saunders Goose Pond on Waskaganish territory that could be between 4,000 and 7,000 years old. In 2012 archaeological teams were digging near the Smokey Hill rapids, about 20 km from Waskaganish, a traditional weir fishing site where families have gathered annually in late summer for generations. Prior to construction of the hydroelectric project and the partial diversion of the Rupert River which exposed the shoreline, the natural current forced fish into the weir. After the diversion, scoop-net fishing pools were unusable. By 2011, there were larger concentrations of cisco at Gravel Pit although they were smaller than they had been previous years.

Pre-contact trade relations between Cree and other aboriginal groups were "mostly centered on trading moose hides for ‘cereals’, ‘indian corn’, and tobacco." There was a pre-contact intertribal Cree-Montagnais trade route from Waskaganish to the Saint Lawrence River via Rupert River and the Saguenay River.

=== Post-contact ===
It was hypothesized that Henry Hudson's fateful over-wintering in 1610-1611 was in Waskaganish territory. In 1610, Hudson had reached what is now the Hudson Strait, but by November, his new ship, Discovery, had become icebound in James Bay and they were forced to move ashore.

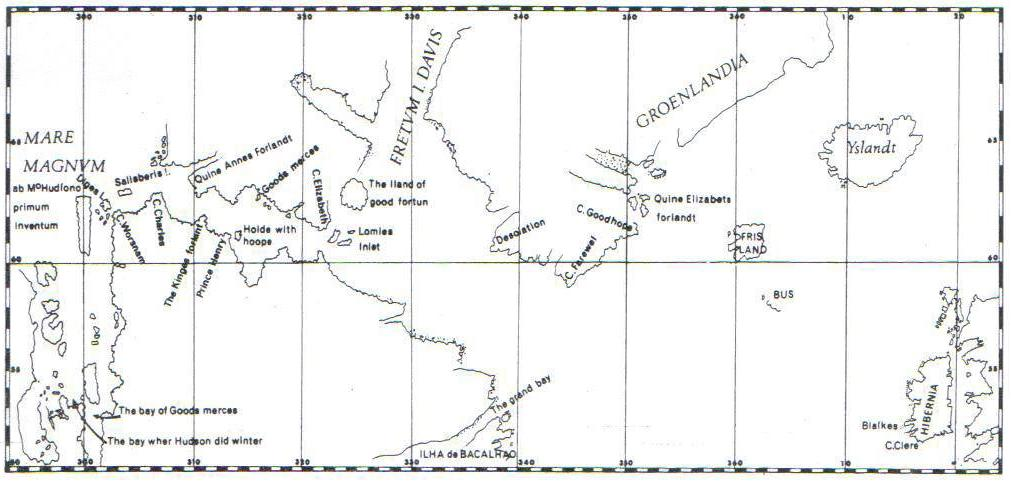
A map of Hudson's fourth voyage

On 29 September 1668, Nonsuch, under the command of Zachariah Gillam and guided by Médard des Groseilliers, anchored at the mouth of the Rupert River. In 1668, Rupert House or Charles Fort at Waskaganish on the south bank of Rupert River, was established as the first trading post, two years before the Hudson's Bay Company was formed. In October 1669 they returned to England with a load of beaver pelts they had acquired from the Cree people in exchange for goods such as knives, kettles, beads, needles and blankets. This led to the English taking possession of the Hudson's Bay watershed, forming Rupert's Land under the administration of the Hudson's Bay Company in 1670. The post was occupied sporadically thereafter and new buildings were added. By the 1680s, there were a string of trading posts on James Bay Cree traditional land and the Cree had an extensive trade alliance with the HBC. As middlemen, the Cree hunters, trappers and traders collected furs from other First Nations in the interior. As the first trappers with the HBC, the Cree became the homeguard for the HBC, helping with the supply and maintenance of the trading posts in winter.

In 1670-1679, Charles Bayly was governor. In 1672, Charles Albanel reached Charles Fort from the Saint Lawrence region. Finding all the English out hunting, he waited a week, left a letter, and returned to Quebec. In 1674, Albanel reached the fort again and was sent to England. In 1681, fearing French attack, a new Charles Fort was built downstream on a hill top. In 1686 the French captured the fort and burned it. In 1688, the English tried to re-establish the fort, but D'Iberville captured it again, this time from the sea. For the next century, the east coast of James Bay was visited by HBC ships from Fort Albany.

In 1776 the site was re-occupied and named Rupert House or Rupert Fort or Fort Rupert. From then until the early 1900s, Fort Rupert was an important trading location, supplying inland communities and other posts via the Rupert River with regular canoe brigades. In 1991, the archaeologist J. V. Chism found the sites of the two Charles Forts. The first was at the site of the new tourist lodge (Auberge Kanio Kashee Lodge) and the second at the Anglican church.

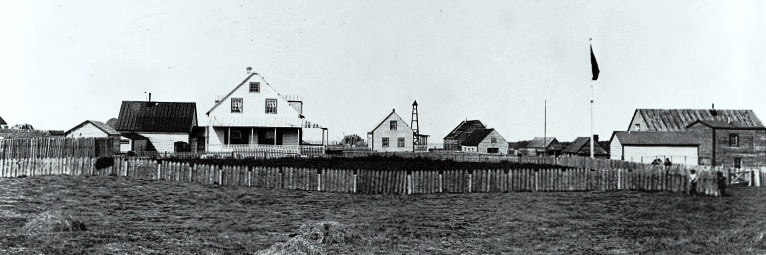
Manager's house and other buildings, Rupert House, circa 1921

=== Contemporary history ===
==== James Bay Project and James Bay Northern Quebec Agreement (JBNQA) ====
Life for the Cree people of Waskaganish and Eeyou Istchee was greatly impacted by The James Bay Project. Although the project was celebrated by mainstream media as "The Project of the Century," the Cree people had not agreed to its construction. In fact, they had not been consulted at all or even made aware of the project's existence until construction had already begun. One major point of contention had to do with land use rights. The land surrounding James Bay had been the traditional territory of Cree and Inuit for thousands of years. Compared to other areas of Canada, where treaties had been established that (at least in theory) clarified indigenous peoples' and European settlers' rights to land, no such agreements had ever been established in Eeyou Istchee. As such, the stakeholders in the James Bay Project (Hydro Quebec and the Government of Quebec) had no established legal right to the land on which they had already begun constructing the largest hydro-electric project ever built.

In response to the project, the Cree people formed the Grand Council of the Crees and elected Billy Diamond as Grand Chief to represent the people of Eeyou Istchee in dealings with the Quebec government. In addition to land use rights, the Cree expressed concerns about irreparable damage to the environment, destruction of traditional hunting and fishing areas, and impacts on the traditional Cree way of life.

Ultimately the Cree people of Eeyou Istchee and the Grand Council were unable to prevent the construction of the dam. However, through negotiations, they established the historic James Bay Northern Quebec Agreement (JBNQA) which contained provisions about land use, economic development, self-governance of indigenous peoples, and funding for cultural, social, and health services for beneficiaries. Although there were initial difficulties in getting the treaty obligations ratified, funding related to the JBNQA allowed for significant improvements in living conditions for Cree communities, such as creation of water and sewer systems. It also led to the creation of the Cree Board of Health and Social Services of James Bay (CBHSSJB) and the Cree School Board (CSB).

==== Road access ====
Waskaganish became accessible by road in 2001, when a gravel access road connected the community to the James Bay Road. Prior to 2001, the community was only accessible by airplane or boat.

== Education ==
The Cree School Board operates two schools in Waskaganish: Annie Whiskeychan Memorial Elementary School (primary) (ᐋᓃ ᐧᐄᔥᑲᒑᓐ ᒋᔅᑯᑕᒫᒉᐅᑲᒥᒄ) and Wiinibekuu School (secondary) (ᐧᐄᓂᐯᑰ ᒋᔅᑯᑕᒫᒉᐅᑲᒥᒄ).

== Notable people ==
Billy Diamond was both the chief of the Waskaganish Cree starting in 1970 and the Grand Chief of the Grand Council of the Crees of Eeyou Istchee.

Filmmaker Neil Diamond was born and raised in Waskaganish. His experiences as a child there, watching Westerns with other local children in the church basement, inspired him to make Reel Injun.
