= John Abraham (politician) =

John Abraham (fl. 1672 – 1689) was a governor of the now abandoned Hudson's Bay Company settlement at Port Nelson (or Fort Nelson) on Hudson Bay, located in the northern part of the modern province of Manitoba.

== Biography ==
Immediately after joining the HBC in 1672, Abraham was sent to Hudson Bay, where he served under Governor Charles Bayly until 1678. In 1679, possibly as a result of Abraham's accusations of mismanagement, Bayly was recalled to London and replaced by John Nixon. Abraham held the position of Nixon's second-in-command until 1681, when he was assigned to The Diligence under the command Captain Nehemiah Walker.

Ignoring Nixon's criticisms of him, the HBC promoted Abraham to Captain of The George in 1683 and set sail for Port Nelson, where a fort had been established the previous year by Governor John Bridgar. Upon his arrival, Abraham discovered that the HBC's post had been routed by Pierre Esprit Radisson and Médard des Groseilliers, French agents competing with the HBC. Due to this and the fact that Bridgar had been captured and taken to Quebec by Radisson and Des Groseilliers, Abraham assumed command of Port Nelson. He spent the next winter contending with Jean-Baptiste Chouart, Des Groseilliers's son, for control of the region. Abraham decided to sail back to England in the spring of 1684, but returned to Port Nelson when he received a commission as governor from the HBC while en route. During his first official weeks as governor Fort York was constructed under the supervision of George Geyer. Also during this time, Abraham repulsed an attack carried out by Claude de Bermen de la Martinière of the French La Compagnie du Nord. The following winter saw minor skirmishes and increased tensions with the French.

In 1685, the HBC committee decided to replace Abraham with Governor Thomas Phipps because he had abandoned Port Nelson in 1684 before receiving word from England. He acted as Phipps deputy until 1688, when he was recalled. The HBC decided to do this for two reasons: they considered his opposition to the French in the winter of 1684-85 had been unjustified considering his stronger position and certain reports he had made lead them to believe that he was planning to mount an interloping expedition. These fears did not prove unfounded when, in 1688, Abraham, along with John Outlaw, sailed The Mary to Hudson Bay intent on infringing upon the HBC's charter. However, the expedition did not go as planned when The Mary was wrecked by ice in the Hudson Strait. Before the ship sank, her crew and supplies were rescued by John Marsh, who had been tasked by the HBC settle in Albany River. Despite the English and French crowns enjoying a rare peace, Marsh's colony clashed with the local French and Abraham was given up as a hostage. At some point during his captivity, Abraham switched his allegiance and proceeded to prey upon English ships on the St. Lawrence River for the remainder of his life.
