= Jean-Eugène Buland =

French painter (1852–1926)

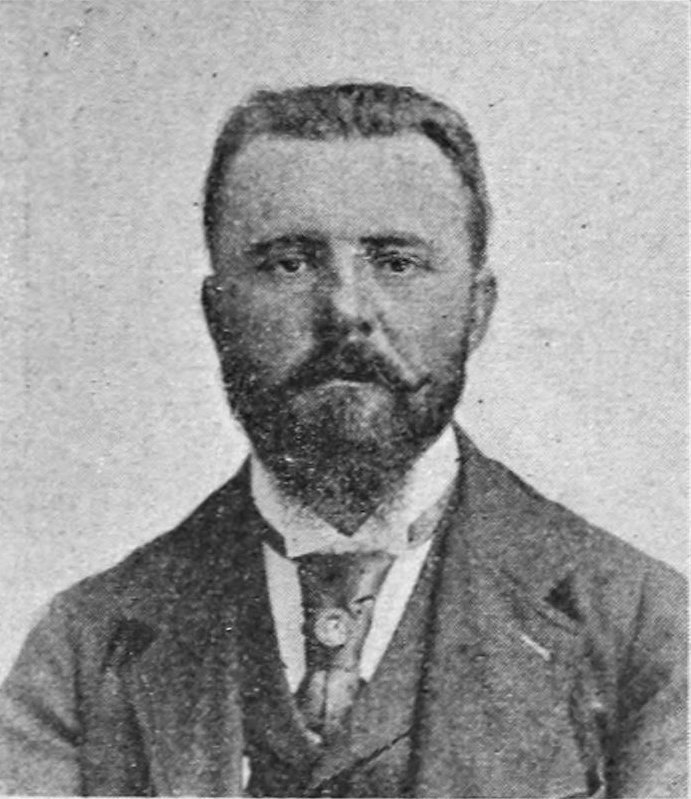
- Born: 26 October 1852; Paris, France
- Died: 18 March 1926 (aged 73); Charly-sur-Marne, France
- Movement: Naturalism
- Awards: Second Grand Prix de Rome; 1878 and 1879

Jean-Eugène Buland (26 October 1852 in Paris – 18 March 1926 in Charly-sur-Marne) was a French painter.

== Biography ==
The son of an engraver, Buland entered the École nationale supérieure des Beaux-Arts under the tutelage of Alexandre Cabanel. His earliest works were Symbolist paintings of antique scenes, but he quickly turned towards depicting scenes of everyday life.

He used photographs in order to paint with realism. He received the Second Grand Prix de Rome two years in a row, in 1878 and 1879. His participation in the Salon led to several awards: an honorable mention in 1879, a third-place medal in 1884, followed by a second-place medal in 1887. At the World's Fair in Paris in 1889 he was honoured with a silver medal. He was inducted into the Legion of Honour in 1894.

He profited from the commissions he received from major institutions such as the Musée du Luxembourg, and other museums in the provinces. He painted several panels of the Salon of Sciences at the Hôtel de Ville, Paris and decorated the ceiling of the city hall at Château-Thierry.

The Museum of Fine Arts of Carcassonne, which held his work Mariage Innocent (Innocent Marriage), devoted a retrospective to him from October 19, 2007, to January 19, 2008, publishing a catalogue for the occasion.

He was the brother of Jean-Émile Buland (1857–1938), an engraver and winner of the 1880 Prix de Rome.

== Works ==
- Offrande à la Vierge (Offering to the Virgin), 1879
- Offrande à Dieu (Offering to God), 1880
- L'annonciation (The Annunciation), 1881
- Les Fiancés (The Fiancés), 1881
- Jésus chez Marthe et Marie (Jesus at the home of Martha and Mary), 1882
- Mariage innocent (Innocent Marriage), 1884 Musée des Beaux-Arts de Carcassonne
- La Visite lendemain de noces (The Visit Following the Wedding), 1884
- L'annonciation (The Annunciation), 1885
- The Restitution à la Vierge (The Restitution to the Virgin), 1885
- C'est Celui-là (It's That One), 1886
- Les Héritiers (The Heirs), 1887, Bordeaux Museum
- Un Patron (The Lesson of the Apprentice), 1888, Nationalmuseum, Stockholm
- Propagande (Propaganda), 1889, Musée d'Orsay
- 'Auguste au tombeau d'Alexandre (Augustus at the Tomb of Alexander), Musée d'Orsay
- Déjeuner Des Laveuses (Lunch of the Washerwomen), 1900
- Conseil municipal et commission de Pierrelaye organisant la fête (Municipal and Commission Advice of Pierrelaye organizing the celebration), 1891, Hôtel de ville de Pierrelaye Val-d'Oise
- Un jour d'audience (A Day of Audience), 1895, Chi Mei Museum, Tainan, Taiwan
- Bretons en prière (Bretons in prayer), 1889, Museum of Fine Arts, Quimper
- Le Tripot (The Casino), 1883, Museum of Fine Arts, Quimper
- Flagrant délit (Flagrant Crime), 1893, Museum of Fine Arts, Quimper
- Bonheur des parents (Parent's Happiness), 1903

== Selected paintings ==
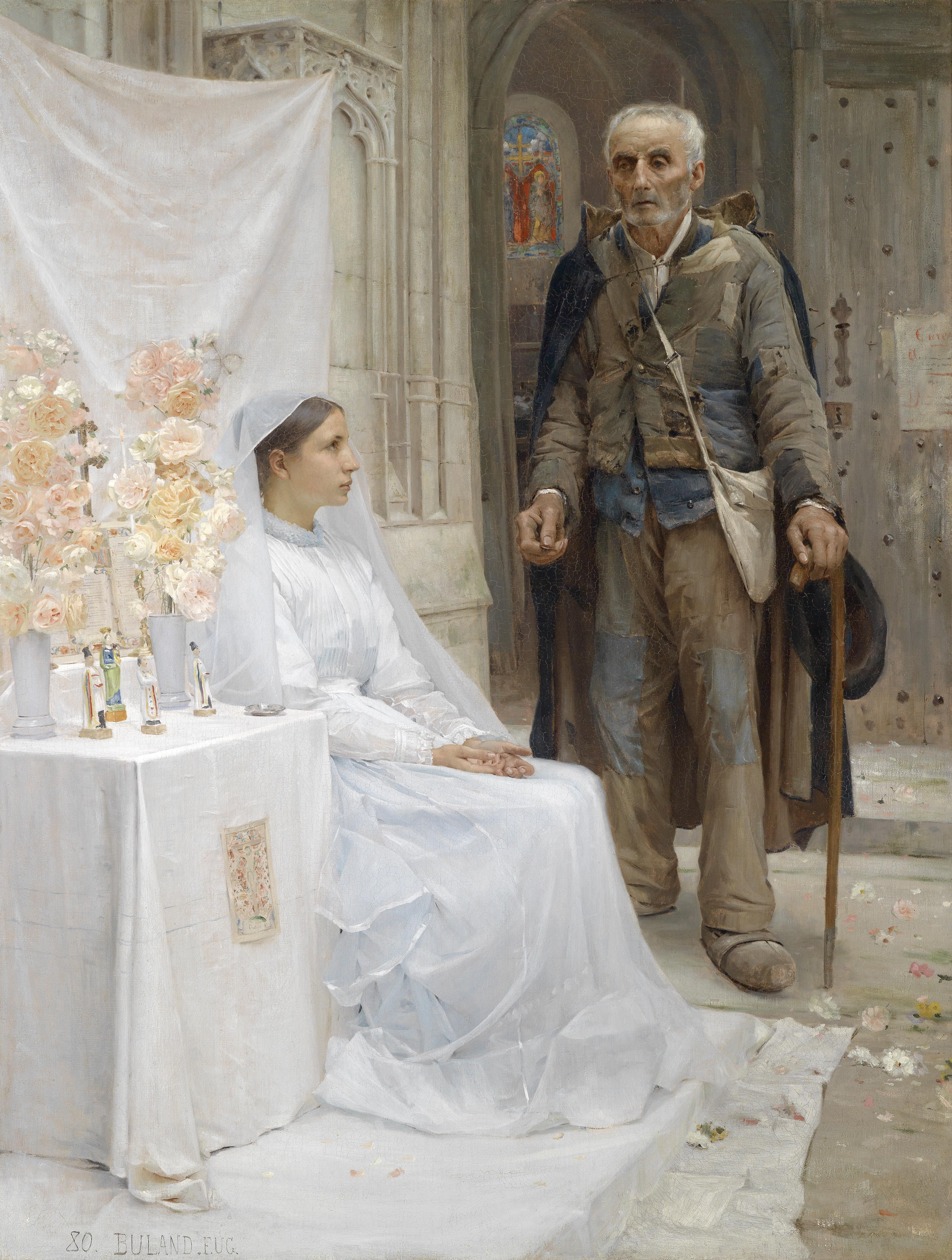
Jean Eugène Buland Alms of a Beggar, 1880

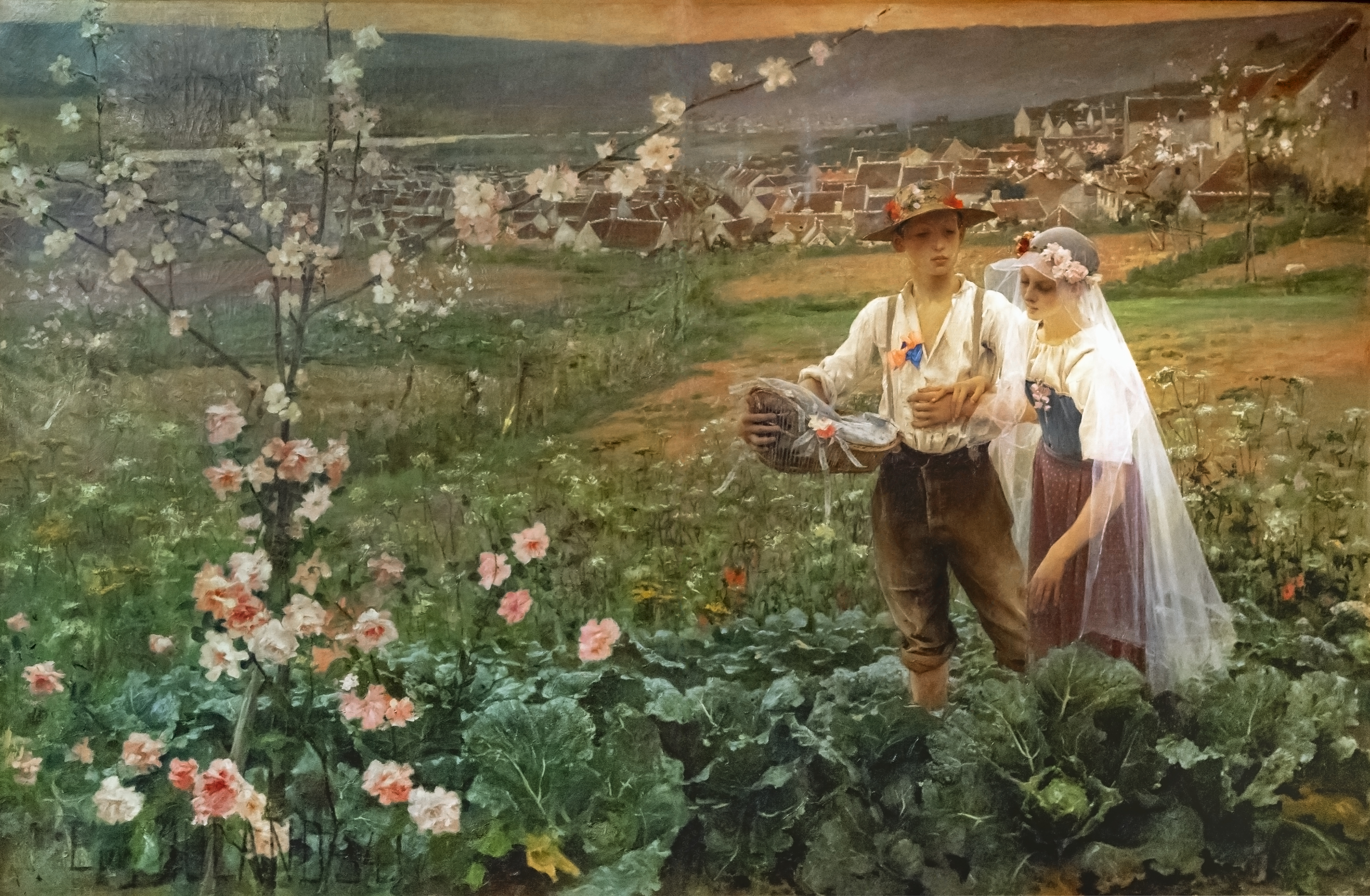
Mariage innocent (Innocent marriage), 1884 Musée des beaux-Arts de Carcassonne

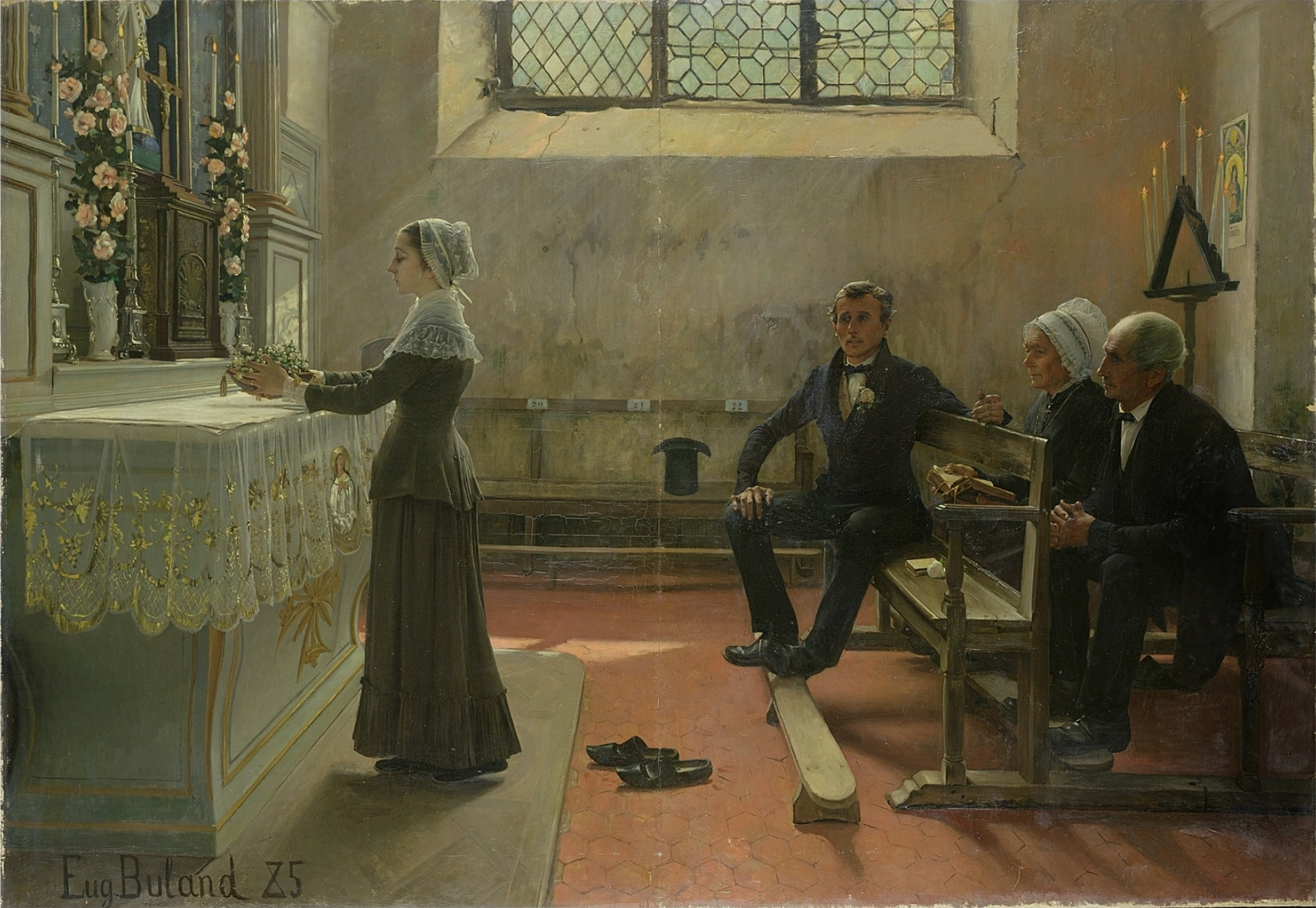
Offering to the Virgin, 1885

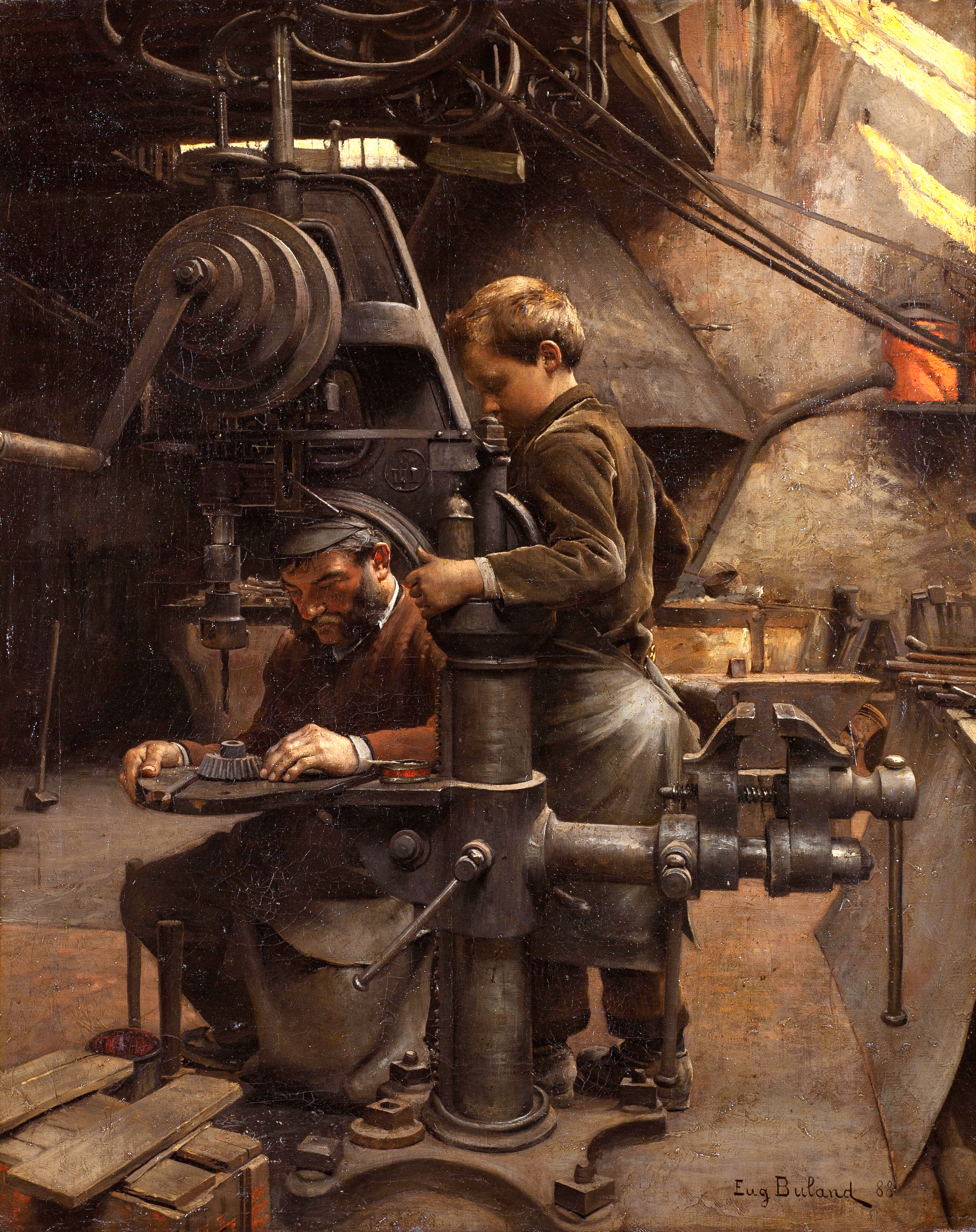
Un Patron, or The Lesson of the Apprentice (1888)

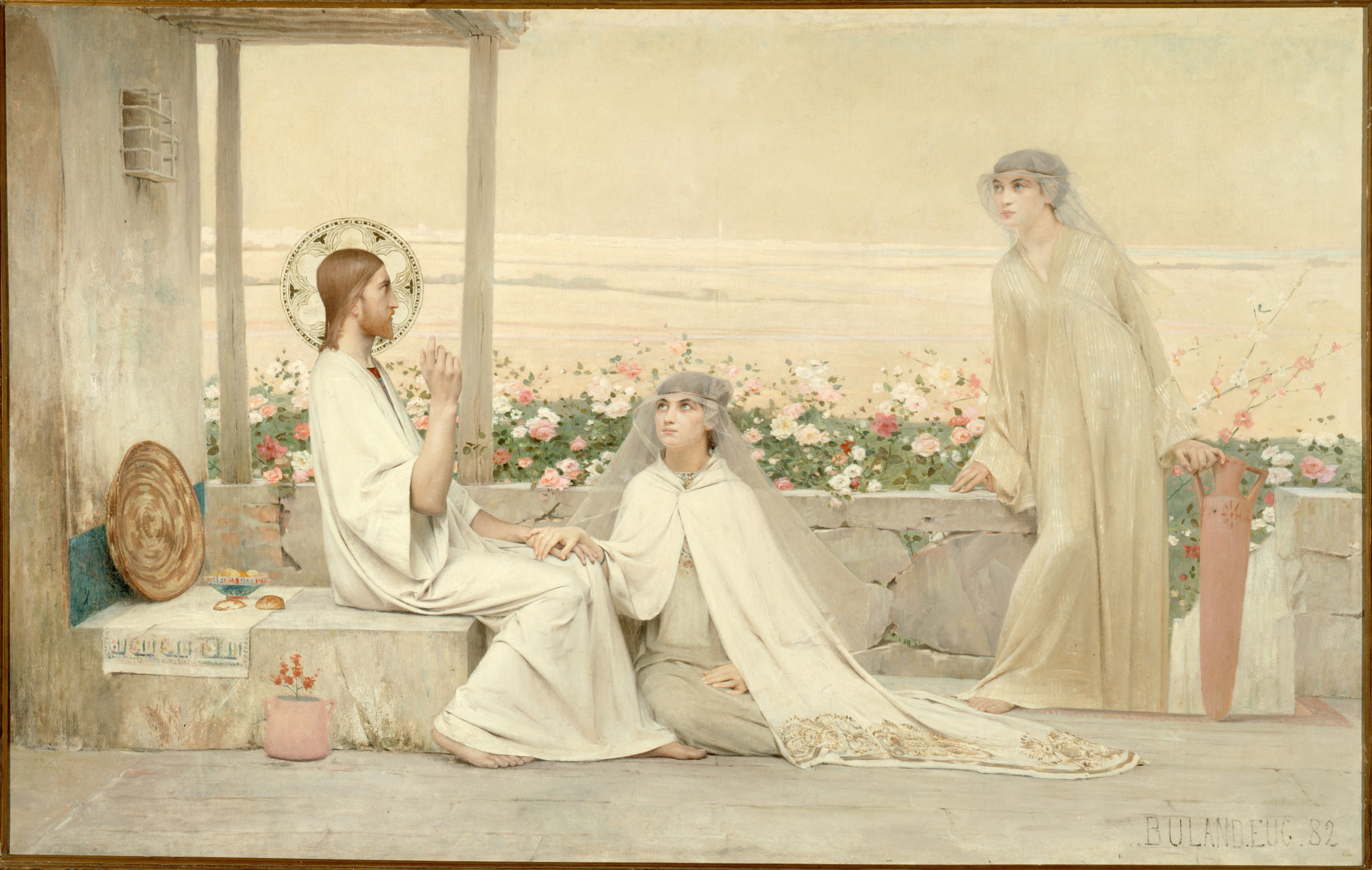
Christ in the house of Mary and Martha, 1882

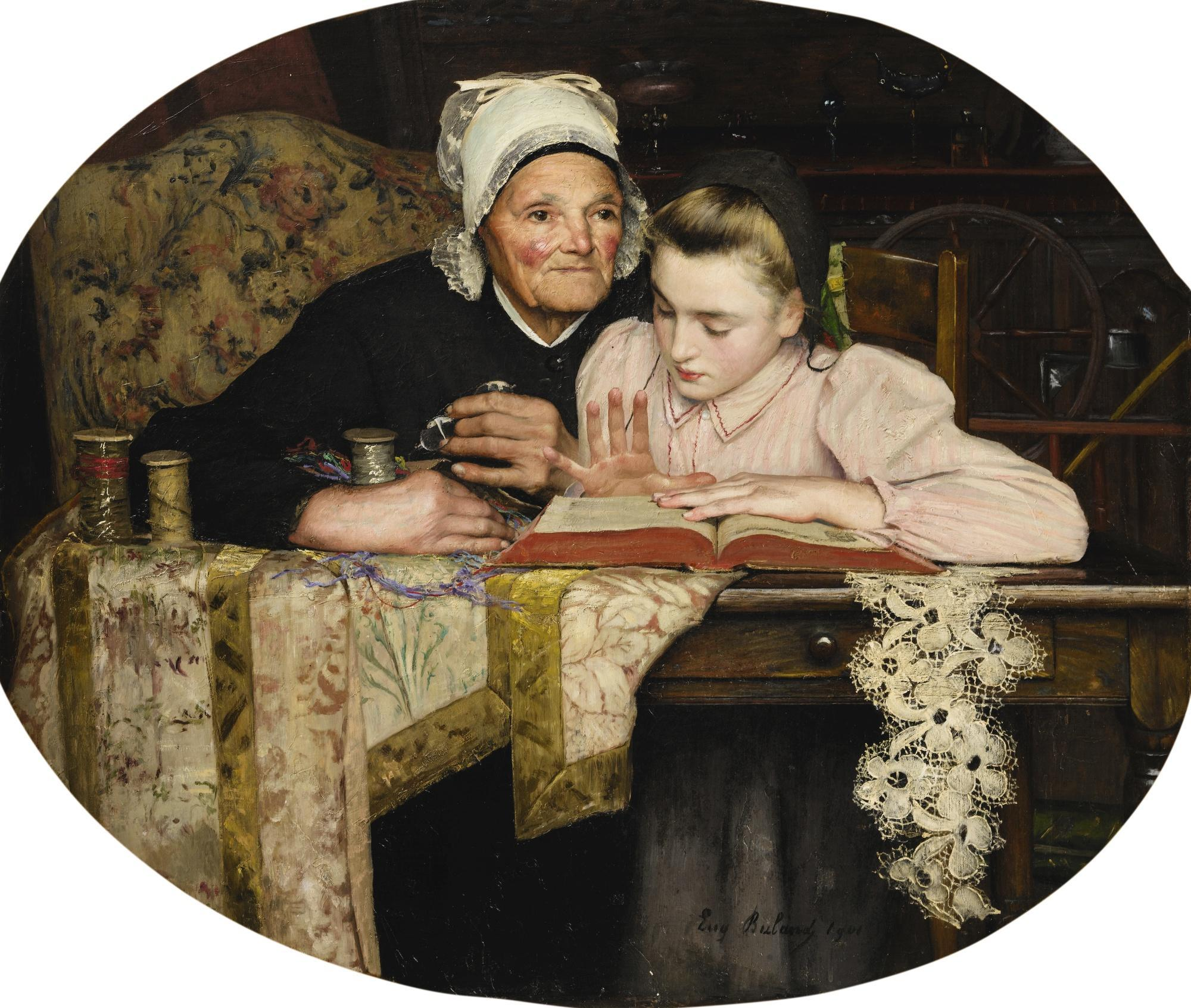
Reading, 1901

== Sources ==
- Cathy Pays, Eugène Buland 1852-1926 : Aux limites du réalisme, Éditions PanamaMusées, October 2007 (ISBN 2-7557-0281-8)
- Legion of Honour File of Jean-Eugène Buland
