= Zachariah Gillam =

Canadian ship captain (1636–1682)

Zachariah Gillam (also spelled Zachary Guillam) (1636–1682) was one of a family of New England sea captains involved in the early days of the Hudson's Bay Company.

== Biography ==
The son of a prominent Massachusetts shipwright, he was engaged in the coastal trade. He must have known about and may have had some involvement in Radisson and Groseilliers' 1663 attempt to reach Hudson Bay from Boston. In 1665 his elder brother carried Radisson and Groseilliers to England which presumably increased his contact with the two adventurers. In 1668, in command of the 43-ton Nonsuch he carried Groseilliers from England to Hudson Bay where they wintered at the mouth of the Rupert River and returned the following year with £1,300 in furs. In May 1670, the same month that the Hudson's Bay Company was founded, he left England in the 75½-ton Prince Rupert with Groseilliers accompanied by Wivenhoe with Radisson and the new governor Charles Bayly. Bayly's attempt to found a fort at Port Nelson, Manitoba failed, so they returned to the Rupert River where they wintered, traded, explored the Moose River (Ontario) and returned to England in October, 1671. He returned in Prince Rupert in 1672/73 and again in 1674/75. At about this time he quarreled with Radisson, each accusing the other of peculation, and Gillam was dismissed from the HBC service. He was engaged in the coastal trade to North Carolina from 1677 to 1680 when he was accused of involvement in the 1677 Culpeper's Rebellion and sent in custody to England. In 1682 he returned to the HBC service and in June of that year left for the bay in Prince Rupert along with four other ships. Prince Rupert and Albemarle were to found a post at Port Nelson, Manitoba. When he arrived on 7 September he found two other groups already there. One was French under Radisson and Groseilliers who had returned to the French service and the other was a non-HBC expedition from Boston under Gillam's son Benjamin. On 21 October, during a storm, Prince Rupert dragged anchor and drifted out to sea. With only about nine men on board it was difficult to control her and she was crushed by the ice, losing all hands including Captain Gillam.

His elder brother Benjamin Gillam was in 1665 in command of Charles which brought Radisson and Groseilliers to England where they began the foundation of the Hudson's Bay Company.

His son Benjamin Gillam (1662/63-1706) appears in the records only in reference to the 1682 events at Port Nelson. On 21 June 1682 he left Boston for Hudson Bay in Bachelor's Delight intending to break into the HBC monopoly. On reaching Port Nelson he was soon joined by a French group under Radisson and then by his father's official HBC expedition. His father died in October and Benjamin was captured by the French in February. He was taken to Quebec, released and returned to Boston. Here he was briefly arrested for violating the monopoly but was soon released. The HBC later claimed him for its own and based its claim to Port Nelson on the grounds that Benjamin had arrived before the French party.

In 1690 the family appears in the records as shipbuilders for English merchants.
