= Pierre Allemand =

Pierre Allemand (Allemand) (c. 1662 – 27 May 1691) was a French ship pilot, cartographer, and fur trader in North America during the 17th century.

Allemand was born in France and sailed across the Atlantic many times. In 1681 he was recorded as living in Quebec. He went on several expeditions to Hudson Bay to trade furs and explore the region. He later wrote memoirs of his journeys and opened a business in France. He returned to North America to escort Jean-Baptiste de La Croix de Chevrières de Saint-Vallier in the region.

== Family and early life ==
Allemand was born c. 1662 in Saint-Sauveur-de-Nuaillé, France. His father was Claude Allemand and his mother was Marie Mandet. There is little information about his early life, although it is known that he traveled from Europe to North America several times. He is recorded in the 1681 census as living in Quebec and being 18 years old.

== Travels to Hudson Bay ==
In July 1682, Allemand was a pilot on an expedition to Hudson Bay led by Pierre-Esprit Radisson and Médard des Groseilliers. The expedition returned to Quebec in October 1683 with English prisoners, a large number of furs, and Allemand sailing with other crewmen upon a captured English ship.

Allemand's second expedition to Hudson Bay in 1684 was led by Claude de Bermen de la Martinière. Allemand spent the winter trading furs and created a map of the Hayes River region from the information he obtained from the Indigenous people. At one point, he was sent by the French to be an envoy to John Bridgar to settle a dispute along the river. He became sick when he returned from the voyage and was unable to complete the map of the area.

Allemand was a quartermaster on his third expedition to Hudson Bay in 1686 under the command of Pierre de Troyes, Chevalier de Troyes. The expedition sailed up the Ottawa River and captured a ship from the English at Fort Charles; Allemand piloted the ship upon its capture. He returned to Montreal in October.

== Personal life ==
On 13 November 1685, Allemand married Louise Douaire de Bondy in Quebec. They had five children.

== Later career and death ==
Allemand wrote a memoir, which was sent to the Minister of the Marine in 1687. In the memoir, he proposed creating a nautical chart of the Gulf of St. Lawrence and St. Lawrence River. He also taught navigation to the men of the New France colony.

Allemand went to France in the spring of 1688, wrote a second memoir and opened a brickworks business with a man named Landron. He returned to North America in 1689 to escort Jean-Baptiste de La Croix de Chevrières de Saint-Vallier on a tour of Acadia and the Newfoundland island. Later that year, he was given a parcel of land so that he could fish in the Gulf of St. Lawrence and off the Newfoundland coast.

Allemand died on 27 May 1691, in Quebec.
