= John Abraham (disambiguation) =

John Abraham (born 1972) is a Bollywood actor

John Abraham can also refer to:

- John Abraham (director) (1937–1987), Malayali Indian filmmaker and scriptwriter
- John Abraham (American football) (born 1978), retired NFL defensive end for the New York Jets, Atlanta Falcons, and Arizona Cardinals
- John Abraham (politician) (died 1689), Hudson's Bay Company governor of Port Nelson
- John Abraham (engineer) (fl. 2002), American mechanical engineering professor at the University of Saint Thomas
- John Braham (tenor) (1774–1856), English vocalist, born John Abraham
- John Abraham, Indian American former mayor of Teaneck, New Jersey

== See also ==
- John Abrahams (born 1952), South African-born cricketer
- Jon Abrahams (born 1977), American actor
- John Braham (disambiguation)
