= Grosilliers Lake =

Lake in the state of Minnesota, United States

- Location within Minnesota Location within the United States
- Location: Clearwater County, Minnesota
- Coordinates: 47°9′49″N 95°12′51″W
- Type: lake
- Basin countries: United States
- Surface elevation: 1,568 ft (478 m)

Grosilliers Lake is a lake in Clearwater County, Minnesota, in the United States.

Grosilliers Lake was named for Médard des Groseilliers, a French explorer, although the spelling is different.

== See also ==
- List of lakes in Minnesota
