= John Braham =

John Braham may refer to:

- John Braham (MP) (died 1420), MP for Suffolk
- John Braham (tenor) (c.1774–1856), English opera singer
- John Joseph Braham, Sr. (1847–1919), Anglo-American composer and conductor
- John Braham (RAF officer) (1920–1974), British fighter pilot

== See also ==
- John Abraham (disambiguation)
