= Jean-Émile Buland =

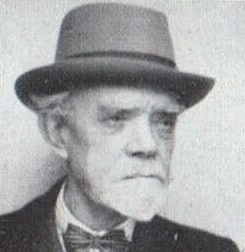
- Jean-Émile Buland (date unknown)
- Born: October 25, 1857; Paris, France
- Died: February 15, 1938 (aged 80); Paris, France
- Education: École des Beaux-Arts
- Known for: Painting, engraving, lithography, illustration
- Spouse: Louise Godefroy (m. 1886)
- Children: 1
- Parents: Jean-Marie Buland (father); Suzanne Wagener (mother)
- Relatives: Jean-Eugène Buland (brother)
- Elected: Académie des Beaux-Arts (1925)

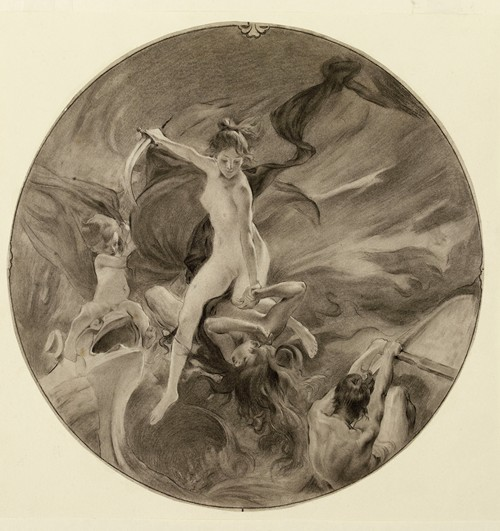
Two Fairies Fighting, after Picard

Jean-Émile Buland (25 October 1857, Paris – 15 February 1938, Paris) was a French painter, engraver, lithographer and illustrator.

== Life and work ==
He was born to Jean-Marie Buland (1825-1895), an engraver, and his wife from Luxembourg, Suzanne, née Wagener. His older brother, Jean-Eugène, was a painter.

In 1875, he enrolled at the École des Beaux-Arts, where he studied with the painter, Alexandre Cabanel, and the engraver, Louis-Pierre Henriquel-Dupont. In 1880, he won the Prix de Rome for engraving, and spent the years 1881 to 1884 studying at the villa Medici. In 1886, he married Louise Godefroy. They had one daughter.

He was awarded a silver medal at the Exposition Universelle of 1900, and a first-class medal at the Salon of 1901. Two years later, he was named a Knight in the Legion of Honor.

In 1925, he was elected to the Académie des Beaux-Arts, where he took Seat #2 for engraving, succeeding Charles Albert Waltner (deceased). At the time of his death, he was Director of the Fondation Taylor, an artists' association

Most of his engravings are after 17th and 18th-century artists, but he also reproduced works by his contemporaries, such as Antoine Calbet and Georges Picard.
