= Port Nelson dredge =

Canadian dredge

Coordinates: 57.0387°N 92.5937°W

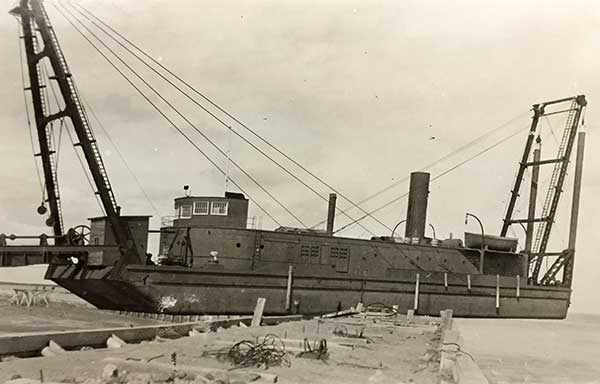
- Port Nelson aground following a storm, c. 1925

History

Canada
- Name: Port Nelson
- Operator: Department of Railways and Canals
- Ordered: 1913
- Builder: Polson Iron Works, Toronto
- Completed: March 1914
- Fate: Wrecked during a storm, November 1924

General characteristics
- Type: Suction dredger
- Tonnage: 1,200 tonnes (1,200 long tons; 1,300 short tons)
- Length: 180 feet (55 m)
- Beam: 43 feet (13 m)
- Draught: 6 feet (1.8 m)
- Crew: 35

Port Nelson was a dredger that served from 1914 to 1924 at Port Nelson, Manitoba Canada.

== History ==
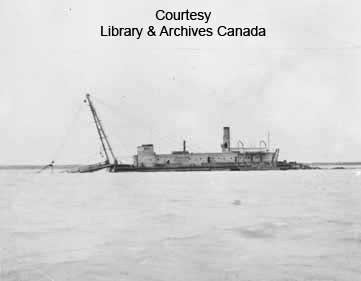
The Port Nelson at work.

In 1913 Canada's Department of Railways and Canals commissioned the Polson Ironworks, in Toronto, Ontario to build a large suction dredger to help construct what was to be the first port on North America's Arctic Ocean coast—to be named the Port Nelson. She was completed in March, 1914, and towed to Hudson's Bay, arriving in September 1914, where she promptly ran aground. A 1924 storm tossed her onto the artificial island she helped create, where her wreck remains today.

She carried a crew of 35, and was 180 feet (55 m) long, had beam of 43 feet (13 m), a draft of 6 feet (1.8 m), and displaced 1200 tonnes.

== See also ==
- Hudson Bay Railway
- Seaport of the Prairies
