= Martin Fournier (writer) =

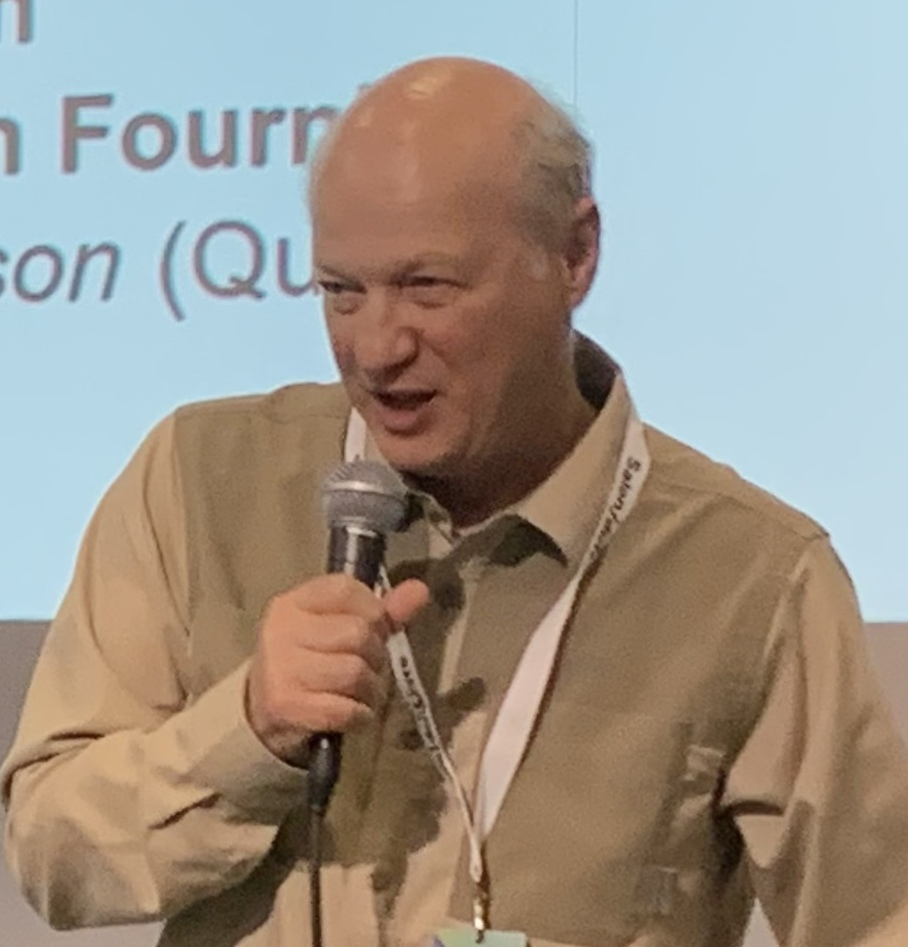
Martin Fournier in 2019

Martin Fournier (born September 10, 1954) is a Canadian historian and writer. He is most noted as the author of The Adventures of Radisson, a series of young adult historical novels centred on the adventures and explorations of 17th-century fur trader Pierre-Esprit Radisson.

L'enfer ne brûle pas, the first novel in the Radisson series, was the winner of the Governor General's Award for French-language children's literature at the 2011 Governor General's Awards. Later novels in the series included Sauver les français (2014), L'année des surhommes (2016) and Le castor ou la vie (2021). The first three novels in the series have also been translated into English by Peter McCambridge, as Hell Never Burns (2012), Back to the New World (2015) and The Incredible Escape (2016).

A former professor of history at the Université du Québec à Rimouski, he has also published an academic biography of Radisson, Pierre-Esprit Radisson 1636-1710. Aventurier et commerçant (2001), as well as Jean Mauvide, de chirurgien à seigneur de l'île d'Orléans au XVIIIe siècle (2004).
