= Grace Lee Nute =

American historian

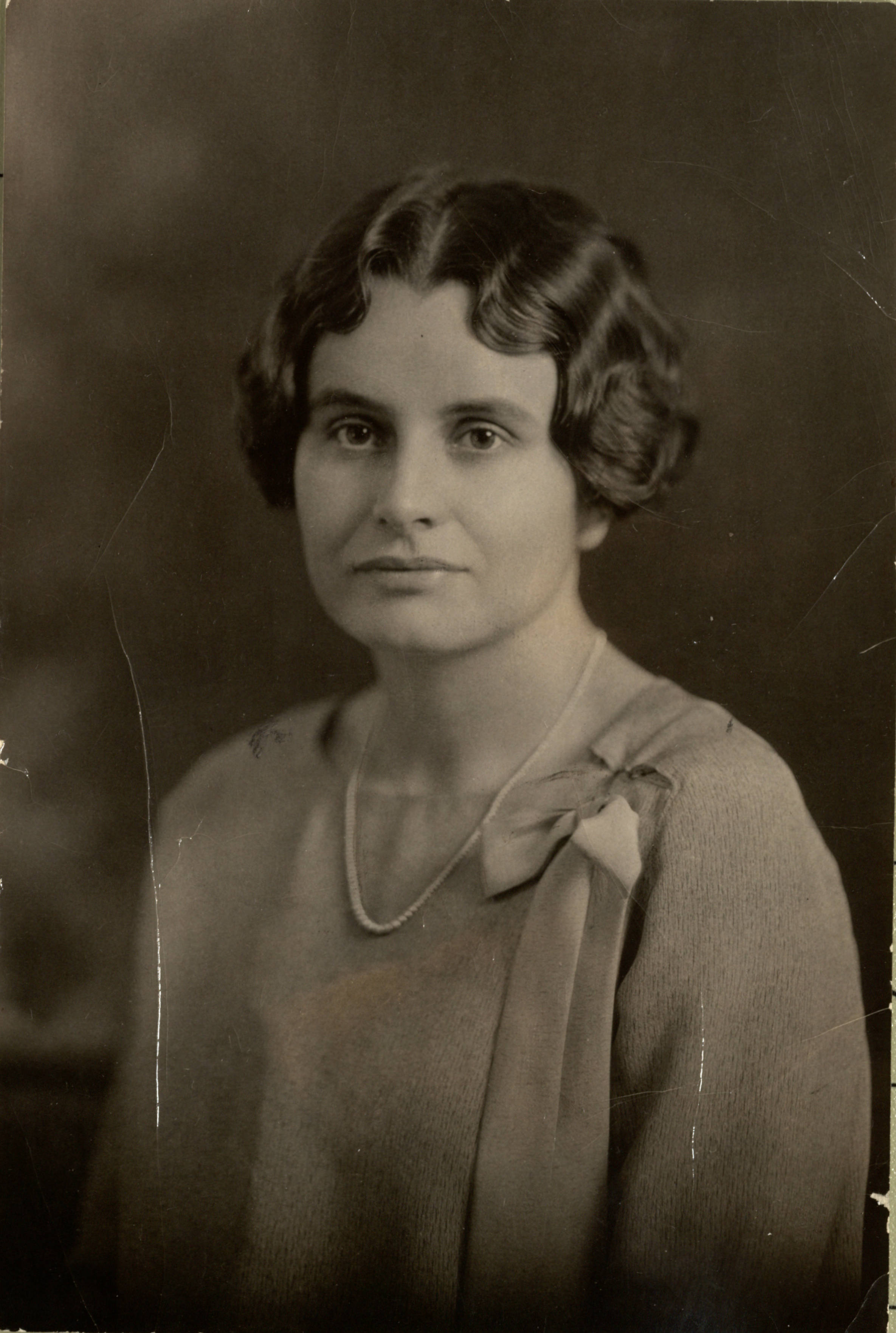
Dr. Grace Lee Nute

Grace Lee Nute (13 October 1895, in North Conway, New Hampshire – 4 May 1990, in Menlo Park, California) was a history professor and curator of manuscripts. She was among the pioneers of using microfilm to preserve information from manuscripts and increase their accessibility.

== Biography ==
Nute graduated in 1917 with an A.B. in American literature from Smith College, in 1918 with an A.M. from Radcliffe College, and in 1921 with a Ph.D. in American history from Harvard University. At the Minnesota Historical Society in St. Paul she was from 1921 to 1946 the curator of manuscripts and from 1946 to 1957 a research associate. In 1927 she became an assistant professor at Hamline University in St. Paul.

She taught Minnesota history at Hamline University from 1927-60, conducted study courses for business women from 1930-34, was a lecturer on Minnesota history for the University of Minnesota Extension Division from 1948-52, was a visiting professor at Macalester College from 1956-59, and the director of the James J. Hill papers project for the Hill Reference Library in St. Paul from 1960-66.

Nute wrote books and articles on the North American fur trade and the French exploration of Minnesota. For the academic year 1934–1935 she was awarded a Guggenheim Fellowship for the purpose of writing of a joint biography of the French explorers Médard Chouart and Pierre-Esprit Radisson. She wrote articles for the Mississippi Valley Historical Review, the American Historical Review, and the Dictionary of American Biography, as well as several journals that are mainly of interest to residents of the state of Minnesota.

== Selected publications ==
- Nute, Grace Lee (1925). The Red River Trails.
- —— (1931). The Voyageur. D. Appleton & Company.
  - —— (2008-10-14). The Voyageur. Minnesota Historical Society Press. ISBN 9780873517065.
- —— (1941). The Voyageur's Highway: Minnesota's Border Lake Land. Minnesota Historical Society. ISBN 9780873510066.
  - —— (2009-10-07). The Voyageur's Highway: Minnesota's Border Lake Land. Minnesota Historical Society Press. ISBN 9780873517560.
- —— (1943). Caesars of the Wilderness: Médard Chouart, Sieur des Groseilliers, and Pierre Esprit Radisson, 1618-1710.
  - —— (1978). Caesars of the Wilderness: Médard Chouart, Sieur des Groseilliers and Pierre Esprit Radisson, 1618-1710. Minnesota Historical Society Press. ISBN 9780873511285.
- —— (1944). Lake Superior.
  - —— (2000). Lake Superior. University of Minnesota Press. ISBN 9780816635818.
- —— (1945). Calendar of the American Fur Company's Papers.
- —— (1950). Rainy River country: A brief history of the region bordering Minnesota and Ontario.
  - —— (2004). Rainy River Country: A Brief History of the Region Bordering Minnesota and Ontario. Minnesota Historical Society Press. ISBN 9780873510080.
- —— (1958). A History of the Arts in Minnesota. University of Minnesota Press. ISBN 9780816667215.
