= Charles Noble (politician) =

American politician

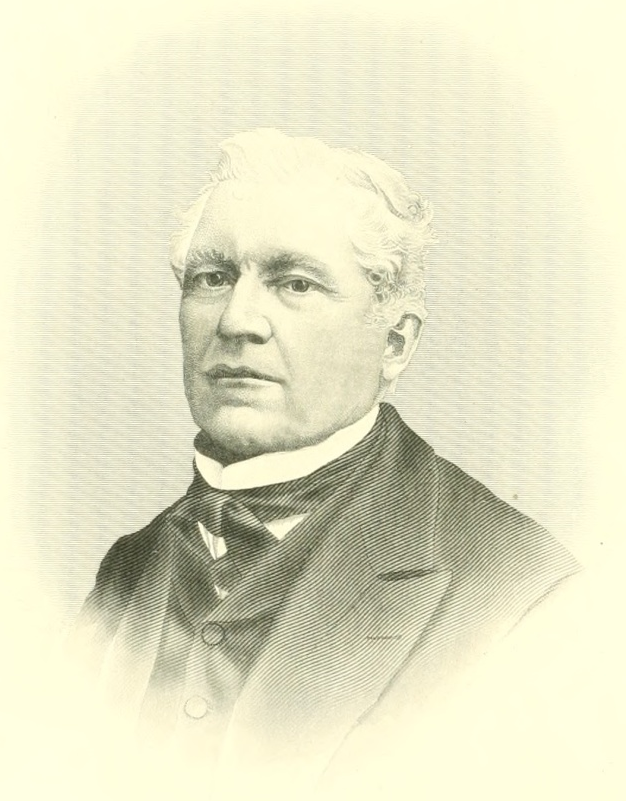

Member of the Michigan House of Representatives from the Wayne County 3rd district
- In office January 1, 1855 – 1856

Personal details
- Born: July 4, 1797 Williamstown, Massachusetts, US
- Died: December 26, 1874 (aged 77)
- Party: Whig (c. 1833-1856); Independent (c. 1856-1874)
- Education: Williams College

Charles Noble (July 4, 1797 – December 26, 1874) was a Michigan politician.

== Early life ==
Charles Noble was born on July 4, 1797, in Williamstown, Massachusetts to parents Deodatus and Betsey Noble. He graduated from Williams College in 1815, and was admitted to the bar in 1818.

== Career ==
Later in 1818, Noble first went to Cleveland, Ohio for a spell, but then moved to Monroe, Michigan where he started practicing law, and continued to do so until 1867. Noble was a member of the Michigan Territorial Council from Monroe County from 1828 to 1829. On November 8, 1854, Noble was elected to the Michigan House of Representatives where he represented the Wayne County 3rd district from January 3, 1855 to 1856. Noble was a member of the Whig Party while the party existed. After it dissolved, Noble became an independent. In 1867, Noble moved to Detroit where he got into the business of buying and selling pine lands until his death.

== Personal life ==
Noble married Eliza Sims Wing on May 16, 1823.

== Death ==
Noble died on December 26, 1874. Noble was interred at Woodland Cemetery in Monroe.
