= Charles Albert Noble =

American mathematician (1867–1962)

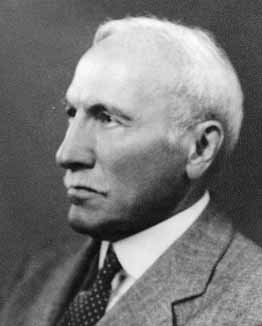
- Born: August 14, 1867; Soquel, California
- Died: May 7, 1962 (aged 94); Berkeley, California
- Education: University of California at Berkeley; University of Göttingen
- Scientific career
- Fields: Mathematics
- Workplaces: University of California at Berkeley
- Thesis: Eine neue Methode in der Variationsrechnung (1901)
- Doctoral advisor: David Hilbert

Charles Albert Noble (1867–1962) was an American mathematician, professor at the University of California, Berkeley.

== Life and work ==
Noble was a son of a farmer from the county of Santa Cruz, South of San Francisco Bay, but since he did not like agricultural work, he went to live with an older sister to San Francisco where he completed his secondary education. He enrolled at the University of California at Berkeley where he graduated in sciences in 1889. He then became a professor of mathematics at the Oakland High School. In 1893, wanting to obtain a doctorate in mathematics, he went to Europe to study at the Göttingen University with Felix Klein and David Hilbert. In 1896, he returned to San Francisco and he was appointed professor of mathematics at the University of California at Berkeley. In 1901, he defended his doctoral thesis at Göttingen, under the direction of Hilbert.

Noble was a fellow in mathematics, instructor, assistant professor, associate professor, professor, from 1896 to 1937, at Berkeley until his retirement in 1937. During the period 1933–34 he was the chairman of the mathematics department of the university and professor emeritus, 1937–1962.

Along with Earle Raymond Hedrick, another American doctorate in Göttingen, Noble published a translation into English of the book by Klein Elementary Mathematics from an advanced standpoint, in two volumes (1932 and 1939), that had a significant influence on the development of the American mathematical community.

Noble was also very interested in mathematics pedagogy and in 1926 he made a trip to Germany to investigate the teaching system of mathematics in schools. His work was published in 1927 in the journal of the Mathematical Association of America, The American Mathematical Monthly. He had been, in 1901, one of the founders of the San Francisco section of this association.

== Bibliography ==
- Schubring, Gert (2016). "Preface to 2016 Edition" (PDF). In Felix Klein (ed.). Elementary Mathematics from a Higher Standpoint. Volume I: Arithmetic, Algebra, Analysis. Springer. pp. i–xx. ISBN 978-3-662-49440-0.
- Noble, Charles A. (1927). "The Teaching of Mathematics in German Secondary Schools and the Training of Teachers for These Schools". The American Mathematical Monthly. 34 (6): 286–293. doi:10.1080/00029890.1927.11986705. ISSN 0002-9890.
- Parshall, Karen Hunger; Rowe, David E. (1994). The Emergence of the American Mathematical Research Community. American Mathematical Society. ISBN 0-8218-9004-2.
- Weiss, Isette (2019). "Introducing History of Mathematics Education Through its Actors: Peter Treutlein's Intuitive Geometry". In Hans-Georg Weigand; William McCallum; Marta Menghini; Michael Neubrand; Gert Schubring (eds.). The Legacy of Felix Klein. Springer. pp. 107–116. ISBN 978-3-319-99385-0.
- Wilczynski, E.J. (1902). "The first meeting of the San Francisco Section of the American Mathematical Society" (PDF). Bulletin of the American Mathematical Society. 8 (10): 429–437. doi:10.1090/S0002-9904-1902-00920-8. ISSN 0273-0979.
