= Charles Noble (cricketer) =

English cricketer

Charles Noble (9 February 1850 – 8 March 1927) was an English first-class cricketer active 1867–68 who played for Surrey. He was born in Kennington; died in Trowbridge.
