= Pierre-Esprit Radisson =

French fur trader and explorer (d. 1710)

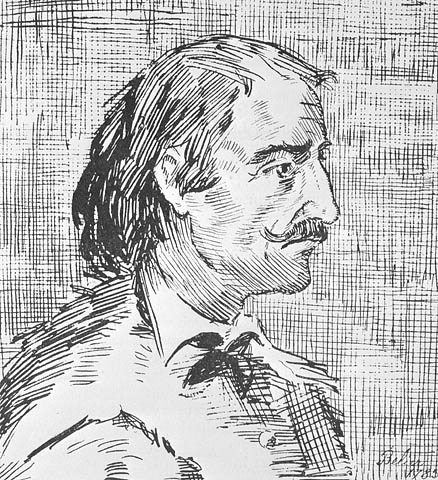
- Born: 1636–1640; Possibly Avignon or Paris, France
- Died: 1710 (aged 69–74); London, England
- Occupations: Explorer, fur trader, co-founder of Hudson's Bay Company

Pierre-Esprit Radisson (1636/40 – 1710) was a French coureur des bois and explorer in New France. He is often linked to his brother-in-law Médard des Groseilliers. The decision of Radisson and Groseilliers to enter the English service led to the formation of the Hudson's Bay Company. His career was particularly notable for its repeated transitions between serving Britain and France.

There is no image of him other than that provided in his writings and those of the people who encountered him in New France, in Paris on the fringes of the court, on remote Hudson Bay, and in late Stuart London. Radisson should be considered in multiple contexts; for his achievement as a narrator of his own life, the range of his explorations, his experiences among the Indigenous peoples, and his social formation, both as a man of the early modern period for whom personal honour was an important value and as a working trader participating in the mercantile projects of the era. Radisson's life and writings have been interpreted from many different perspectives. Many French Canadians until the twentieth century accepted the verdict of his French contemporaries that he was a traitor to France.

== Early life ==
=== Birth and emigration to New France ===
Pierre-Esprit Radisson's birthplace is unclear, but was likely in France's lower Rhône region near the town Avignon. In a 1697 affidavit and a 1698 petition he reported his age as 61 and 62, respectively, suggesting birth in 1636. Yet a 1681 census in New France, Canada, reported his age as 41, suggesting birth in 1640. This coheres with baptismal records from Carpentras, a city near Avignon, that concern Radisson's father, Pierre-Esprit Radisson Sr.

Radisson would trace his family, the Hayet-Radissons, to the town St. Malo, whereas records suggest either Paris or Avignon. According to Radisson, he emigrated from France to Canada on 24 May 1651. He may have arrived with his two sisters, Élisabeth and Françoise. They may also have been accompanied by their maternal half-sister Marguerite Hayet, who would eventually marry Radisson's later fur-trading partner, Médard Chouart des Groseilliers. By sometime in 1651, these three women were living together in Trois-Rivières.

=== Capture, adoption, and torture by Mohawk ===
In 1651 or 1652, while hunting fowl near his Trois-Rivières home, Radisson became separated from his hunting group. After discovering its several men killed by a Mohawk raiding party, he was captured by the warriors. Perhaps because of his youth, he received fairly mild treatment and, as he showed interest in Mohawk language and culture, was adopted and assimilated. In the Mohawk custom of adopting young captives, whether indigenous or European, to replace relatives lost to disease or warfare, Radisson joined a local Mohawk family near modern-day Schenectady in New York.

Not long after Radisson's integration, which took about six weeks, while out hunting with three Mohawk, he met an Algonquin man who convinced him to defect and return to Trois-Rivières. Together, they killed Radisson's Mohawk companions, traveled 14 days, and sighted the town, but were captured by patrolling Mohawk. The Mohawk killed the Algonquin and subjected Radisson, along with some 20 prisoners, to ritual torture. His adoptive, Mohawk family advocated for him and materially compensated the bereaved families to spare him execution and temper his torture.

As the Iroquois despised cowardice and punished it with death, Radisson's adoptive parents advised him to be brave and yet not too brave, since the Iroquois also sometimes ate the hearts of exceptionally brave men to acquire their courage. Radisson's fingernails were pulled out while he was forced to sing, one finger was cut to the bone, and he watched ten Huron Indians get tortured to death. The next day, an old man burned Radisson, tied to a scaffold, and a young man drove a red-hot dagger through his foot. After three days of similar treatment, the Mohawk brought out Huron prisoners and, using tomahawks, bashed in the heads of some, whereas the rest were adopted by individual families.

Once eventually released, the overwhelmed Radisson found that, as he would recall, "all my pains and griefs ceased, not feeling the least pain. [My father] bids me be merry, makes me sing, to which I consented with all my heart." He felt deep gratitude to his adoptive parents, whom he described as very loving, for saving his life. By Iroquois standards, Radisson's torture had been moderate. Radisson recounts witnessing other torture: "They burned a Frenchwoman; they pulled out her breasts, and took a child out of her belly, with they broyled [broiled] and made the mother eat it, so in short she died". Sometime after his own wounds healed, Radisson spent some five months on a war-party expedition.

=== Departure from Iroquois and missionary work ===
With other Mohawk warriors, Radisson traveled to a trading post at Fort Orange, then controlled by the Dutch, located in present-day Albany, New York. There, a governor recognized him as a Frenchman and offered to pay for his freedom. But Radisson returned to his Mohawk village. He escaped on 29 October 1653, "at 8 of the clock in the morning". Reaching Fort Orange, he was hidden at a farm, then met a Jesuit priest Joseph Antoine Poncet, who made him "a great offer", whereby he returned to Holland in early 1654 under an agreement now unclear but perhaps involving missionary work.

Later that year, 1654, Radisson returned to Trois-Rivières in New France. Over the next three years, he would embark on several missionary expeditions. His writings largely ignored this period, so little is known about his whereabouts during it, apart from a documented a deed of sale that he signed in November 1655. In 1657, Radisson accompanied a joint Franco–Iroquois expedition into Onondaga territory to aid a Jesuit priest named Simon Le Moyne operate his mission and to promote further fur trading. In 1658, under rising tensions with local Iroquois, the French left, ending the expedition. Radisson soon returned to Québec.

== Career ==
Radisson's biggest influence in Canadian history dates from the period of 1658 to 1684, when he was an active coureur-des-bois, fur trader, and explorer. In August 1659, Radisson persuaded his brother-in-law, Médard Chouart des Groseilliers, to hire him for his journey around Lake Superior. The year-long trip was planned to collect furs, in order to participate in the ever-lucrative fur trade.

In the winter of 1659–1660, Radisson and Des Groseilliers lived just south of Lake Superior in what is now Wisconsin, associating with groups of Huron, Ottawa, Ojibwa and Sioux (Dakota) Indians. When Radisson arrived at an Ojibwa village on the shores of Lake Superior, where he spent much of the winter, he later reported giving three types of presents: to the men, women and children of the village. He gave each of the men "...a kettle, two hatchets [tomahawks], and six knives and a blade for a sword"; the women "...2 and 20 awls, 50 needles, 2 graters [scrapers] of castors, 2 ivory combs and 2 wooden ones, with red painte [vermilion], 6 looking-glasses of tin"; and to the children "...brasse rings, of small bells, and rasades [beads] of divers colors...". American historian Bruce White wrote that Radission and Des Groseilliers did not entirely understand Ojibwa society, as the kettles were typically used much more by the women for cooking than by the men. Giving paint and make-up only to women overlooked the fact that Ojibwa men used make-up and painted their faces just as much as Ojibwa women did. But Radisson may have learned that kettles were used prominently by the Huron in their Feast of the Dead, and thought that the Ojibwa men might use them in their own version of that feast.

On the other hand, White notes that the two Frenchmen clearly understood some aspects of Ojibwa gender roles very well: the gift of tomahawks for the men acknowledged that Ojibwa men were hunters and warriors, while the gift of awls for the women reflected that Ojibwa women gathered rice, gardened, cooked, fished, built bark houses, and wove mats. Ojibwa women also played important roles in the fur trade. Some married winter partners or traders, establishing relations that gave advantages to their bands. Others used their sexuality as a way of establishing informal relations with the French in order to ensure the continued supply of European goods and prevent the French from trading with other Indians.

Radisson reported on visiting one Ojibwa village in the spring of 1660, where there was a welcoming ceremony: "The women throw themselves backward on the ground, thinking to give us tokens of friendship and wellcome [welcome]". Radisson was confused at first by what the action meant, but as the women started to engage in more overtly sexual behavior, he quickly realized what they were offering. Several tribal elders informed Radisson that they did not want him trading with their enemies, the Dakota [Sioux], and that he and Des Groseilliers were free to sleep with the unmarried women of the village on condition that they did not trade with the Dakota. As Radisson's account was written for an English audience, he was vague as to whether he and Des Groseilliers took up this offer.

When Radisson and Groseilliers returned to Québec on August 24, 1660, with many furs, the merchants waiting for them were delighted to be able to sail with the pelts to Europe, but the Governor was jealous of their success. In 1659 Groseilliers had met with Governor Pierre de Voyer d'Argenson to gain a year-long permit to explore New France; the governor granted it. Seeing the success of the trip and the number of furs they had brought back, d'Argenson levied high taxes on the men, ostensibly because they had exceeded the terms of their year-long permit by a couple of days.

After seeking unsuccessfully in the courts to regain what had been confiscated by the Governor, Radisson and Groseilliers decided to go to Boston in the English Thirteen Colonies for their next explorations. They would seek English financing there to support their expedition.

=== Trade and journeys to Hudson Bay ===
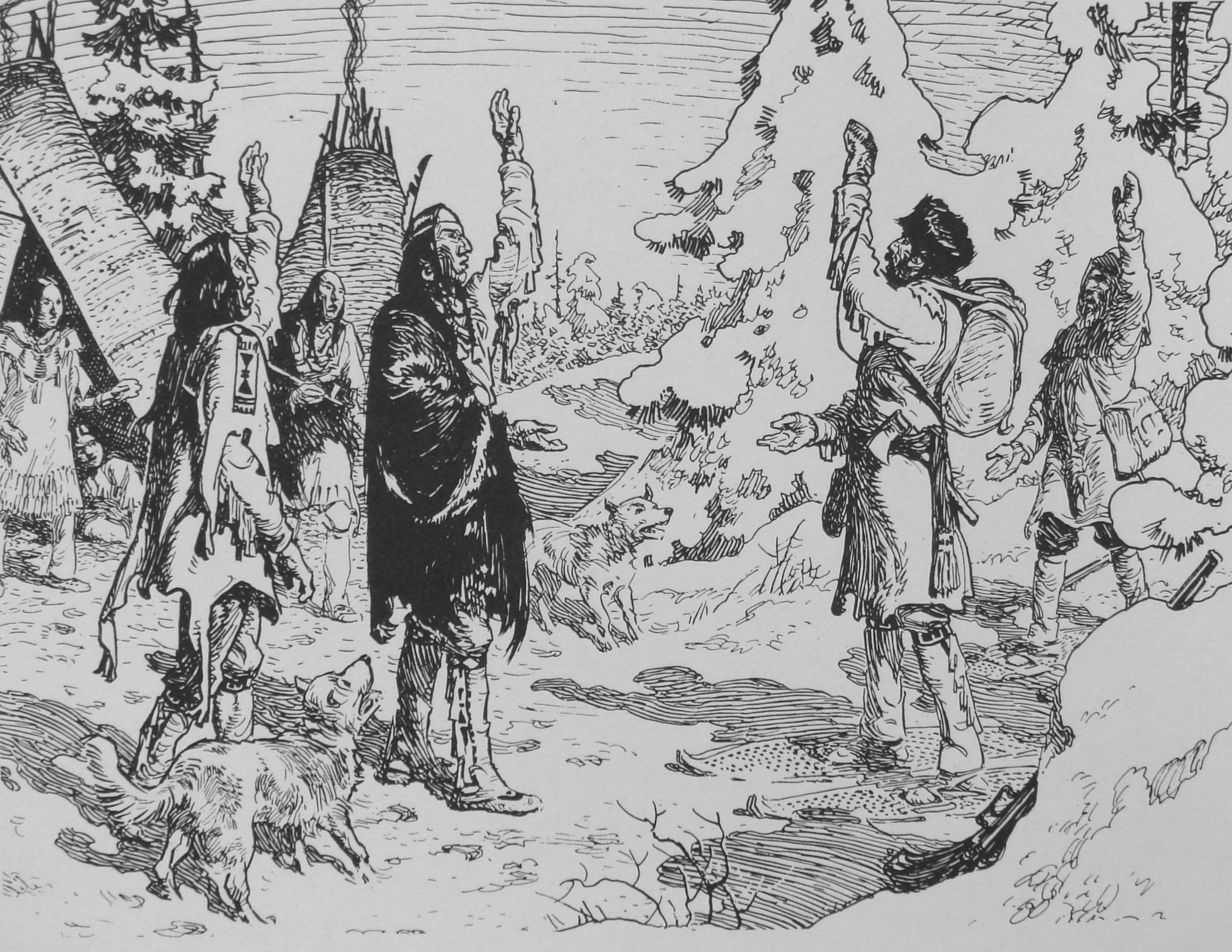
Arrival of Radisson in an Indian camp in 1660.

Throughout their 1659–1660 voyage, the French explorers had heard references to a "salt sea" as an area with an abundance of good furs. They determined the reference must be to Hudson Bay and began to seek financing and sea-going ships for their new explorations. They could reach this destination by travel on waters outside the continent, instead of through a number of internal rivers. The first voyage to Hudson Bay was unsuccessful since the winter of that year came early, and they judged their rations on board insufficient to survive it. The pair were forced to return to Boston but were promised two ships and crew for a second attempt the following year.

This second attempt was cancelled after one of the ships was destroyed in a storm. The two men were invited to England to meet King Charles II in 1665. There they passed the winter. In the spring, they left for the New World with ship's crew that the king had promised them. The vessel Eaglet, which was carrying Radisson to Hudson's Bay, nearly sank in an Atlantic storm and was forced to turn back to Plymouth, England. In September 1668, Nonsuch landed in the Rupert River region on the shores of James Bay, where Des Groseilliers used his knowledge of frontier living to build dwellings for the crew for wintering over. About 300 Cree Indians came up in the spring of 1669 to trade furs in exchange for European goods.

Radisson sought the support of a royal patron to secure a crown monopoly on trade within the Hudson's Bay region. Prince Rupert of the Rhine, the king's first cousin and a war hero on the royalist side during the English Civil War, became that patron. Prince Rupert was not considered to be a good businessman and was not one of the king's closest friends, but he was the only member of the royal family prepared to champion the Radisson–Des Groseilliers project of fur trading at Hudson's Bay, and critical to their getting a royal charter from Charles II. While soliciting financing from the City of London, Radisson and des Groseilliers had the advantages of being the only men who knew how to survive in the North, and who also knew the local languages and customs of the Indians, and the geography.

=== Foundation of the Hudson's Bay Company ===
In 1670, Radisson was back in England and on 2 May received a royal charter giving him and his partners the exclusive rights to the land surrounding Hudson Bay; with this they founded the Hudson's Bay Company (HBC). During the next few years, they made a number of highly profitable trips between England and the Bay region. With the founding of the HBC, Radisson became forced to deal with a European context; there he had to struggle for survival among rival monarchs, competing courtiers, and the changing political and economic world in which they operated.

King Charles II in his charter for the Hudson's Bay Company also founded a proprietary colony named Rupert's Land, declaring that the lands adjacent to Hudson's Bay or rivers flowing into Hudson's Bay now belonged to the Hudson's Bay Company. In theory, much of modern Canada then belonged to the Hudson's Bay Company, as Rupert's Land was a vast region. In practice, the company maintained a few trading forts on the sea coasts of northern Ontario and northern Québec, to which they later added forts on the sea coast of northern Manitoba. It was not until the late 18th century that the Hudson's Bay Company showed any interest in moving inland and making good its claims to control Rupert's Land.

Both Radisson and Groseilliers operated within the HBC with the support of Prince Rupert and the company's director Sir John Robinson. Radisson and Groseilliers were successful in having the HBC receive much capital from the City of London in order to fund its operations. In 1672, Radisson married Mary Kirke, the daughter of Sir John Kirke, one of the City investors in the HBC.

As anti-French and anti-Catholic sentiment increased in England following discontent expressed in events such as the Bawdy House Riots of 1668, both Prince Rupert and Sir John decreased their support for the men. Although Radisson's reasons for doing so are not fully clear, he left London in 1675 with Grosseiliers to reenter the service of France, leaving his wife behind in England.

=== In French service ===
After leaving Britain, Radisson was unpopular in the royal court. In 1677 he decided to join the navy and to fund Marshal of France, Jean II d'Estrées's expedition in the Franco-Dutch War to conquer the island of Tobago, winning the man's favor. Following his involvement in the war, he borrowed 100 Louis d'or from the Marshal in a failed attempt to pay to arrange his wife's passage from Britain. He also failed to regain a position in the Hudson's Bay Company, as a further result of anti-French prejudice.

In 1681 Radisson headed out to found a fort on the Nelson River under a French flag, albeit against the wishes of the French state. He did so as a means of capturing the market, fearing the construction of a British fort on the same river and thus further dominance of the bay by the Hudson's Bay Company. He recruited Grosseilliers the following year to build a more permanent base.

In the winter of 1683 he and Groseilliers went to France to deal with their legal problems. (They had seized two English parties in time of peace and paid Québec tax on furs from Hudson Bay from their Nelson River fort, which may not have been part of New France.) Here they found themselves pawns in the events that led up to the Glorious Revolution. The English ambassador, Lord Preston, asked that they be punished. Compromise plans were made to send Radisson back to the Bay to pick up the remaining furs and divide the profits fairly. Lord Preston recruited Radisson back into the English service and Groseilliers returned to Québec.

=== Working for the Hudson's Bay Company ===
In 1684 Radisson sailed for the Hayes River in the vessel Happy Return, where he found Groseilliers' son Jean-Baptiste conducting a brisk trade with the Indians. He recruited Jean-Baptiste into joining HBC service and left for England in September, leaving John Abraham in charge of the fort. (Eight days later two ships belonging to Charles Aubert de La Chesnaye arrived from Québec. Although there was conflict, no blood was shed. The French wintered near the English and returned to Québec with a moderate load of furs.) Radisson's differences with various Hudson's Bay Company underlings in the 1680s suggests that he was not admired by the English seamen who had to work with him, because of their rooted detestation of the French.

In 1685 Radisson was made "Superintendent and Chief Director of the Trade at Port Nelson", where he seems to have accomplished little. In 1687 he made serious charges against the superintendent of York Factory. The HBC rejected the charges and Radisson was removed. Thereafter he lived in England on an HBC pension, which was irregularly paid. He died in 1710. In 1729 the company voted to pay ten pounds to his third wife, "she being ill and in great want."

== Legacy and honors ==
On October 3 1989, the Canadian Armed Forces named HMCS Radisson after him.

The towns of Radisson, Quebec; Radisson, Saskatchewan and Radisson, Wisconsin; a street and Metro station in Montreal; and the Radisson provincial electoral district in Manitoba, are all named after him.

The Radisson Hotels group, starting with the Radisson Hotel in Minneapolis in 1909, is also named after him.

The Canadian Coast Guard named CCGS Pierre Radisson after him.

== Representation in other media ==
American writer Sinclair Lewis wrote several novels about Grand Republic, the seat of the fictitious Radisson County, Minnesota.

Sterling North dramatized Radisson's life and adventures in his young adult novel Captured by the Mohawks.

Radisson was portrayed by Paul Muni in the 1941 film Hudson's Bay.

The CBC Television series Radisson (1957–1958) was based on the explorer's life. Jacques Godin played the character of Radisson.

Historian Martin Fournier has written both an academic biography of Radisson, Pierre-Esprit Radisson 1636-1710. Aventurier et commerçant (2001), and a series of historical young adult novels, The Adventures of Radisson.

== See also ==
- Coureur des bois
- Timeline of Quebec history (1663 to 1759)
- Pierre Allemand
- Voyageurs

== Sources ==
- DeVoto, Bernard (1998) [1952]. The Course of Empire. Houghton Mifflin Harcourt. p. 99. ISBN 0-395-92498-7.
- Flanagan, John T. (March 1960). "The Minnesota Backgrounds of Sinclair Lewis' Fiction" (PDF). Minnesota History Magazine. 37 (1).
- Fournier, Martin (2002). Pierre-Esprit Radisson: Merchant Adventurer, 1636-1701. McGill–Queens University Press. ISBN 978-0-7735-7428-1.
- Friesen, Gerald (1987). The Canadian Prairies: A History. University of Toronto Press. ISBN 978-0-8020-6648-0.
- Mood, Fulmer; Turner, Frederick J. (March 1950). "Radisson and Groseilliers: A Newly Recovered Historical Essay by Frederick J. Turner". Wisconsin Magazine of History. 33 (3): 318–326. JSTOR 4632146.
- Newman, Peter C. (1985). Company of Adventurers. Viking. ISBN 978-0-670-80877-9.
- Newman, Peter C. (1998). Empire of the Bay: The Company of Adventurers that Seized a Continent. Penguin. ISBN 978-0-14-027488-2.
- Nute, Grace Lee (1978). Caesars of the Wilderness: Médard Chouart, Sieur Des Groseilliers and Pierre Esprit Radisson, 1618-1710. Minnesota Historical Society Press. ISBN 978-0-87351-128-5.
- Nute, Grace Lee (1979) [1969]. "Radisson, Pierre-Esprit". In Hayne, David (ed.). Dictionary of Canadian Biography. Vol. II (1701–1740) (online ed.). University of Toronto Press.
- Radisson, Pierre Esprit; Scull, Gideon Delaplaine (1885). Voyages of Peter Esprit Radisson: Being an Account of His Travels and Experiences Among the North American Indians, from 1652 to 1684. Boston: The Prince Society. – Also Voyages Of Peter Esprit Radisson at Project Gutenberg and Voyages Of Peter Esprit Radisson at the Internet Archive
- Ray, Arthur J. (1996). The Cambridge History of the Native Peoples of the Americas. Vol. 2. Cambridge University Press. p. 280. ISBN 978-0-5215-7393-1.
- Warkentin, Germaine, ed. (2012). Pierre-Esprit Radisson: The Collected Writings, Volume 1: The Voyages. McGill-Queen's University Press. ISBN 978-0-7735-4082-8. JSTOR j.ctt1pq1h7.
- Warkentin, Germaine, ed. (2014). Pierre-Esprit Radisson, The Collected Writings, Volume 2: The Port Nelson Relations, Miscellaneous Writings, and Related Documents. The Publications of the Champlain Society. doi:10.3138/9781487510091. ISBN 978-0-7735-4438-3.
- White, Bruce W. (Winter 1999). "The Woman Who Married a Beaver: Trade Patterns and Gender Roles in the Ojibwa Fur Trade" (PDF). Ethnohistory. 46 (1): 109–147. JSTOR 483430. Archived from the original (PDF) on 25 October 2019.
