= Charly-sur-Marne =

- Commune
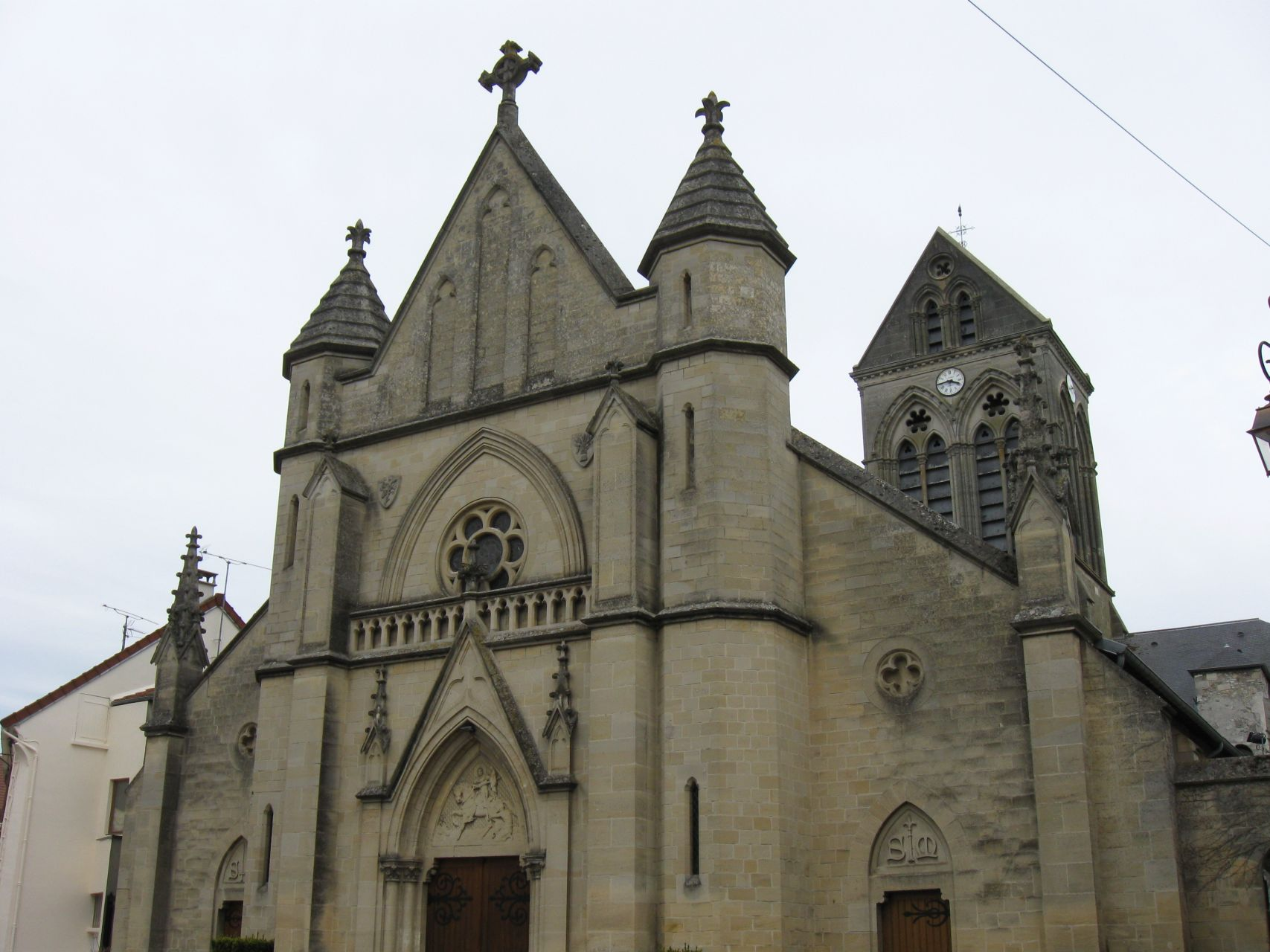
- The church of Charly-sur-Marne

- Coat of arms
- Location of Charly-sur-Marne
- Location within France Location within Hauts-de-France
- Coordinates: 48°58′41″N 3°17′10″E
- Country: France
- Region: Hauts-de-France
- Department: Aisne
- Arrondissement: Château-Thierry
- Canton: Essômes-sur-Marne
- Intercommunality: Charly sur Marne

Government
  - Mayor (2026–32): Martine Arnoulet
- Area^{1}: 20.52 km^{2} (7.92 sq mi)
- Elevation: 63 m (207 ft)
- Highest elevation: 211 m (692 ft)
- Lowest elevation: 57 m (187 ft)
- Population (2023): 2,594
  - Density: 126.4/km^{2} (327.4/sq mi)
- Time zone: UTC+01:00 (CET)
  - Summer (DST): UTC+02:00 (CEST)
- INSEE/Postal code: 02163 /02310
- ^{1} French Land Register data, which excludes lakes, ponds, glaciers > 1 km^{2} (0.386 sq mi or 247 acres) and river estuaries.

Charly-sur-Marne (French pronunciation: [ʃaʁli syʁ maʁn], literally Charly on Marne) is a commune in the Aisne department in Hauts-de-France in northern France.

An old fortified city dating from the 9th-century Burgundy, it was renamed from Charly in 2006.

== Geography ==
The old city lies to the north of the Marne. The river has moved south through accretion since the town was originally built. Across the river are the villages of Nogent-l'Artaud and Pavant. The town of Charly is halfway between La Ferté-sous-Jouarre and Château-Thierry, and halfway between Paris and Rheims.

== Neighborhoods ==
- "The H"(also called the City of 40 crazy)
- Le Petit Val Clos des Buttes
- The Four Corners (downtown)
- The industrial zone (includes Garnier stage, the college and the Skate Park and various factories and shops)
- The Ruvet

== History ==
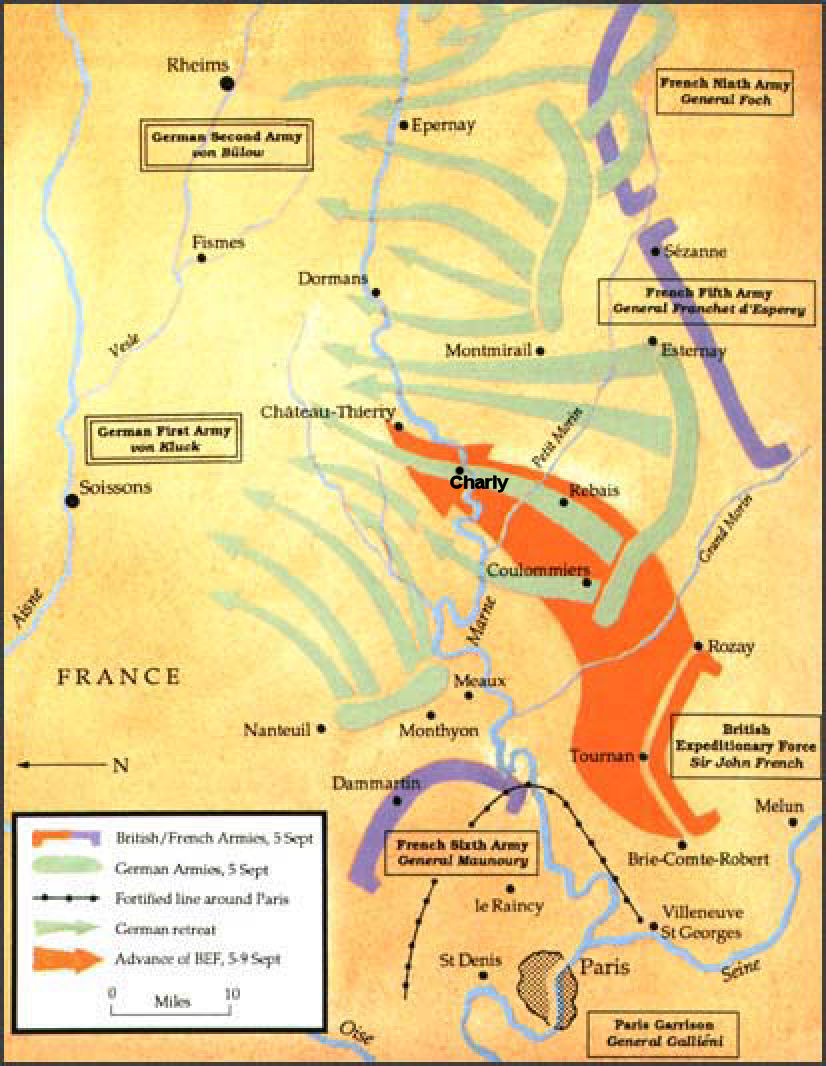
Map showing British advance at the First Battle of the Marne, 1914

There is archaeological evidence of a Roman town on the site. The name of the town is a shortened form of Charles, believed to have been so named because Charles Martel had one of his palaces here. In 858 Charles the Bald, granted rights to establish the female abbey of Notre-Dame de Soissons, which included extensive seigniory lands in Charly, which dedicated lands lasted until the French Revolution. Before 1789, Charly did not have a local government. It was managed by the provost, then baillif, of the abbess of Notre-Dame de Soissons. After the revolution, in 1792, the former vicar of Charly became mayor.

In 1652, the troops of Cardinal Mazarin were defeated by the Huguenots outside the walls of Charly.

Louis Emile Morlot (*1859, 1907), was the mayor of Charly, a French Deputy, and the leader in the legal battle to keep the name Champagne restricted to the sparking wine produced from the vineyards located between Crouttes-sur-Marne and Trélou. This protection was ensured by the Treaty of Madrid (1891).

In the First World War, the German First Army under von Kluck had occupied Charly, when in the First Battle of the Marne, the British Expeditionary Force (BEF) counter-attack crossed the Marne at Charly.

== Population ==
Historical population
Year	Pop.	±% p.a.
1968	1,974	—
1975	2,055	+0.58%
1982	2,395	+2.21%
1990	2,475	+0.41%
1999	2,727	+1.08%
2007	2,703	−0.11%
2012	2,677	−0.19%
2017	2,617	−0.45%
2023	2,594	−0.15%
Source: INSEE

== Economy ==
Charly has extensive vineyards (950 ha.) of Chardonnay and in particular Pinot Meunier (or just Meunier) grapes used in the production of Champagne (appellation controlled).

== Sights ==
- The Convent of the Cordeliers with its many towers.
- St. Martin's Church
- The Tomb of Commandant Cornette (a General of Napoleon)

== See also ==
- Communes of the Aisne department
