= Charlie Noble (chimney) =

Smoke stack on a ship's galley

Charlie Noble is the smoke stack on a ship's galley.

Around 1850, a British merchant service captain, Charles Noble, upon discovering that the stack of his ship's galley was made of copper, ordered that it be kept bright. From then onwards the ship's crew then started referring to the galley smokestack as the "Charlie Noble".

== See also ==
- Glossary of nautical terms (disambiguation)
- Dorade box
