= Charles Bayly (governor) =

Charles Bayly (fl. c. 1630–1680) was the first overseas governor of the Hudson's Bay Company. He likely spent his early years in the court of Queen Henrietta Maria, the wife of Charles I, and was an English born French Roman Catholic in this Protestant court, implying that his father was part of the Queen's staff.

Bayly was sent to France at age 12 or 13 and some time later was returning to London, was brought on board a ship headed for America and spent 14 years as a bond-servant. He appears in Quaker records as a member and living in Anne Arundel County, Maryland in 1657. He returned to England in 1660 and there followed years of travel and imprisonment for various actions as a Quaker.

In 1670, for reasons undetermined, Bayly was released from prison and made the first overseas governor of the Hudson's Bay Company and in June sailed for Fort Nelson at the mouth of the Nelson River. This was the first headquarters of the Hudson's Bay Company in North America.

Bayly spent 1670 and 1671, until they sailed home, exploring and trading, mostly from the HBC location at Rupert River which had been established in 1668 by an expedition of Médard des Groseilliers. In subsequent years he established the first post at Moose Factory (in 1673) and explored and developed trade.

In 1679 Bayly was recalled under charges of mismanagement; probably related to poor management rather than dishonesty. His career at the HBC, despite the charges, was successful. Although he neglected book-keeping detail, his activities in James Bay were important to the Company's first ten years of its existence. He died while the charges were being prepared.
