= Nonsuch (1650 ship) =

British merchant ship

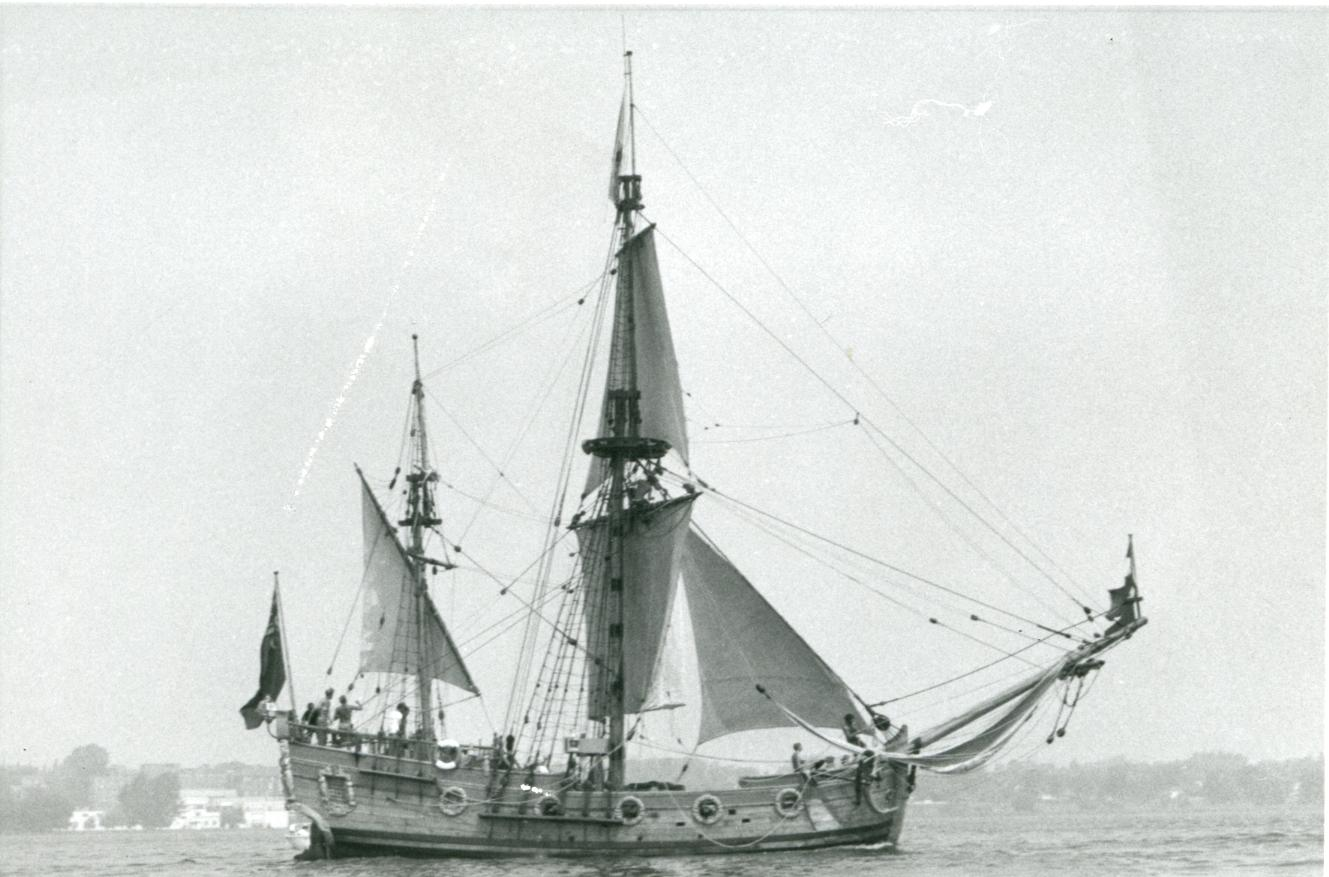
- HBC Nonsuch replica

History

England
- Name: Nonsuch
- Launched: 1650; 1970 (replica)

General characteristics
- Length: 54 feet (16 m)
- Draught: 6 feet (1.8 m)

Nonsuch was the ketch that sailed into Hudson Bay in 1668-1669 under Zachariah Gillam, in the first trading voyage for what was to become the Hudson's Bay Company two years later. Originally built as a merchant ship in 1650, and later the Royal Navy ketch HMS Nonsuch, the vessel was sold to Sir William Warren in 1667. The name means "none such", i.e. "unequalled". The ship was at the time considered smaller than many others but was specifically selected because of her small size so that when she arrived in Hudson Bay and James Bay she could be sailed up-river and taken out of water so the thick ice of the bay wouldn't crush her.

== Replica ==
A replica of the original Nonsuch was commissioned by the Hudson's Bay Company to celebrate their tercentenary in 1970. She was crafted using tools and materials familiar to the seventeenth century. She was built by J. Hinks and Son shipyard, in Appledore, Devon, England and was crafted to be as close as possible to the original and featured many of the features ships of the time would have had such as "hiding cabins" (small bunks hidden within a cupboard). The vessel has peg board used for tracking position and speed, a charlie noble (a chimney with a mobile head). Like the original she was armed; the replica carries six 2-pounder muzzle-loading smoothbore guns. As with most ships of the era she was very ornate carrying many carvings that took months to complete. When completed, Nonsuch replica was placed on the MV Halifax City, owned by Charles Hills of Bristol, and carried to Canada. There Nonsuch sailed down the Atlantic coast of Canada and the United States. She also sailed through the Great Lakes and then was placed on a semi-trailer and taken to Seattle for a voyage down the Pacific coast. She was presented by the HBC to the citizens of Manitoba and placed on permanent display in 1973 in the Nonsuch Gallery at the Manitoba Museum in Winnipeg, Manitoba (then called the Manitoba Museum of Man and Nature). Built specifically for the ship, it is a 90-foot (27 m) gallery giving the feel of a seventeenth-century scene to visitors and shows the ship at the English port of Deptford, just before embarking on her journey to Hudson Bay.

- Length overall: 54 feet (16 m)
- Draught: 6 feet (1.8 m)
