= Médard des Groseilliers =

French explorer and fur trader

Médard Chouart des Groseilliers
- Born: 1618; Charly-sur-Marne, France
- Died: Unknown
- Occupations: Explorer, fur trader, Co-founder of Hudson's Bay Company

Médard Chouart des Groseilliers (1618 – ?) was a French explorer and fur trader in Canada. He is often paired with his brother-in-law Pierre-Esprit Radisson, who was about 20 years younger. The pair worked together in fur trading and exploration. Their decision to enter British service led to the foundation of the Hudson's Bay Company in 1670. This company established trading posts and extensive relations with the First Nations in western Canada. It was highly influential in making the region amenable to British colonization. Radisson, with Groseilliers, also mapped many of the Great Lakes and trading routes used by settlers.

== Early life ==
Médard Chouart was born in Charly-sur-Marne, Champagne province, France, to Médard Chouart, his father and Marie Poirier. He also had a cousin named Médard Chouart. He later called himself Sieur des Groseilliers after a farm his parents managed in Bassevelle. He was reported to have immigrated to New France in 1641 at age 23, but according to historian Grace Lee Nute, this has never been proven. He became a donné or lay helper at the Jesuit missions in the Wendat region near present-day Simcoe County, Ontario. Here he learned the skills of a coureur des bois. In 1646, Groseilliers fought with the Wendat against the Haudenosaunee.

On 3 September 1647 Groseilliers married the widowed Helène Martin, the daughter of Abraham Martin, whose land surrounding Quebec City later became famous as the Plains of Abraham. Their first child died in 1648. Their second child, also named Médard, was born in 1651, the same year Helène died. After the Haudenosaunee destroyed the Wendat missions and forced the people to move further west in the late 1640s, Groseilliers worked to re-establish trade, especially in the Lake Superior region.

In 1653, Groseilliers travelled to Acadia to meet with Claude de la Tour and returned to New France in July and established himself at Trois-Rivières. There he married his second wife, Marguérite Hayet (sometimes spelled Hayot), the widowed half-sister of Pierre-Esprit Radisson and from whom he inherited his lands in Trois-Rivières. Two sons from her first marriage became troublesome. In 1654, Groseilliers petitioned the governor of New France to find the boys another guardian, which was accepted. His first child by Marguérite, Jean Baptiste, was baptized on 5 July 1654. His second child by Marguérite, also named Marguérite, was baptized on 15 April 1659 and his third child, Marie-Antoinette, was baptized on 8 June 1661.

== As a fur trader ==
=== French service ===
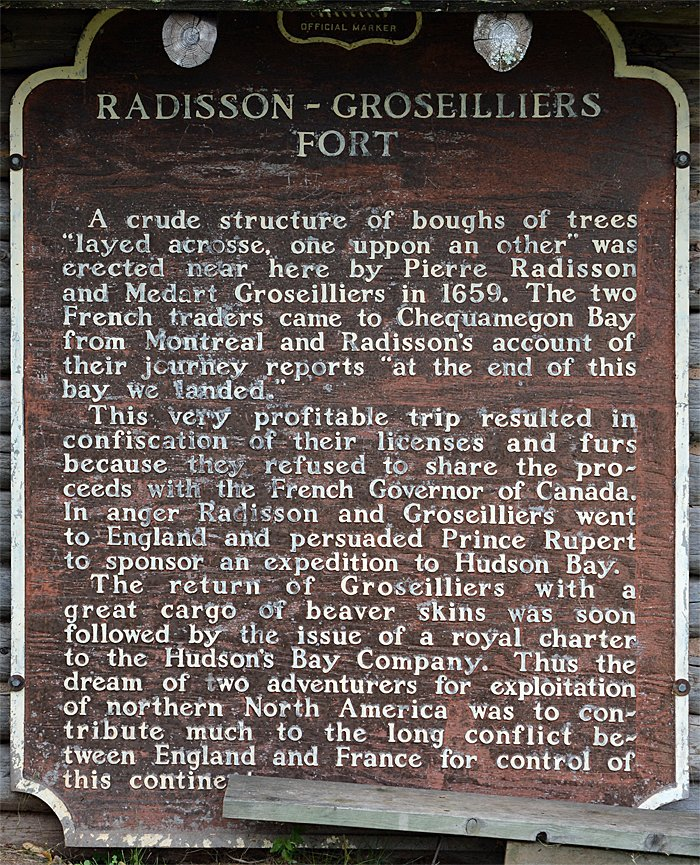
Historic marker in Ashland, Wisconsin

In August 1654, Groseilliers was sent west along with an unknown partner, to journey west to the new Wendat lands. The voyage took two years to complete and upon returning in August 1656, they carried in their canoes reports of contact with several First Nations, among them the Sioux, Potawatomi, Ho-Chunk, and Meskwaki peoples and furs worth "14 to 15 thousand livres". Leaving in August 1659, Groseilliers and Radisson traveled west to the far end of Lake Superior and wintered at Lac Courte Oreilles in what is now known as Wisconsin. According to Radisson's account of the voyage, they helped repel an Haudenosaunee attack along the Ottawa River and that the idea for trading furs from Hudson Bay came to them at this time. They returned in the summer of 1660 and upon return to New France, they were fined most of their profits by the colonial government because they had left New France without a license.

This journey demonstrated that the French could find riches in the interior of the continent and this led more Frenchmen to go west, with seven heading to Lake Superior within the year. From Cree traders, the French men came to understand that the main source of furs lay northwest of the lake. In 1661, Groseilliers traveled to France to appeal the fine without success and returned to New France the same year. Groseilliers and Radisson proposed creating a trading company for the furs to Jean-Baptiste Colbert, the French minister of finance under King Louis XIV. Colbert thought it a waste of resources and refused to support the project. In Spring 1662, Groseilliers and Radisson intended to journey to the west via the Hudson Bay region. In order to get to Hudson Bay from Isle Percée, Groseilliers intended to charter a vessel. However, the plans fell through and Groseilliers and Radisson instead searched further south in New England in hope of finding a suitable vessel.

=== Formation of the Hudson's Bay Company ===
Groseilliers and Radisson traveled to Boston in the Massachusetts Bay Colony. They organized another expedition into Hudson Bay in 1663, but it was turned back by the ice. At Boston in 1665 they met Sir George Cartwright, who told them to travel to England to gain support. Captured by Dutch privateers on the voyage, the French men were put ashore in Spain. Reaching England, they were presented to King Charles II and became associated with Prince Rupert. Eventually Prince Rupert chartered two vessels for Radisson and Groseilliers.

In 1668 two ships left England for Hudson Bay: Nonsuch under the command of Zachariah Gillam with Groseilliers as his second and Eaglet with William Stannard as captain and Radisson as his second. Eaglet was caught in a storm, was damaged and forced to return to England. Nonsuch made it to Hudson Bay and continued south, into James Bay. Nonsuch reached the mouth of the Rupert River which was named after their benefactor. They landed near what is now the town of Waskaganish, Quebec, where they built a fort and wintered there. The expedition returned to England in 1669 with a rich cargo of furs.

The haul of furs impressed King Charles and led Prince Rupert and his fellow investors to create the "Company of Adventurers of England Trading into Hudsons Bay", also known as the Hudson's Bay Company, on 2 May 1670. The Hudson's Bay Company was given monopoly over the area of land that would become known as Rupert's Land. From 1670 to 1675, Groseilliers and Radisson were employed by the Hudson's Bay Company, voyaging into Hudson Bay to establish trading posts, forts and exploring the area. Their activities were watched with interest by the French whose economy suffered from the arrival of English fur traders.

=== Return to French service ===
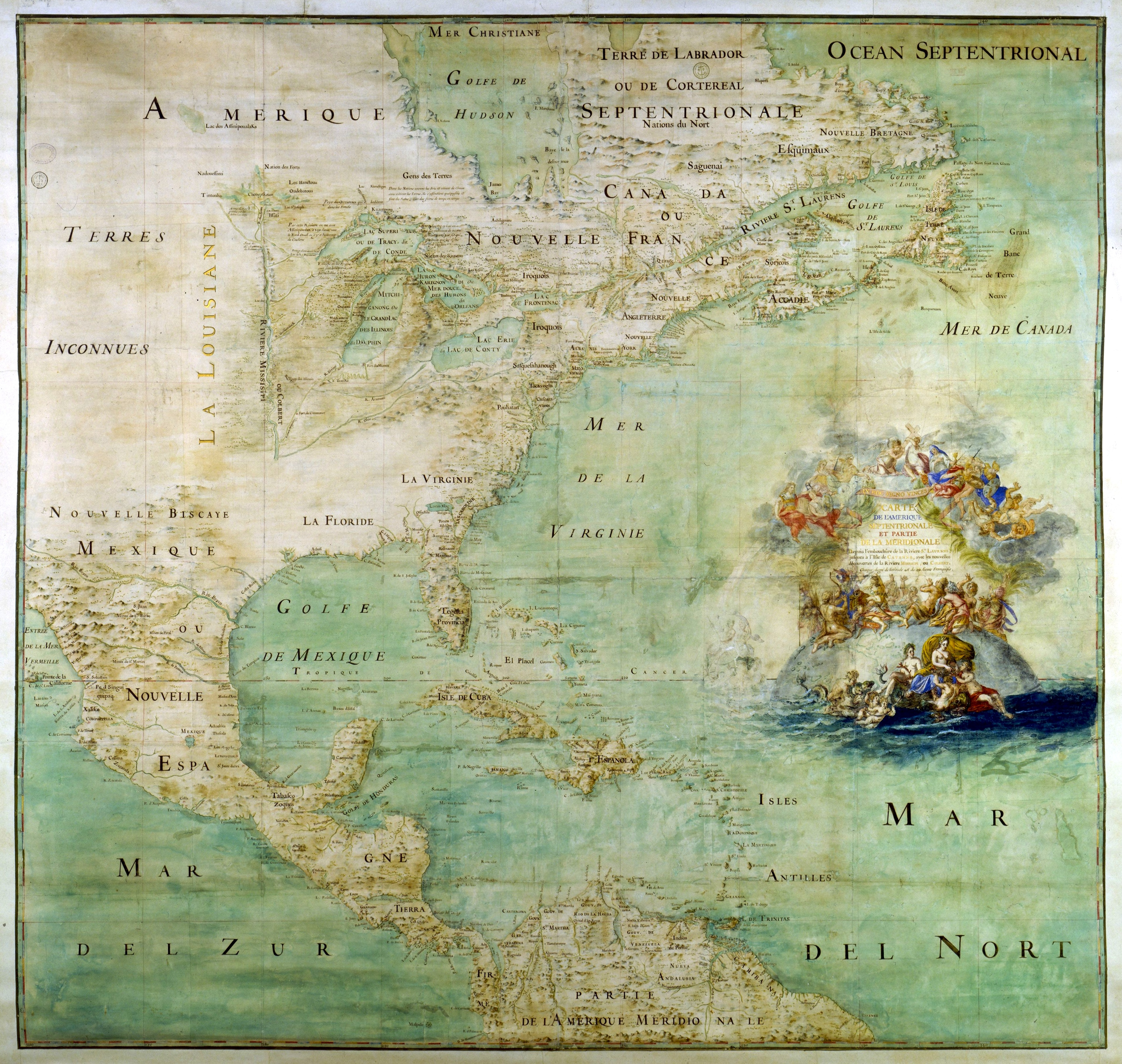
1681 French map of the New World above the equator: New France and the Great Lakes in the north, with a dark line as the Mississippi River to the west in the Illinois Country and the mouth of the river (and future New Orleans) then terra incognita

In 1674, a French Jesuit priest, Charles Albanel, was sent north into Hudson Bay. Captured by representatives of the Hudson's Bay Company, Albanel was sent to England as a prisoner. In England he convinced Groseilliers and Radisson to return to French service. Groseilliers traveled to France and spent the year before returning to New France in 1676.

On 20 May 1682 the French created their own fur-trading company, called La Compagnie de la Baie d’Hudson or Compagnie du Nord, given charter by the French government. The company was created to compete with the Hudson's Bay Company. Groseilliers joined the company and with Radisson, sailed north to the Hayes and Nelson Rivers to create a French trading post. Similar expeditions from the Hudson's Bay Company and a group from Boston under the leadership of Benjamin Gillam arrived at the same time. The three groups fought with the experienced leadership of Radisson and Groseilliers coming out victorious. They took the majority of the Bostonians and Hudson's Bay Company personnel captive, including the new governor of Hudson Bay, John Bridgar and seized furs from their former employer.

Upon their return to New France, the two Frenchmen found that their actions had angered the British and alarmed French officials. In order to cover the British losses, the Compagnie du Nord was forced to pay taxes on their furs. Radisson and Groseilliers sailed to France in 1683 for adjudication on the tax matter. The French government found in favour of the British, whose leader the Duke of York was France's best chance to re-convert the English back to Catholicism. While in France, Groseilliers refused an offer to rejoin the Hudson's Bay Company and returned to his farm at Trois-Rivières. His final fate is unknown.

== See also ==
- CCGS Des Groseilliers, a Canadian Coast Guard ship named for the explorer.

== Sources ==
- Axelrod, Alan (2011). A Savage Empire: Trappers, Traders, Tribes, and the Wars That Made America. St. Martin's Press. ISBN 978-0-312-57656-1.
- Innis, Harold A. (1999) [1930]. The Fur Trade in Canada: An Introduction to Canadian Economic History. University of Toronto Press. ISBN 978-0-8020-8196-4.
- Kellogg, Louise Phelps (2007) [1925]. The French Regime in Wisconsin and the Northwest. Heritage Books. ISBN 978-0-7884-1766-5.
- Nute, Grace Lee (1978). Caesars of the Wilderness: Médard Chouart, Sieur Des Groseilliers and Pierre Esprit Radisson, 1618-1710. Minnesota Historical Society Press. ISBN 978-0-87351-128-5.
- Nute, Grace Lee (1979) [1966]. "Chouart des Groseilliers, Médard". In Brown, George Williams (ed.). Dictionary of Canadian Biography. Vol. I (1000–1700) (online ed.). University of Toronto Press.
- Olson, James S.; Shadle, Robert, eds. (1996). "Chouart des Groseilliers, Médard". Historical Dictionary of the British Empire. Vol. A–J. Greenwood. p. 297. ISBN 978-0-313-29366-5.
- Upham, Warren (1905). "Groseilliers and Radisson, the First White Men in Minnesota, 1655-56, and 1659-60, and their Discovery of the Upper Mississippi River". Collections of the Minnesota Historical Society. XX (Part II). The Society: 449–594. – Also Collections of the Minnesota Historical Society, p. 452, at Google Books
