= List of conflicts in North America =

This is a list of conflicts in North America. This list includes all present-day countries starting northward first from Northern America (Canada, Greenland, and the United States of America), southward to Middle America (Aridoamerica, Oasisamerica, and Mesoamerica in Mexico; and Central America over Panama, Belize, Costa Rica, El Salvador, Guatemala, Honduras, and Nicaragua), and eastward to the Caribbean (Cuba, Haiti, Jamaica, Grenada, Saint Martin, the Dominican Republic, and the Republic of Trinidad and Tobago). Conflicts are also arranged chronologically starting from the Pre-Columbian era (the Lithic, Archaic, Formative, Classic, Post-Classic, and Colonial periods/stages of North America and Mesoamerica; c. 18000 BCE – c. 1821 CE) up to the post-colonial period (c. 1821 CE – Present). This list includes any raid, strike, skirmish, siege, sacking, and/or battle (land, naval, and air) that occurred on the territories of what may today be referred to as falling within any of the aforementioned modern nations; however, in which the conflict itself may have only been part of an operation of a campaign in a theater of a greater war (e.g. any and/or all border, undeclared, colonial, proxy, liberation, global, Indian wars, etc.). There may also be periods of violent, civil unrest listed; such as, shootouts, spree killings, massacres, terrorist attacks, coups, assassinations, regicides, riots, rebellions, revolutions, and civil wars (as well as wars of succession and/or independence). The list might also contain episodes of human sacrifice, mass suicide, and ethnic cleansing/genocide.

== Northern America ==
Territorial evolution of North America of non-native nation states from 1750 to 2008.

=== Bermuda ===
As a British Colony Bermuda served as a staging point for Great Britain during the American Revolution and War of 1812. During the Battle of the Atlantic the island served as an allied airbase for Anti-submarine warfare submarine hunters. NATO also used Bermuda as a base during the Cold War.

=== Canada ===
==== 11th century ====
- 1020s Skirmishes between Norse and native peoples in the Vinland settlement

==== 16th century ====
- 1534 Battle of Bae de Bic
- 1540-1924 American Indian Wars
- 1577 Skirmishes between English sailors under Martin Frobisher and Inuit on Baffin Island

==== 17th century ====
- 1600s Beaver Wars
  - 1610 Battle of Sorel
  - 1628 Action of 17 July 1628
  - 1644 Action at Ville-Marie
  - 1649 Raid on St. Ignace and St. Louis
  - 1660 Battle of Long Sault
  - 1689 Lachine massacre
  - 1691 Battle of La Prairie
  - 1692 Mohawk Valley raid
- 1600s Anglo-French conflicts
  - 1613 Battle of Port Royal
  - 1628 Capture of Tadoussac
  - 1628 Naval action in the St. Lawrence River
  - 1629 Capture of Quebec
  - 1629 Siege of Baleine
  - 1630 Siege of Fort St. Louis
  - 1632 Raid on St. John
  - 1640 Battle of Port Royal
  - 1654 Battle of Port Royal
  - 1686 Hudson Bay expedition
  - 1688 Battle of Fort Albany
- 1640–1701 French and Iroquois Wars
  - 1692 Battle of Fort Vercheres
- 1643–1650 Acadian Civil War
  - 1643 Battle of Port Royal
  - 1645 Battle of Fort La Tour
- 1674 Dutch Occupation of Acadia
- 1677 Battle of Port La Tour
- 1689–1697 King William's War
  - 1689 Battle of the Lake of Two Mountains
  - 1690 Battle of Coulée Grou
  - 1690 Battle of Port Royal
  - 1690 Battle at Chedabucto
  - 1690 Battle of Quebec
  - 1693 Battle of Fort Albany
  - 1694 Capture of York Factory
  - 1696 Naval action in the Bay of Fundy
  - 1696 Raid on Chignecto
  - 1696 Siege of Fort Nashwaak
  - 1696–1697 Avalon Peninsula Campaign
    - 1696 Siege of Ferryland
    - 1696 Raid on Petty Harbour
    - 1696 Siege of St. John's
    - 1697 Battle of Carbonear
  - 1697 Battle of Hudson's Bay

==== 18th century ====
- 1702–1713 Queen Anne's War

- 1702 Raid on Newfoundland
- 1704 Raid on Chignecto
- 1704 Raid on Grand Pré
- 1705 Siege of St. John's
- 1707 Siege of Port Royal
- 1709 Battle of St. John's
- 1709 Battle of Fort Albany
- 1710 Siege of Port Royal
- 1711 Battle of Bloody Creek

- 1722–1725 Father Rale's War

- 1722 Battle of Winnepang
- 1723 Raid on Canso
- 1724 Raid on Annapolis Royal
- 1725 Raid on Canso

- 1744–1748 King George's War

- 1744 Raid on Canso
- 1744 Siege of Fort Anne
- 1745 Siege of Port Toulouse
- 1745 Siege of Louisbourg
- 1746 Battle at Port-la-Joye
- 1747 Battle of Grand Pré

- 1749–1755 Father Le Loutre's War

- 1749 Raid on Dartmouth
- 1749 Siege of Grand Pre
- 1749–1750 Battles at Chignecto
- 1750 Battle at St. Croix
- 1751 Raid on Dartmouth
- 1751 Raid on Chignecto
- 1751 Raids on Halifax
- 1753 Attack at Country Harbour

- 1754–1763 Seven Years' War

- 1755 Naval Action off Newfoundland
- 1755 Battle of Fort Beauséjour
- 1755 Bay of Fundy Campaign
- 1755 Battle of Petitcodiac
- 1756 Raid on Lunenburg
- 1757 Battle on Snowshoes
- 1757 Battle of Bloody Creek
- 1758 Siege of Louisbourg
- 1758 Battle of Fort Frontenac
- 1758 Gulf of St. Lawrence Campaign
- 1758 Île Saint-Jean Campaign
- 1758 Petitcodiac River Campaign
- 1758 Battle on Snowshoes – occurred in the British Province of New York and New France.
- 1759 St. John River Campaign
- 1759 Battle of Beauport
- 1759 Battle of the Plains of Abraham
- 1759 St. Francis Raid
- 1760 Battle of Sainte-Foy
- 1760 Siege of Quebec
- 1760 Battle of Restigouche
- 1760 Montreal Campaign
- 1760 Battle of the Thousand Islands
- 1762 Battle of Signal Hill

- 1763–1766 Pontiac's War

- 1763 Battle of Point Pelee
- 1763 Siege of Fort Pitt
- 1763 Battle of Bushy Run

- 1774 Lord Dunmore's War

- 1774 Yellow Creek massacre
- 1774 Battle of Point Pleasant

- 1775–1776 American Revolutionary War
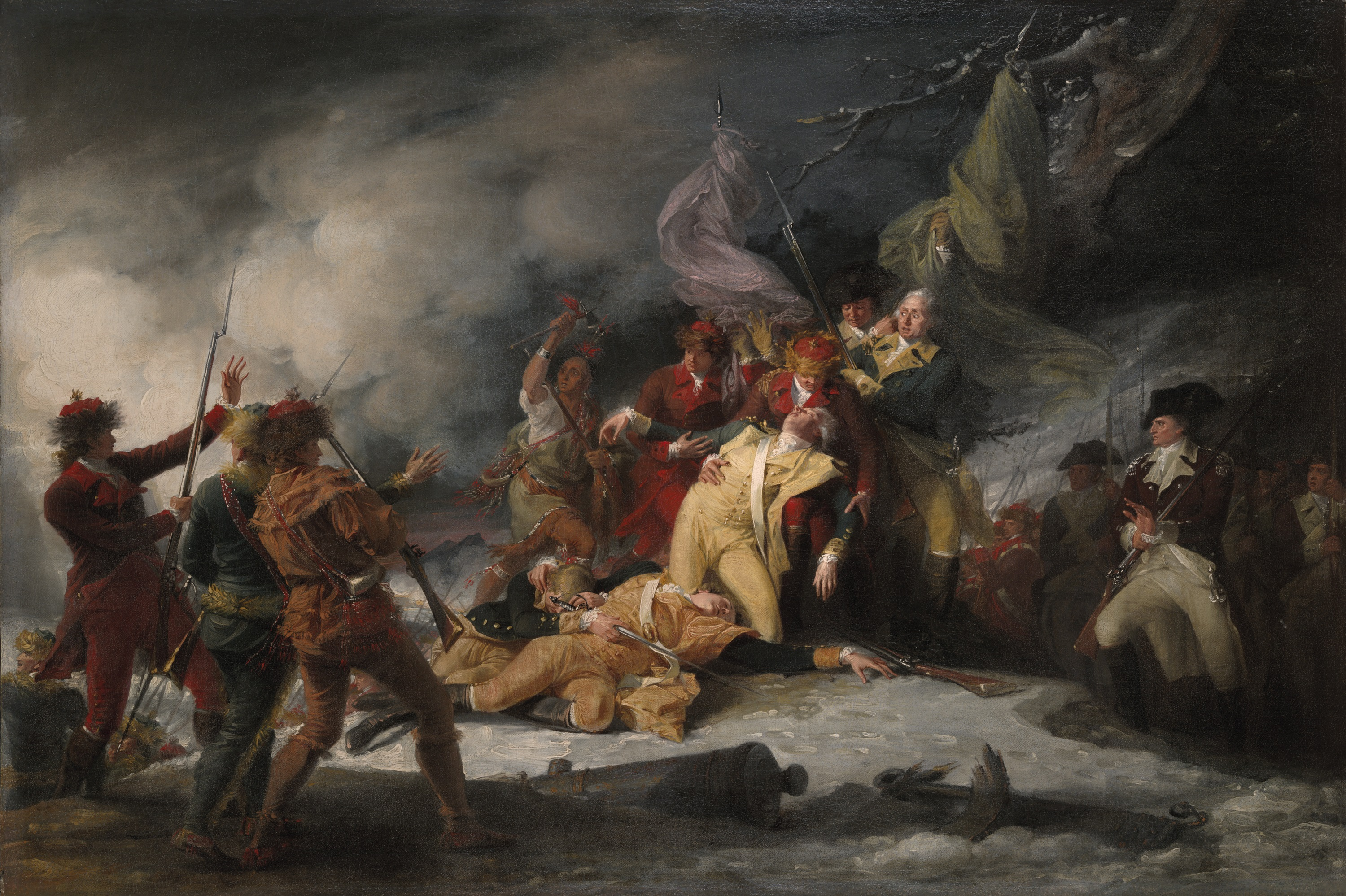
  The Battle of Quebec where the early United States attempted to convince Quebec to join the American Revolution for independence from the British. The British victory assured that British Canada would not join the United States. The Death of General Montgomery in the Attack on Quebec, December 31, 1775 by John Trumbull

- 1775 Invasion of Canada
- 1775 Arnold's expedition to Quebec
- 1775 Battle of Longue-Pointe
- 1775 Siege of Fort St. Jean
- 1775 Battle of Quebec
- 1776 Battle of the Cedars
- 1776 Battle of Saint-Pierre
- 1776 Battle of Trois-Rivières
- 1776 Battle of Fort Cumberland
- 1777 Siege of Saint John
- 1781 Naval battle off Cape Breton
- 1782 Naval battle off Halifax
- 1782 Raid on Lunenburg
- 1782 Hudson Bay Expedition

- 1789 Nootka Crisis
- 1792 Destruction of Opitsaht
- 1793 Raids on Pine Island Fort
- 1792–1797 War of the First Coalition

- 1796 Newfoundland expedition

==== 19th century ====
- 1800 United Irish Uprising
- 1811 Tonquin incident
- 1812 War of 1812

- 1812 Raid on Gananoque
- 1812 Battle of Queenston Heights
- 1812 Naval action off Kingston
- 1812 Battle of Lacolle Mills
- 1813 Raid on Elizabethtown
- 1813 Battle of York
- 1813 Battle of Fort George
- 1813 Battle of Stoney Creek
- 1813 Battle of Beaver Dams
- 1813 Capture of the Growler and the Julia
- 1813 Battle of Chateauguay
- 1813 The "Burlington Races"
- 1813 Battle of River Canard
- 1813 Battle of the Thames
- 1813 Massequoi Village
- 1813 Battle of Crysler's Farm
- 1814 Battle of Longwoods
- 1814 Battle of Lacolle Mills
- 1814 Battle of Odelltown
- 1814 Raid on Port Dover
- 1814 Capture of Fort Erie
- 1814 Battle of Chippawa
- 1814 Battle of Lundy's Lane
- 1814 Siege of Fort Erie
- 1814 Engagements on Lake Huron
  - 1814 Action at Nottawasaga
  - 1814 Capture of the Tigress and the Scorpion
- 1814 Capture of Fort Erie
- 1814 Siege of Fort Erie
- 1814 Battle of Cook's Mills
- 1814 Battle of Malcolm's Mills

- 1816 Pemmican War

- 1816 Capture of Fort Gibraltar
- 1816 Battle of Seven Oaks
- 1816 Capture of Fort Douglas
- 1816 Capture of Fort William

- 1835–1845 Shiners' War
- 1837–1838 Lower Canada Rebellion

- 1837 Battle of Saint-Denis
- 1837 Battle of Saint-Charles
- 1837 Battle of Saint-Eustache
- 1838 Battle of Lacolle
- 1838 Battle of Odelltown
- 1838 Battle of Beauharnois

- 1837–1838 Upper Canada Rebellion

- 1837 Battle of Montgomery's Tavern
- 1838 Battle of Pelee Island
- 1838 Short Hills Raid
- 1838 Battle of the Windmill
- 1838 Battle of Windsor

- 1838 Aroostook War
- 1838 Nicola's War
- 1849 Courthouse Rebellion
- 1849 Montreal Riots
- 1849 Stony Monday Riot
- 1858 Fraser Canyon Gold Rush skirmishes along the Okanagan Trail
- 1858 Fraser Canyon War
- 1859 McGowan's War
- 1859 Pig War
- 1863 Lamalcha War
- 1864 Chilcotin War
- 1864 Kingfisher Incident
- 1866–1871 Fenian Raids

- 1866 Battle of Ridgeway
- 1866 Battle of Fort Erie
- 1866 Battle of Pigeon Hill
- 1870 Battle of Eccles Hill
- 1870 Battle of Trout River

- 1867 Grouse Creek War
- 1869–1870 Red River Rebellion

- 1870 Wolseley Expedition

- 1870 Battle of the Belly River
- 1873 Cypress Hill smoke Massacre
- 1885 North-West Rebellion

- 1885 Battle of Duck Lake
- 1885 Frog Lake Massacre
- 1885 Battle of Fort Pitt
- 1885 Battle of Fish Creek
- 1885 Battle of Cut Knife
- 1885 Battle of Batoche
- 1885 Battle of Frenchman's Butte
- 1885 Battle of Loon Lake

- 1886 Anti-Chinese Riots
- 1887 Wild Horse Creek War

==== 20th century ====
- 1902 – June 22: Toronto Streetcar Strike riot
- 1907 – Anti-Oriental Riots (Vancouver)
- 1913 – Vancouver Island War
- 1918 – Conscription Crisis of 1917
- 1918 – Vancouver General Strike
- 1919 – Winnipeg General Strike
- 1925 – New Waterford Rebellion. See Davis Day.
- 1926 – Regina Riots
- 1933 – August 16: Christie Pits riot in Toronto.
- 1935 – The On-to-Ottawa Trek and Regina Riot.
- 1935 – The Battle of Ballantyne Pier
- 1938 – Bloody Sunday
- 1939–1945 – Second World War

- 1939–1945 – Battle of the Atlantic
- 1940 – Occupation of St. Pierre and Miquelon
- 1942–1944 – Battle of the St. Lawrence
- 1942 – Bombardment of Estevan Point lighthouse
- 1944 – Terrace Mutiny
- 1945 – Halifax Riot on Victory in Europe Day.

- 1955 – Richard Riot
- 1967 – Yorkville, Toronto summer street sit-ins and "riots".
- 1969 – Murray-Hill riot
- 1970 – FLQ – October Crisis
- 1971 – Gastown Riots
- 1982 – October 14: The Squamish Five, bombs a Litton Industries factory.
- 1983 – Solidarity Crisis
- 1990 – July 11 to September 26: Oka Crisis
- 1990–1992 – Strike, strike-breaking, and bombing at Royal Oak Mines in Yellowknife, NWT
- 1993 – June 9: Montreal Stanley Cup Riot
- 1994 – June 14: Vancouver Stanley Cup Riot
- 1995 – Gustafsen Lake Standoff
- 1995 – Ipperwash Crisis
- 1997–2000 – Wiebo Ludwig and his followers bomb wellheads in Alberta's oil country

==== 21st century ====
- February 28, 2006 – July 2011 Caledonia land dispute
- 2009 Vancouver gang war
- January 22 — February 23, 2022 Canada convoy protest

=== Greenland ===
- Early 1400s Possible Thule-Norse Greenlander Conflict
- 1939-1945 Greenland in World War II

=== United States ===
This includes all conflicts that have taken place within the modern territory of the United States. See also

- List of conflicts in the United States
- List of incidents of civil unrest in the United States
- List of rampage killers in the Americas
- List of wars involving the United States
- United States military casualties of war

==== Puerto Rico ====
Puerto Rico is geographically located within the Caribbean; however, because Puerto Rico territory of the United States the island's conflicts are listed here.

- 1511 Taino rebellion
- 1568–1648 Eighty Years' War
  - September 24, 1625 Battle of San Juan
- 1868 Grito de Lares
- April 25 – August 12, 1898 Spanish–American War
  - May 12, 1898 Bombardment of San Juan
  - June 22, 1898 Second Battle of San Juan
  - June 28, 1898 Third Battle of San Juan
  - 1898 U.S. invasion of Puerto Rico through Guanica in the south of the island

==== Precolonial ====
This includes all known conflicts that occurred within the territory of the United States of America prior to European exploration.

- 1140-1150 Collapse of Early Pueblo culture in Chaco Canyon
- 1300 Fall of Cahokia
- 1325 Crow Creek massacre

==== American Indian Wars ====
This list covers all wars regarding Native Americans and First Nations within the 49 continental states of the United States (does not include territories) and the 10 provinces and 3 territories of Canada. This includes conflicts fought between American Indian and First Nation tribes and wars against encroachment from European Colonial Powers or the United States and Canada. Generally American Indian Wars classifies all conflicts for Native Americans and First Nations between 1540 and 1924 however this list also includes 20th century incidents on Indian Reservations.

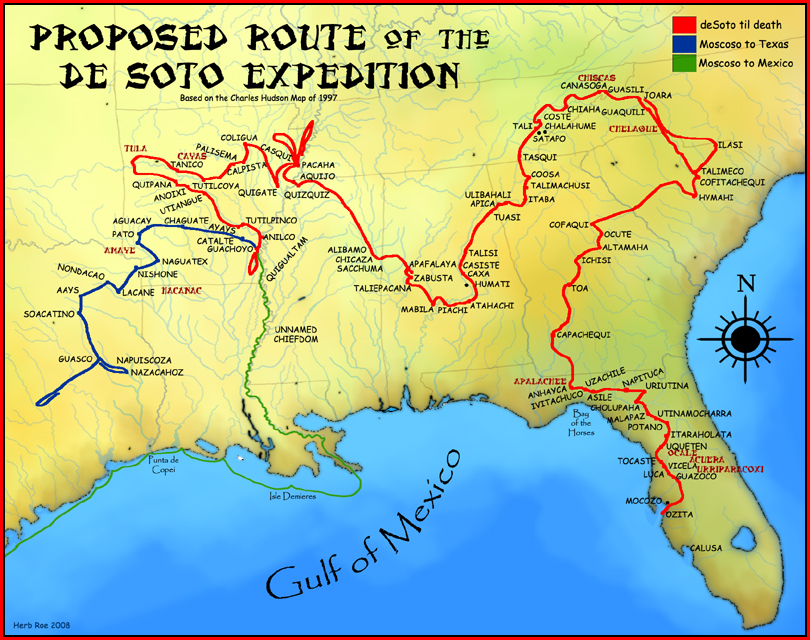
Hernando De Soto's expedition through the Southeast United States was the first major conflict between Europeans and Native Americans in the U.S. Thousands of natives were killed by the expedition, and the majority of the expedition including De Soto did not survive the journey.

- 1540-1542 Herando de Soto's Expedition
- 1609–1701 Beaver Wars

- February 1692 Mohawk Valley raid

- 1610–1646 Anglo-Powhatan Wars

- 1610–1614 First Anglo-Powhatan War
- 1622–1632 Second Anglo-Powhatan War
- 1644–1646 Third Anglo-Powhatan War

- 1634–1638 Pequot War
- 1640 French and Iroquois Wars
- 1643 Kieft's War
- 1659 First Esopus War
- 1663 Second Esopus War
- 1675–1678 King Philip's War
- 1680 Pueblo Revolt
- 1689–1697 King William's War
- 1702–1713 Queen Anne's War
- 1706–1877 Comanche Wars
- 1711-1715 Tuscarora War
- 1715–1717 Yamasee War
- 1744–1748 King George's War
- 1760-1850 Russian Colonization of the Americas

- 1784 Awa'uq Massacre
- 1804 Battle of Sitka

- 1758–1761 Anglo-Cherokee War
- 1763 Pontiac's Rebellion
- 1774 Dunmore's War
- 1776-1795 Cherokee-American wars
- 1785–1795 Northwest Indian War
- Tecumseh's War 1811-1813
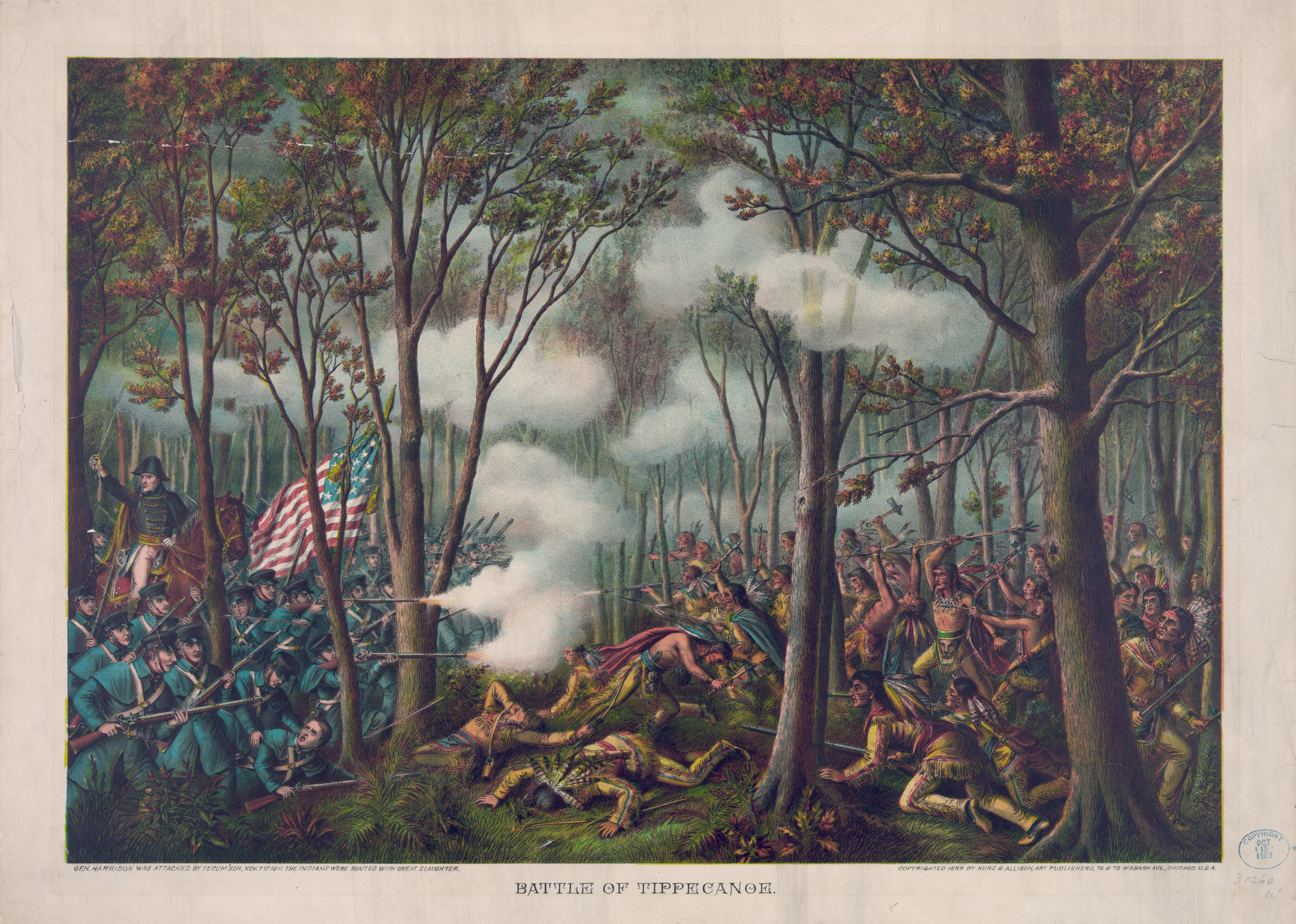
  Print shows Battle of Tippecanoe in Battle Ground Indiana where the U.S Army defeated warriors of Tecumseh's Confederacy. Part of Tecumseh's War against the United States.

- 1811 Battle of Tippecanoe

- 1813–1814 Creek War
- 1816–1858 Seminole Wars
- 1820–1875 Texas–Indian wars
- August 1823 Arikara War
- 1832 Black Hawk War
- 1835–1842 Second Seminole War
- 1842 1842 Slave Revolt in the Cherokee Nation
- 1846–1866 Navajo Wars
- 1849–1924 Apache Wars

- Victorio's War
- Renegade period of the Apache Wars 1881-1924

- Geronimo's War 1881-1886

- 1849–1923 Ute Wars
- 1849–1855 Jicarilla War
- 1850-1880 California Indian Wars
- 1850–1851 Mariposa War

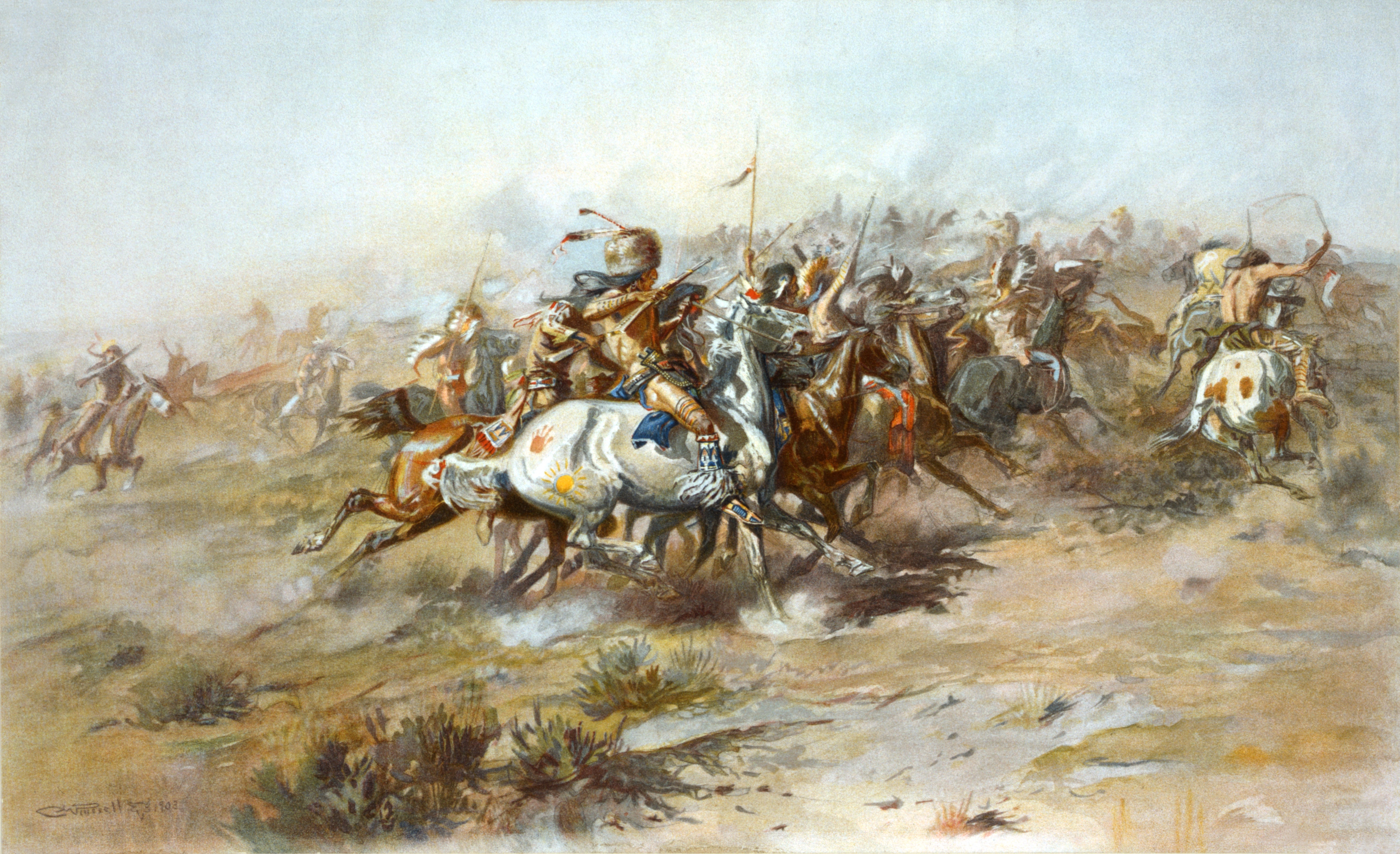
The Battle of Little Bighorn near the Little Bighorn river in the state a Montana. A confederation of Lakatoa and allied tribes defeated the U.S. 7th Cavalry Regiment. Part of the Great Sioux War which was an ultimately a victory of the U.S. Government. Painting is The Custer Fight by Charles Marion Russell.

- Sioux Wars 1854–1891

- August 19, 1854 Grattan massacre
- 1862 Dakota War
- 1863–1865 Colorado War::*August 1 – September 24, 1865
- Powder River Expedition
- 1866–1868 Red Cloud's War
- 1876-1877 Great Sioux War
- December 29, 1890 – January 15, 1891 Ghost Dance War

- December 29, 1890 Wounded Knee Massacre

- 1855–1856 Yakima War
- February 1856 Tintic War
- 1857–1858 Utah War
- 1859–1860 Mendocino War
- 1860 Paiute War
- 1862 Dakota War
- 1865–1872 Black Hawk War
- 1872–1873 Modoc War
- 1879 White River War
- 1898 Battle of Sugar Point
- March 1914 – March 11, 1915 Bluff War
- March 20–23, 1923 Posey War
- February 27 – May 8, 1973 Wounded Knee incident
- June 26, 1975 Pine Ridge Shootout

==== 17th century ====
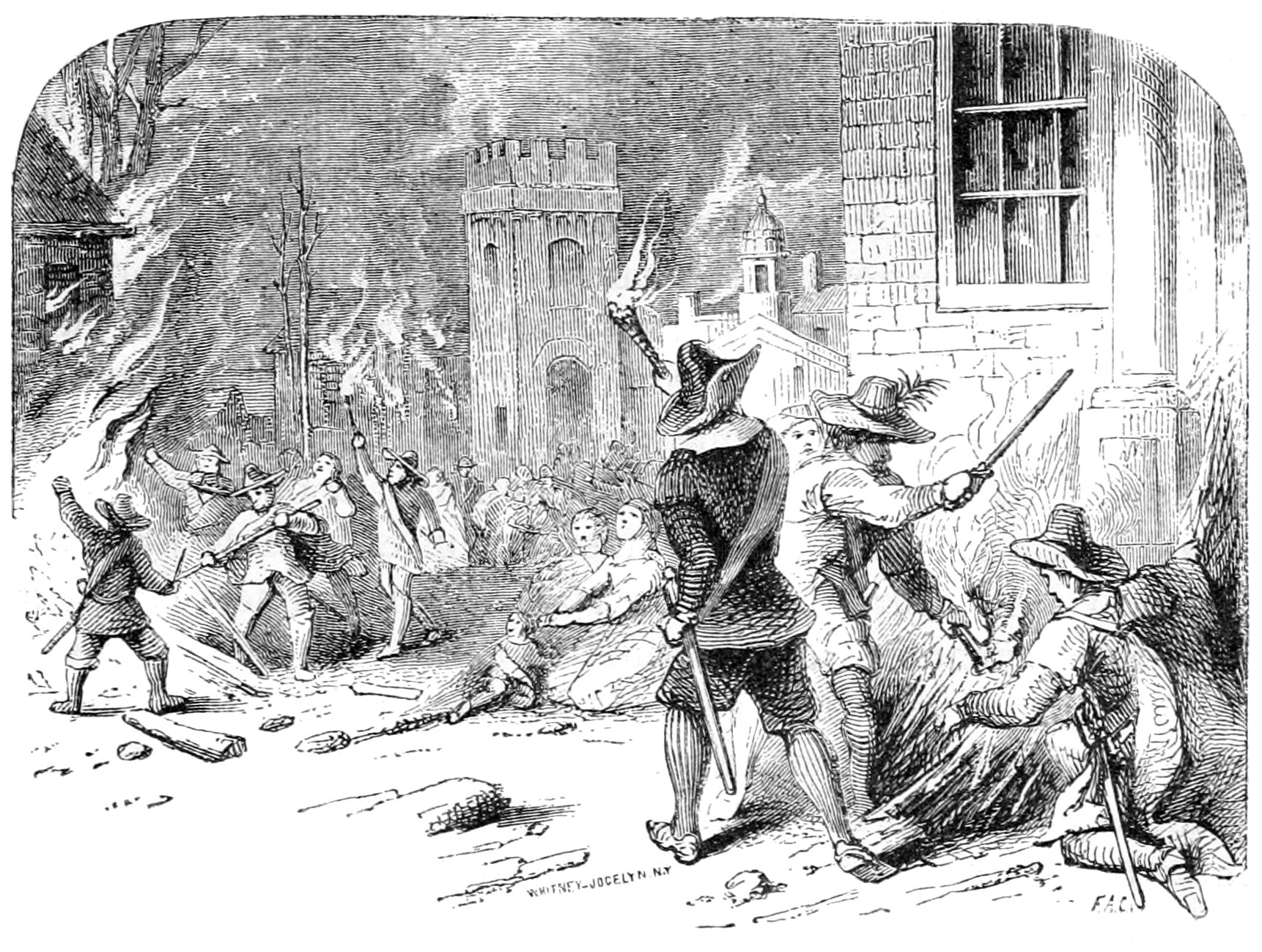
The Burning of Jamestown, Virginia by Bacon's Rebellion. Common Indentured Servants and African Slaves fought together against the government of Colonial Virginia. The Rebellion's failure caused a hardening of racial lines in Colonial English America.

This covers all conflicts in the 1600s that occurred between rival European Colonial Powers, or between Colonists and their Colonial Administration. This section does not include conflicts regarding Native Americans.

- August 27, 1664 The annexation of New Netherland by the English
  - English conquest of New Amsterdam (New York City)
- 1665–1667 Second Anglo-Dutch War
  - June 1667, a Dutch warship attacked Old Point Comfort
- 1672–1674 Third Anglo-Dutch War
  - August 1673 The Dutch recaptured New Netherland
  - November 1674 The Treaty of Westminster concluded the war and ceded New Netherland to the English
- 1676 Bacon's Rebellion
- September 1688 – September 1697 King William's War
  - June 27, 1689 Raid on Dover
  - August 2–3, 1689 Siege of Pemaquid
  - March 27, 1690 Raid on Salmon Falls
  - May 20–21, 1690 Battle of Fort Loyal
  - January 24, 1692 Raid on York
  - June 10–13, 1692 Raid on Wells
  - July 18, 1694 Raid on Oyster River
  - August 14–15, 1696 Siege of Pemaquid
  - March 15, 1697 Raid on Haverhill

==== 18th century ====
This covers all conflicts in the 1700s that occurred between rival European Colonial Powers, or between the early United States against European Colonial Powers. Many of the wars in this period were extensions of wars from continental Europe. This section does not include conflicts regarding Native Americans.

- 1701–1714 Queen Anne's War

- October 7–18, 1702 Battle of Flint River
- November 10 – December 30, 1702 Siege of St. Augustine
- August 10 – October 6, 1703 Northeast Coast Campaign
- February 29, 1704 Raid on Deerfield
- January 25–26, 1704 Apalachee massacre
- September 1706 Charles Town expedition
- August 12 – November 30, 1707 Siege of Pensacola
- August 29, 1708 Raid on Haverhill

- Slave Revolts in Colonial English America

- 1712 New York Slave Revolt of 1712
- 1739 Stono Rebellion

- December 16, 1740 – October 18, 1748 King George's War
  - July 19 – September 5, 1745 Northeast Coast Campaign
  - November 28, 1745 Raid on Saratoga
  - August 19–20, 1746 Siege of Fort Massachusetts
  - April 7–9, 1747 Siege of Fort at Number 4

*1754–1763 The French and Indian War

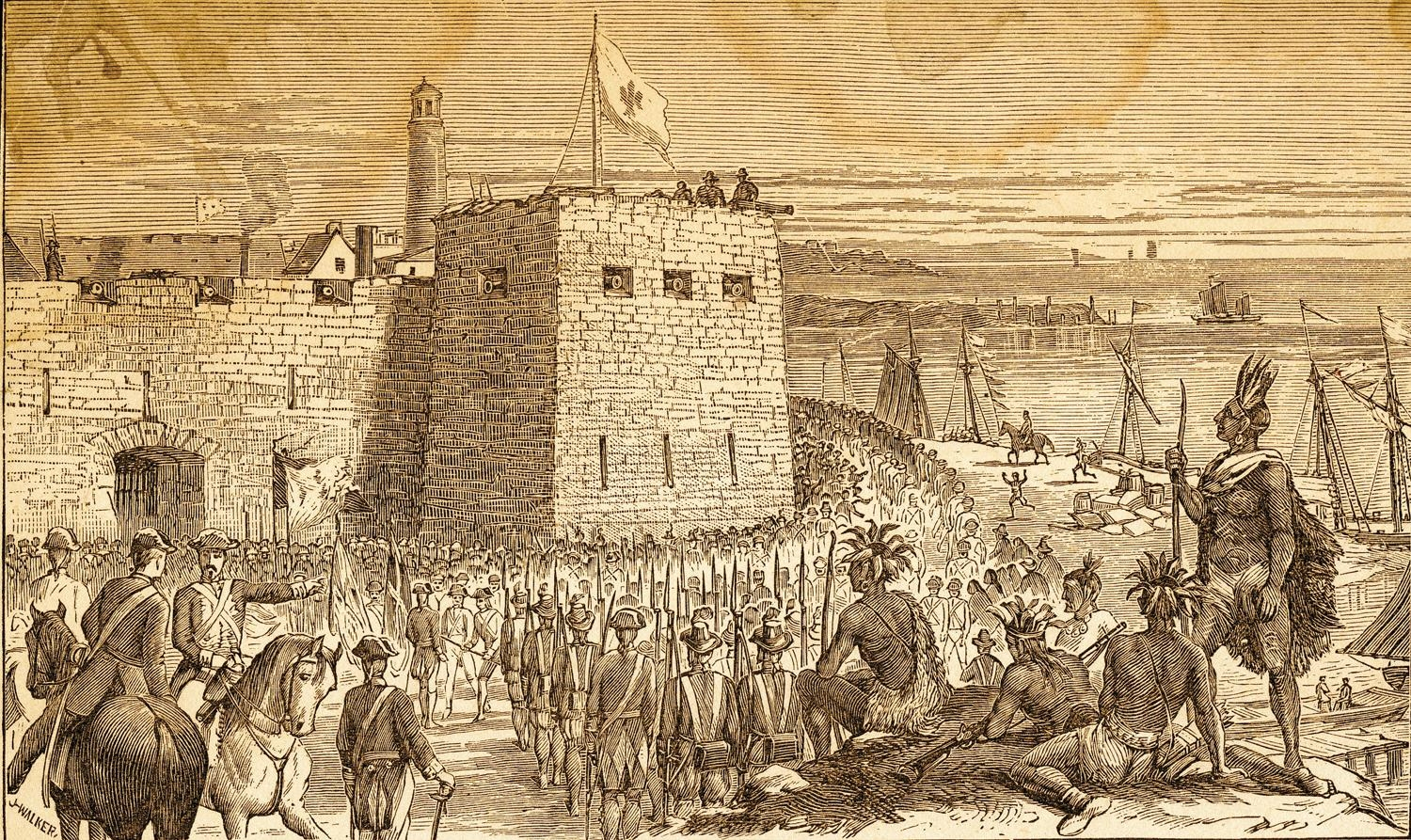
Battle of Fort Oswego fought in Oswego, New York part of the French an Indian War. An alliance of French and Native American tribes defeated a British assault. New France enjoyed strong relations with Natives in the Great Lakes Region. Despite early French victories British supremacy on the sea assured victory in the overall war. Drawing by J.Walker

Was fought within both Canada and the United States

- May 28, 1754 Battle of Jumonville Glen
- July 3, 1754 Battle of Fort Necessity
- June 16, 1755 Battle of Fort Beauséjour
- July 9, 1755 Braddock Expedition
- 1755 Battle of Lake George
- April 18, 1756 Battle of Great Cacapon
- August, 1756 Battle of Fort Oswego
- September 8, 1756 Kittanning Expedition
- January 21, 1757 Battle on Snowshoes
- July 26, 1757 Battle of Sabbath Day Point
- August 9, 1757 Battle of Fort William Henry
- March 23, 1758 Battle on Snowshoes
- July 27, 1758 Battle of Louisburg
- August, 1758 Battle of Fort Frontenac
- July 8, 1758 Battle of Carillon
- September 14, 1758 Battle of Fort Duquesne
- October 12, 1758 Battle of Fort Ligonier
- November 25, 1758 Forbes Expedition
- 1759 Battle of Ticonderoga
- 1759 Battle of Fort Niagara
- July 31, 1759 Battle of Beauport
- 1762 Battle of Signal Hill

- 1764–1771 War of the Regulation

- 1774–1776 Boston campaign
- 1775–1776 Invasion of Canada
- 1776 New York Campaign
- 1777 Saratoga Campaign
- 1779 Sullivan Expedition

1775–1783 American Revolutionary War

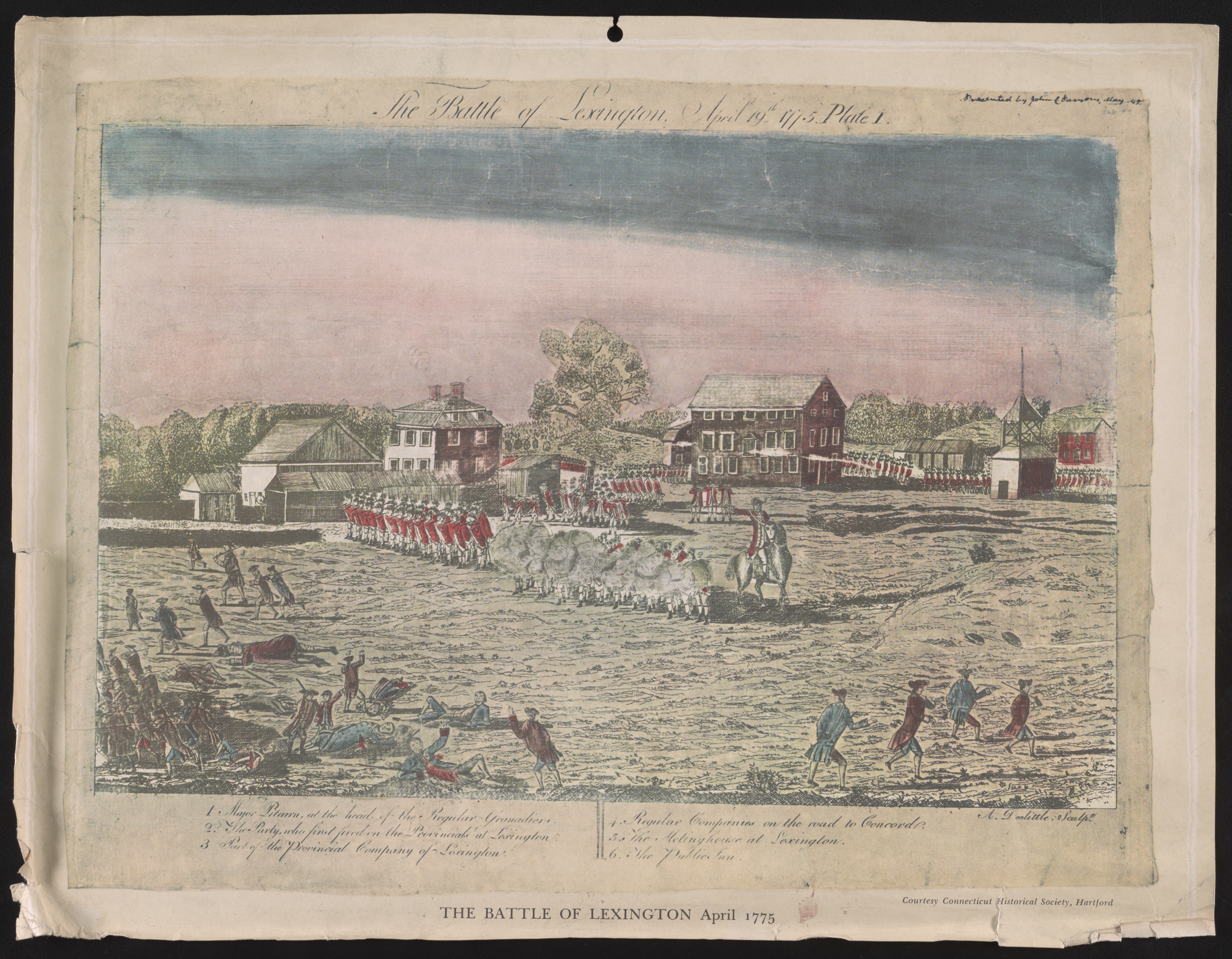
The first of four engravings of the Battle of Lexington and Concord by Amos Doolittle from 1775. Doolittle visited the battle sites and interviewed soldiers and witnesses. Contains controversial elements, possibly inaccuracies. Fire from the militia may have occurred but is not depicted.

- April 19, 1775 Battle of Lexington and Concord
- April 20, 1775 – March 17, 1776 Siege of Boston
- May 10, 1775 Capture of Fort Ticonderoga
- June 11–12, 1775 Battle of Machias
- June 17, 1775 Battle of Bunker Hill
- August 8, 1775 Battle of Gloucester
- August 23 – November 3, 1775 Siege of Fort St. Jean
- September 24, 1775 Battle of Longue-Pointe
- November 14, 1775 Battle of Kemp's Landing
- November 28 – December 9, 1775 Battle of Great Bridge
- February 27, 1776 Battle of Moore's Creek Bridge
- March 2–4, 1776 Fortification of Dorchester Heights
- March 2–3, 1776 Battle of the Rice Boats
- May 15–26, 1776 Battle of the Cedars
- June 8, 1776 Battle of Trois-Rivières
- August 27, 1776 Battle of Long Island
- September 15, 1776 Landing at Kip's Bay
- September 16, 1776 Battle of Harlem Heights
- October 11, 1776 Battle of Valcour Bay
- October 28, 1776 Battle of White Plains
- December 26, 1776 Battle of Trenton
- January 3, 1777 Battle of Princeton
- July 5–6, 1777 Siege of Fort Ticonderoga
- August 6, 1777 Battle of Oriskany
- August 16, 1777 Battle of Bennington
- September 11, 1777 Battle of Brandywine
- September 19, 1777 Battle of Freeman's Farm
- October 2, 1777 Battle of Germantown
- October 7, 1777 Battle of Bemis Heights
- October 17, 1777 Battle of Saratoga
- May 25, 1778 Battle of Freetown
- June 28, 1778 Battle of Monmouth
- June 30, 1778 Battle of Alligator Bridge
- July 27, 1778 First Battle of Ushant
- August 29, 1778 Battle of Rhode Island
- February 23–25, 1779 Battle of Vincennes
- July 16, 1779 Battle of Stony Point
- July 24 – August 12, 1779 Penobscot Expedition
- August 29, 1779 Battle of Newtown
- October 9, 1779 Siege of Savannah
- January 16, 1780 Battle of Cape St. Vincent
- March 29, 1780 Siege of Charleston
- August 8, 1780 Battle of Piqua
- August 16, 1780 Battle of Camden
- October 7, 1780 Battle of King's Mountain
- January 17, 1781 Battle of Cowpens
- March 15, 1781 Battle of Guilford Court House

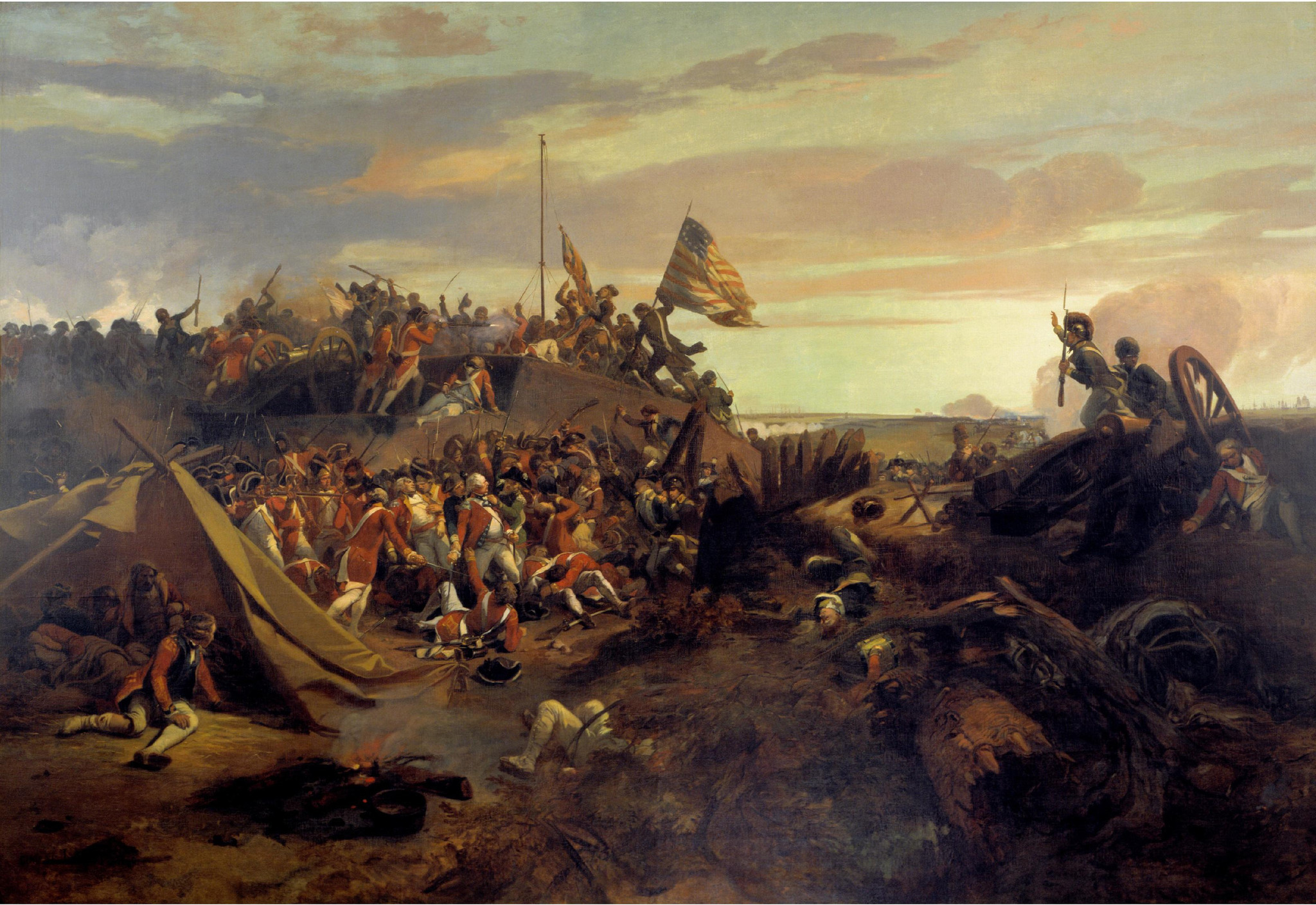
Siege of Yorktown in Yorktown, Virginia was the deciding battle of the American Revolutionary War and among the largest North American Battles of the 18th century. America's independence was recognized in 1783. Painting by Eugene Lami

- September 6, 1781 Battle of Groton Heights
- September 8, 1781 Battle of Eutaw Springs
- September 28 – October 19, 1781 Siege of Yorktown*
- December 12, 1781 Second Battle of Ushant
- February 17, 1782 Battle of Sadras
- April 9–12, 1782 Battle of the Saintes
- August 19, 1782 Battle of Blue Licks

- 1794 Whiskey Rebellion
- Slave Revolts in Spanish Louisiana

- 1791 Mina's Conspiracy
- 1795 Pointe Coupee Conspiracy

==== 19th century ====
This covers all conflicts in the 1800s that occurred between the governments of North America that took place within the modern territory of the United States of America and conflicts between North American and European states. This does not include conflicts regarding Native Americans. *1812–1814 War of 1812

- December 1812,Siege of Detroit
- 1813 Battle of Lake Erie
- 1813 – August 1814 Creek War
- August 24, 1814 Battle of Bladensburg
  - August 24, 1814 Burning of Washington
- November 7–9, 1814 Battle of Pensacola
- December 13, 1814 Action of 13 December 1814 (Louisiana Campaign)
- December 14, 1814 Battle of Lake Borgne
- January 9–18, 1815 Siege of Fort St. Philip
- January 13–14, 1815 Battle of Fort Peter
- Battle of New Orleans - August, 1815
- August 21–23, 1831 Nat Turner's Slave Rebellion

*1835–1836 Texas Revolution

- October 2, 1835 Battle of Gonzales
- October 10, 1835 Battle of Goliad
- November 4, 1835 Battle of Lipantitlán
- October 28, 1835 Battle of Concepción
- November 26, 1835 Grass Fight
- October 12 – December 11, 1835 Siege of Béxar
- February 27, 1836 Battle of San Patricio
- March 2, 1836 Battle of Agua Dulce
- February 23 – March 6, 1836 Battle of the Alamo
- March 12–15, 1836 Battle of Refugio
- March 19–20, 1836 Battle of Coleto
- April 21, 1836 Battle of San Jacinto

- 1838 Missouri Mormon War
- 1844–1846 Illinois Mormon War

*1846–1848 Mexican–American War

- August 13 – September 30, 1846 Siege of Los Angeles

- 1854–1858 Bleeding Kansas
  - 1856 Sacking of Lawrence
  - 1856 Pottawatomie Massacre
- October 29, 1859 John Brown's Raid on Harper's Ferry

*1861–1865 American Civil War

  - February 11–16, 1862 Battle of Fort Donelson
  - April 6–7, 1862 Battle of Shiloh
  - August 28–30, 1862 Second Battle of Bull Run
  - September 17, 1862 Battle of Antietam
  - December 31, 1862 – January 2, 1863 Battle of Stones River
  - April 30 – May 6, 1863 Battle of Chancellorsville
  - July 1–3, 1863 Battle of Gettysburg
  - July 13–16, 1863 New York City draft riots
  - September 19–20, 1863 Battle of Chickamauga
  - May 5–7, 1864 Battle of the Wilderness
  - May 8–21, 1864 Battle of Spotsylvania Court House
  - April 7, 1864 Battle of Appomattox Court House
  - November 15, 1864 - December 21, 1865 Sherman's March to the Sea
  - June 9, 1864 - March 25, 1865 Siege of Petersburg
- 1865–1866 Fenian Raids
- 1878 Lincoln County War
- 1881 Gunfight at the O.K. Corral
- 1887-1894 Hatfield-McCoy Feud
- 1892 Homestead Strike

==== 20th Century ====
This covers all conflicts and terrorist attacks in the 1900s that occurred within the modern territory of the United States of America. This also includes attacks upon the United States from Eurasian powers.

- 1910–1919 Border War
- April 20, 1914 Ludlow Massacre
- 1914–1918 World War I
  - April 21, 1914 Ypiranga incident
  - July 30, 1916 2:08:00 AM (AST; GMT−4) Black Tom explosion
  - January 11, 1917 Kingsland explosion
  - August 2–3, 1917 Green Corn Rebellion
  - July 21, 1918 Attack on Orleans
  - August 7, 1918 Battle of Ambos Nogales
- May 31 – June 1, 1921 Tulsa race massacre
- 1912–1921 West Virginia coal wars
  - September 10–21, 1921 Battle of Blair Mountain
- 1939–1945 World War II

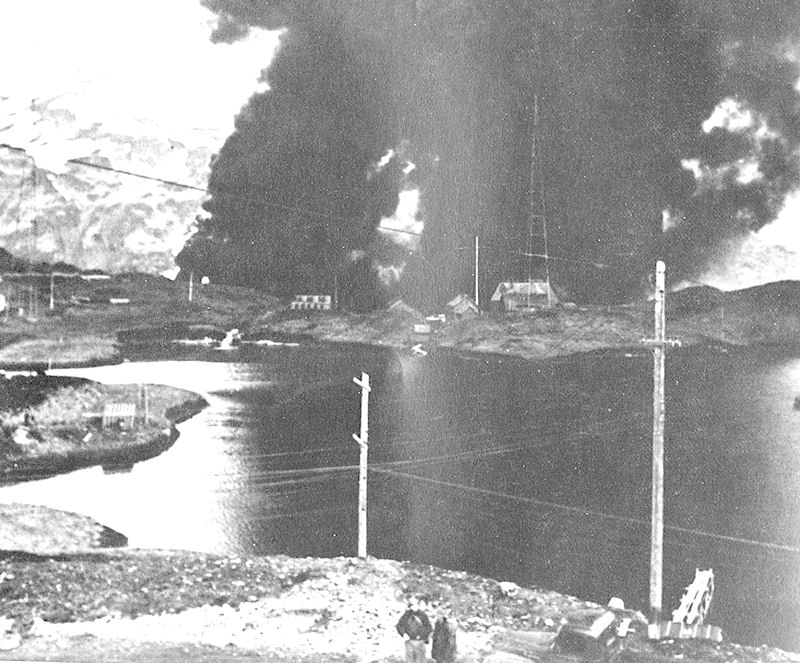
The Navy radio station at Dutch Harbor burning after the Japanese Attack, 4 June 1942 According to Japanese intelligence, the nearest field for land-based American aircraft was at Fort Morrow AAF on Kodiak, more than 600 miles (970 km) away, and Dutch Harbor was a sitting duck for the strong Japanese fleet, carrying out a coordinated operation with a fleet that was to capture Midway Island. The Dutch Harbor attack was part of the Aleutian Islands Campaign.

  - October 16, 1940 – May 21, 1941 Machita Incident
  - December 7, 1941 Attack on Pearl Harbor (Not in North America)
  - February 23, 1942 Bombardment of Ellwood
  - February 24–25, 1942 Battle of Los Angeles
  - June 3, 1942 – August 15, 1943 Battle of the Aleutian Islands
  - June 21, 1942 Bombardment of Fort Stevens
  - July 27, 1942 Lordsburg Killings
  - September 9–29, 1942 Lookout Air Raids
  - May 30, 1943 Zoot Suit Riots
  - August 14, 1944 Fort Lawton Riot
  - March 12, 1945 Santa Fe Riot
  - April 16, – September 17, 1945 Project Hula
  - July 8, 1945 Midnight Massacre
- May 2–4, 1946 Battle of Alcatraz
- August 1–3 Battle of Athens (1946)
- September 30 – October 1 Ole Miss riot of 1962
- August 11–17, 1965 Watts Rebellion
- July 23–27, 1967 1967 Detroit riot
- May 21–25, 1969 Greensboro uprising
- May 4, 1970 Kent State shootings
- September 9, 1971 Attica Prison riot
- May 13, 1985 MOVE bombing in Philadelphia
- April 29, 1992 Los Angeles riots
- August 21–31, 1992 Ruby Ridge standoff
- February 28 – April 19, 1993 Waco siege
- April 11–21, 1993 Lucasville Prison Riot
- April 19, 1995 Oklahoma City bombing
- February 28, 1997 North Hollywood shootout
- March 19 – 20, 1997 Heaven's Gate mass suicide

==== 21st century ====
This includes domestic conflicts and terrorist attacks that took place within the United States. Note that actions of terrorism and domestic conflict are distinguished from one another.

- 2001–2021 war on terrorism

- September 11, 2001 September 11 attacks
- May 8, 2007 Fort Dix attack plot
- November 5, 2009 Fort Hood shooting
- April 15, 2013 Boston Marathon bombing
- April 2, 2014 Fort Hood shootings

- April 5, 2014 - May 2014 Bundy standoff
- January, 1 - February 16, 2016 Occupation of the Malheur National Wildlife Refuge
- June 8, 2020 - July 1, 2020 Capitol Hill Autonomous Zone
- January 6, 2021 United States Capitol Attack
- June 6, June 2025 Los Angeles protests

== Middle America ==
=== Mexico ===
==== Pre-Columbian ====
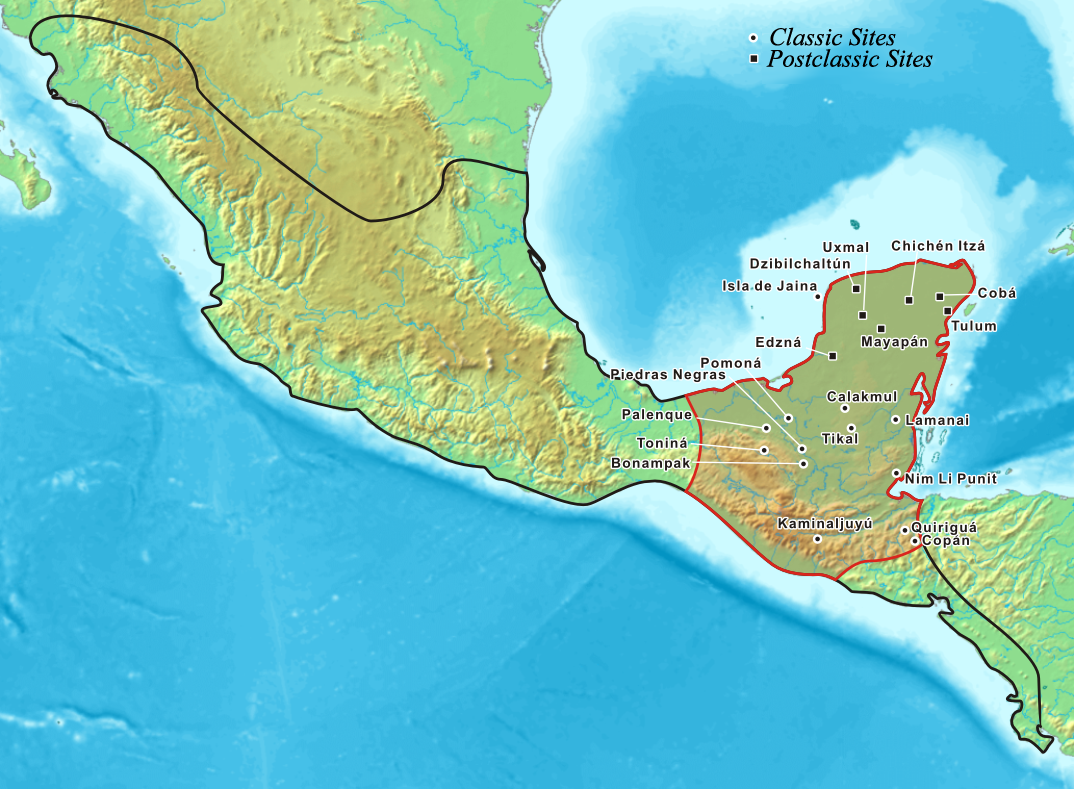
Map depicting the Maya area within the larger Mesoamerican region. View full size for details.

- 537 – 838 Tikal-Calakmul wars
  - 537 – 572 First Tikal-Calakmul War
  - 650 – 695 Second Tikal-Calakmul War
  - 720 – 744 Third Tikal-Calakmul War
- circa 1250–1325 Conflict between the city-states of Tizaapan and Culhuacán ending with the Mexica driven away from Tizaapan to form Tenochtitlan in Lake Texcoco in 1325
- circa 1325–1426 Conflict between the alliance of Tenochtitlan and Azcapotzalco against the city-state of Texcoco, ending in victory for the Tepanec empire
  - 1376–1395 Acamapichtli, the first tlatoani of Tenochtitlan, sent expeditions to fight for Azcapotzalco against various city states, notably Chalco, Cuahnahuac, Xochimilco
  - 1396–1417 Huitzilihuitl, the second tlatoani of Tenochtitlan, assisted in the conquest and sacking of the cities of Tultitlan, Cuauhtitlan, Chalco, Tollantzingo, Xaltocan, Otompa and Acolman
  - 1418 Tezozomoc's war with Ixtlilxochitl I of Texcoco
- 1426 Tepanec Civil War
  - 1427 Maxtla, ruler of Coyoacán incited a rebellion among the nobles of Azcapotzalco and usurped the throne
  - 1427–1440 Allying with Nezahualcoyotl of Texcoco, Itzcoatl went on to defeat Maxtla and end the Tepanec domination of central Mexico
- 1480 – 1510 Saltpeter War
- 1428–1521 Formation and expansion of the Aztec Triple Alliance.
  - 1430–1440 Successful campaigns against Xochimilco, Mixquic, Cuitlahuac, and Tezompa would secure agricultural resources for Tenochtitlan and, along with the conquest of Culhuacan and Coyoacán, would cement the Triple Alliance's control over the southern half of the Valley of Mexico.
  - 1454-1519 Flower war
  - 1440–1458 Reign of Moctezuma I
    - Subjugated the Huastec people and Totonac peoples
    - 1458 Moctezuma I led an expedition into Mixtec territory against the city-state of Coixtlahuaca
    - Campaigns conducted against Cosamaloapan, Ahuilizapan, and Cuetlachtlan
  - 1455 - 1516 Aztec-Tarascan Border Conflict
  - 1473 Axayacatl subjugated Tlatelolco
  - 1481–1486 Tizoc, the seventh tlatoani of Tenochtitlan, put down a rebellion of the Matlatzincan peoples of the Toluca Valley
  - 1486–1502 Ahuizotl began his reign by suppressing a Huastec rebellion, and then conquered the Mixtec and the Zapotec

==== 16th century ====
  - 1502–1520 Through warfare Moctezuma II expanded the territory of the Aztec Empire as far south as Xoconosco in Chiapas and the Isthmus of Tehuantepec, and incorporated the Zapotec and Yopi people into the empire

The maximal extent of the Aztec Empire, according to María del Carmen Solanes Carraro and Enrique Vela Ramírez.

- 1516 Texcoco Civil War
- 1519–1521 Spanish conquest of the Aztec Empire

- The Cholula Massacre of 1519
- Siege of Tenochtitlan (May 26 – August 13, 1521)

- 1527–1546 Spanish conquest of Yucatán
- 1533–1933 Mexican Indian Wars

- 1533 Yaqui Wars
- 1540 Conquest of Cíbola
- 1540 Tiguex War
- 1540–1542 Mixtón War
- 1550–1590 Chichimeca War
- 1599 Acoma Massacre

==== 17th century ====
- 1601 Acaxee Rebellion
- 1616 Tepehuán Revolt
- 1641–1924 Apache–Mexico Wars
- 1641–1864 Navajo Wars
- 1680 Pueblo Revolt

==== 18th century ====
- 1751 Pima Revolt
- 1757 First Magdalena Massacre

==== 19th century ====
- 1821–1870 Comanche–Mexico Wars
- 1847–1901 Caste War of Yucatán

- 1810–1821 Mexican War of Independence
- 1835–1836 Texas Revolution

Development of Spanish American Independence Government under traditional Spanish law Loyal to Supreme Central Junta or Cortes American junta or insurrection movement Independent state declared or established Height of French control of the Peninsula

- 1861–1867 French intervention in Mexico

==== 20th century ====
- 1910–1921 Mexican Revolution
- 1926–1929 Cristero War
- 1958–1959 Mexico–Guatemala conflict
- 1964–1982 Mexican Dirty War
  - 1968 Mexican Movement of 1968
  - 1968 Tlatelolco massacre
  - 1971 El Halconazo
- 1994–late 2010s Chiapas conflict
  - 1994 Zapatista uprising
  - 1995 1995 Zapatista Crisis
  - 2005–2006 The Other Campaign

==== 21st century ====
- 1992–present War on drugs

- December 11, 2006–present Mexican drug war

- December 11, 2006–present Operation Michoacán
- January 2, 2007–present Operation Baja California
- 2008–present Operation Sinaloa
- 2007–present Joint Operation Nuevo León-Tamaulipas

- November 5, 2010 Shootout at Matamoros, 50–100 killed
- August 24, 2010 San Fernando massacre
- April 6, 2011 – June 7, 2011 San Fernando massacre
- August 25, 2011 Monterrey casino attack
- June 25, 2010 Nuevo León mass graves

- 2008–present Operation Chihuahua
- February 2009 – present Operation Quintana Roo
- July 16, 2011 – August 4, 2011 Operación Lince Norte
- June 3, 2011 Coahuila mass graves
- August 28, 2011 – October 31, 2011 Operación Escorpión

- 2011 – present Infighting in the Gulf Cartel
- 2012 – present Infighting in Los Zetas
- 2011 – present Mexican Indignados Movement
- 2017 2017 Mexican protests
- 2024 – present Infighting in the Sinaloa Cartel

=== Central America ===
==== Guatemala ====
- 378 A war of conquest: Tikal against Uaxactun
- 1524–1697 Spanish conquest of Guatemala

Date	Event	Modern department
February – March 1524	Spanish defeat the K'iche'	Retalhuleu, Suchitepéquez, Quetzaltenango, Totonicapán and El Quiché
8 February 1524	Battle of Zapotitlán, Spanish victory over the K'iche'	Suchitepéquez
12 February 1524	First battle of Quetzaltenango results in the death of the K'iche' lord Tecun Uman	Quetzaltenango
18 February 1524	Second battle of Quetzaltenango	Quetzaltenango
March 1524	Spanish under Pedro de Alvarado raze Q'umarkaj, capital of the K'iche'	El Quiché
14 April 1524	Spanish enter Iximche and ally themselves with the Kaqchikel	Chimaltenango
18 April 1524	Spanish defeat the Tz'utujil in battle on the shores of Lake Atitlán	Sololá
9 May 1524	Pedro de Alvarado defeats the Pipil of Panacal or Panacaltepeque near Izcuintepeque	Escuintla
26 May 1524	Pedro de Alvarado defeats the Xinca of Atiquipaque	Santa Rosa
27 July 1524	Iximche declared first colonial capital of Guatemala	Chimaltenango
28 August 1524	Kaqchikel abandon Iximche and break alliance	Chimaltenango
7 September 1524	Spanish declare war on the Kaqchikel	Chimaltenango
1525	The Poqomam capital falls to Pedro de Alvarado	Guatemala
13 March 1525	Hernán Cortés arrives at Lake Petén Itzá	Petén
October 1525	Zaculeu, capital of the Mam, surrenders to Gonzalo de Alvarado y Contreras after a lengthy siege	Huehuetenango
1526	Chajoma rebel against the Spanish	Guatemala
1526	Acasaguastlán given in encomienda to Diego Salvatierra	El Progreso
1526	Spanish captains sent by Alvarado conquer Chiquimula	Chiquimula
9 February 1526	Spanish deserters burn Iximche	Chimaltenango
1527	Spanish abandon their capital at Tecpán Guatemala	Chimaltenango
1529	San Mateo Ixtatán given in encomienda to Gonzalo de Ovalle	Huehuetenango
September 1529	Spanish routed at Uspantán	El Quiché
April 1530	Rebellion in Chiquimula put down	Chiquimula
9 May 1530	Kaqchikel surrender to the Spanish	Sacatepéquez
December 1530	Ixil and Uspantek surrender to the Spanish	El Quiché
April 1533	Juan de León y Cardona founds San Marcos and San Pedro Sacatepéquez	San Marcos
1543	Foundation of Cobán	Alta Verapaz
1549	First reductions of the Chuj and Q'anjob'al	Huehuetenango
1551	Corregimiento of San Cristóbal Acasaguastlán established	El Progreso, Zacapa and Baja Verapaz
1555	Lowland Maya kill Francisco de Vico	Alta Verapaz
1560	Reduction of Topiltepeque and Lakandon Ch'ol	Alta Verapaz
1618	Franciscan missionaries arrive at Nojpetén, capital of the Itzá	Petén
1619	Further missionary expeditions to Nojpetén	Petén
1684	Reduction of San Mateo Ixtatán and Santa Eulalia	Huehuetenango
29 January 1686	Melchor Rodríguez Mazariegos leaves Huehuetenango, leading an expedition against the Lacandón	Huehuetenango
1695	Franciscan friar Andrés de Avendaño attempts to convert the Itzá	Petén
28 February 1695	Spanish expeditions leave simultaneously from Cobán, San Mateo Ixtatán and Ocosingo against the Lacandón	Alta Verapaz, Huehuetenango and Chiapas
1696	Andrés de Avendaño forced to flee Nojpetén	Petén
13 March 1697	Nojpetén falls to the Spanish after a fierce battle	Petén

- 1530 Alvarado enslaves the Mayan kingdoms of Cakchiquel, Mam, and Ixil.
- 1533–1933 Mexican Indian Wars
- 1811 1811 Independence Movement
- 1823–1838 Federal Republic of Central America Independence and annexation by the Mexican Empire
- 1896–1898 Greater Republic of Central America
- 1954 1954 Guatemalan coup d'état
- 1958–1959 Mexico–Guatemala conflict
- 1960–1996 Central American crisis
  - 1960–1996 Guatemalan Civil War
- 1993 1993 Guatemalan constitutional crisis
- 2015 2015 Guatemalan protests
- 2020 2020 Guatemalan protests

==== Nicaragua ====
- 1898–1934 Banana Wars
  - September 19, 1912 Battle of Masaya
  - October 3–4, 1912 Battle of Coyotepe Hill
  - May 16, 1927 Battle of La Paz Centro
  - July 16, 1927 Battle of Ocotal
  - July 25, 1927 Battle of San Fernando
  - July 27, 1927 Battle of Santa Clara
  - September 19, 1927 Battle of Telpaneca
  - October 9, 1927 Battle of Sapotillal
  - January 1, 1928 Battle of Las Cruces
  - February 27–28, 1928 Battle of El Bramadero
  - May 13–14, 1928 Battle of La Flor
  - December 31, 1930 Battle of Achuapa
  - September 16, 1932 Battle of Agua Carta
  - December 26, 1932 Battle of El Sauce
- 1926–1927 Nicaraguan civil war
- 1960–1996 Central American crisis
  - 1961–1990 Nicaraguan Revolution
  - 1988 Operation Golden Pheasant
- 2014–present 2014–2020 Nicaraguan protests
  - 2018–present 2018–2021 Nicaraguan protests
    - 2018 April 19 University Movement

==== Costa Rica ====
- March 12 – April 24, 1948 Costa Rican Civil War
- January 1958 Calderonista invasion of Costa Rica
- 2018 2018 Costa Rican protests

==== El Salvador ====
- 1533–1933 Mexican Indian Wars
- 1969 Football War
- 1960–1996 Central American crisis
  - 1972 1972 Salvadoran coup d'état attempt
  - 1979–1992 Salvadoran Civil War
    - October 15, 1979 1979 Salvadoran coup d'état
    - January 10–26, 1981 Final offensive of 1981 (El Salvador)
      - January 1981 Battle of Ilopango Airport
    - November 11–12, 1989 Final offensive of 1989
- 2020 2020 Salvadoran political crisis
- 2021 2021 Salvadoran political crisis
- 2022–present Salvadoran gang crackdown

==== Honduras ====
- 1533–1933 Mexican Indian Wars
- 1963 1963 Honduran coup d'état
- 1960–1996 Central American crisis
  - 1969 Football War
  - 1988 Operation Golden Pheasant
- 2009 2009 Honduran coup d'état
- 2017–2018 2017–2018 Honduran protests
- 2019 2019 Honduran protests
- 2022–present Honduran gang crackdown

==== Panama ====
- 1960 — 1996 Central American crisis
  - 1968 — 1971 Insurgency in Chiriquí
  - 1989 — 1990 United States invasion of Panama
    - December 20, 1989 Capture of Torrijos Airport
    - December 20, 1989 Operation Acid Gambit
    - December 20, 1989 Raid at Renacer Prison
    - December 20, 1989 Battle of Rio Hato Airfield
    - December 20, 1989 Battle of Paitilla Airport
    - December 20–23, 1989 Operation Nifty Package

==== Belize ====
- 1533–1933 Mexican Indian Wars
- 1981 Heads of Agreement Crisis

== Caribbean ==
All conflicts which occurred on the islands in the Caribbean Sea are listed here. US Territories such as Puerto Rico and the US Virgin Islands are exceptions to this rule as they included in the United States' Section.

=== Dominican Republic ===
- 1519–1533 Enriquillo rebelled against the Spaniards
- December 25, 1521 Santo Domingo Slave Revolt
- 1532–1547 Maroon rebellion of Sebastian Lemba
- 1585–1604 Anglo-Spanish War
  - January 1, 1586 Battle of Santo Domingo
- 1688–1697 Nine Years' War
  - January 21, 1691 Battle of Sabana Real
- 1795–1809 French occupation of Santo Domingo
  - 1796 1796 Boca de Nigua slave revolt
  - 1808–1809 Spanish reconquest of Santo Domingo
- 1809–1821 España Boba
  - 1812 1812 Mendoza and Mojarra Conspiracy
- December 1, 1821 Independence of Republic of Spanish Haiti
- 1822–1844 Haitian occupation of Santo Domingo
- 1844–1856 Dominican War of Independence
- 1857–1858 Cibaeño Revolution
- 1861–1865 Spanish annexation of the Dominican Republic
  - 1863–1865 Dominican Restoration War
- 1868–1874 Six Years' War
  - 1869–1871 Proposed United States annexation of Santo Domingo
- February 1–11, 1904 Santo Domingo Affair
- 1916–1924 United States occupation of the Dominican Republic
- 1965–1966 Dominican Civil War
  - 1965 Battle of Duarte Bridge

=== Cuba ===
- 1524–1530 Guamá led a rebellion against Spanish rule in Cuba
- 1568–1648 Eighty Years' War
  - September 7–8, 1628 Battle in the Bay of Matanzas
- October 10, 1868 – 1878 Ten Years' War
- April 25 – August 12, 1898 Spanish–American War
  - April 25, 1898 Action of 25 April 1898
  - May 8, 1898 First Battle of Cárdenas
  - May 11, 1898 Battle of Cárdenas
  - May 11, 1898 Battle of Cienfuegos
  - June 6–10, 1898 Battle of Guantánamo Bay
  - June 13, 1898 Action of 13 June 1898
  - June 24, 1898 Battle of Las Guasimas
  - June 30, 1898 First Battle of Manzanillo
  - June 30, 1898 Battle of Tayacoba
  - July 1, 1898 Battle of the Aguadores
  - July 1, 1898 Battle of El Caney
  - July 1, 1898 Battle of San Juan Hill
  - July 1, 1898 Second Battle of Manzanillo
  - July 3, 1898 Battle of Santiago de Cuba
  - July 3–17, 1898 Siege of Santiago
  - July 18, 1898 Third Battle of Manzanillo
  - July 21, 1898 Battle of Nipe Bay
  - July 23, 1898 Battle of Rio Manimani
- 1898–1934 Banana Wars
- 1906–1909 United States occupation of Cuba
- 1912 Negro Rebellion
- 1917–1922 Sugar Intervention
- 1953 1952 Cuban coup d'état
- 1953–1959 Cuban Revolutionary War
  - July 26, 1953 Attack on Moncada Barracks
  - March 13, 1957 Havana Presidential Palace attack (1957)
  - May 28, 1957 Attack on El Uvero
  - June 28 – August 8, 1958 Operation Verano
    - July 11–21, 1958 Battle of La Plata
    - July 29 – August 8, 1958 Battle of Las Mercedes
  - November 20, 1958 Battle of Guisa
  - December 19–30, 1958 Battle of Yaguajay
  - December 28, 1958 – January 1, 1959 Battle of Santa Clara
- 1959-1965 Escambray Rebellion
- April 17–19, 1961 Bay of Pigs Invasion
- October 16–29, 1962 Cuban Missile Crisis
- 1994 Maleconazo
- 2021 – present 2021 Cuban protests

=== Saint Martin ===
- 1568–1648 Eighty Years' War
  - June 1633 Capture of Saint Martin
  - 1644 Attack on Saint Martin

=== Tobago ===
- 1672–1678 Franco-Dutch War
  - March 1677 Action of March 1677
- 1970 Black Power Revolution
- 1990 Jamaat al Muslimeen coup attempt

=== Haiti ===
- April 20, 1792 – March 25, 1802 French Revolutionary Wars
  - 1791–1804 Haitian Revolution
    - 1799-1800 War of the South
    - 1802 Battle of Ravine-à-Couleuvres
    - 4–24 March 1802 Battle of Crête-à-Pierrot
    - November 18, 1803 Battle of Vertières

Political evolution of Central America and the Caribbean

- July 28, 1915 – August 1, 1934 United States occupation of Haiti

- October 24–25, 1915 Battle of Fort Dipitie
- November 17, 1915 Battle of Fort Rivière
- October 6 or 7, 1919 Battle of Port-au-Prince (1919)
- January 15, 1920 Battle of Port-au-Prince (1920)

- October 1937 Parsley Massacre
- 1991 1991 Haitian coup d'etat
- 1994–1995 Operation Uphold Democracy
- 2004 2004 Haitian coup d'état
- 2018 – present 2018–2021 Haitian protests
- 2020 – present Gang war in Haiti
  - 2026– present Salvadoran military intervention in Haiti

=== Jamaica ===
- 1654–1660 Anglo-Spanish War
  - May 19–27, 1655 Invasion of Jamaica
- 1934–1939 British West Indian labour unrest
- 1943–present Jamaican political conflict
  - 2010 2010 Kingston unrest

=== Grenada ===
- 1973–1983 New Jewel Movement
  - 1983 Invasion of Grenada

=== Anguilla ===
- 1969 Operation Sheepskin

== See also ==
- Colonization of the Americas
- List of conflicts in Africa
- List of conflicts in Asia
- List of conflicts in Central America
- List of conflicts in Europe
- List of conflicts in South America
- List of conflicts in the Middle East
- List of conflicts in the Near East
- List of riots and civil unrest in Calgary
- List of wars
- Military history of Mexico
- Military history of North America
