= Military history of North America =

The military history of North America can be viewed in a number of phases.

== Pre-European contact ==
Prior to the voyages of Christopher Columbus, warfare and conquest occurred from time to time between the indigenous peoples of the Americas. Examples of early indigenous conflicts include Tikal-Calakmul wars in the Yucatán. In central Mexico, the Aztec Empire fought their enemies in intermittent ritual wars known as the Flower war.

== 16th century–1775 ==
Following Christopher Columbus's establishment of permanent settlements in the Caribbean, the Spanish authorized expeditions for the discovery, conquest, and colonization of new territory. In 1519, Spanish conquistadors waged a military campaign against the Aztec Empire. The campaign culminated in the fall of Tenochtitlan, after a coalition force made up of conquistadors and indigenous tribes that rivaled the Aztecs, captured the city. Subsequent campaigns of conquest were undertaken by Spanish in the Yucatán, and Guatemala. Indigenous resistance and conflicts against the authorities of the Viceroyalty of New Spain (present-day Central America and Mexico), and its succeeding governments continued to occur intermittently. These wars are collectively referred to as the Mexican Indian Wars.

European colonization in Northern America (present-day Canada and the United States) saw conflicts between European colonizers and the indigenous peoples of Northern America. These series of conflicts and wars are collectively referred to as the American Indian Wars. In the Great Lakes region of Northern America, the period of early European contact saw indigenous conflicts between the members of the Haudenosaunee Confederacy, with the support of their English and Dutch allies, against various indigenous groups, including the Wendat Confederacy, the Illinois Confederation, and Wabanaki Confederacy, all of whom were supported by their French allies. This indigenous conflict, collectively referred to as the Beaver Wars, was fought primarily over control of the North American fur trade.

In addition to these conflicts, European nations also used their North American colonial possessions to wage wars with one other colonial territories in the event of a larger war in Europe or for the control of resources. A number of colonial territories saw conflict with rival colonies as a result of a larger European war. Several North American colonies were attacked by other European powers in conflicts such as the Anglo-Spanish War of 1585 to 1604, and the Eighty Years' War. Campaigns of colonial conquest were also fought during this time, with the Dutch conquest of New Sweden during the Second Northern War, and the English conquest of New Netherland during the Second Anglo-Dutch War. By the beginning of the 18th century, the kingdoms of England, France, and Spain were the only remaining colonial powers on the North American mainland.

From 1689 to 1763, a series of conflicts between the English/British and the French took place, which saw the two European powers fight a number of wars, spanning a number of continents, including North America. During this period, the colonial powers fought over control of the colonies of British America and New France. The North American portion of the British-French struggle culminated in the Seven Years' War, referred to as the French and Indian War in the United States. The war secured British predominance in Northern America, and saw the end of French-rule in New France. At the war's conclusion, the French were forced to cede all its possessions east of the Mississippi River and Canada to the British; as well as cede its Louisiana territory to the Spanish. The Spanish in turn, ceded Spanish Florida to the British.

== 1775–1900 ==
The beginning of the next phase was marked by the American Revolutionary War in 1775, an independence war where the Thirteen Colonies, and its European allies, fought against Great Britain. Following the independence of the United States, several internal conflicts erupted in the new country including Shays' Rebellion, and the Whiskey Rebellion.

Although the French Revolutionary and Napoleonic Wars were largely confined to Europe, the North American continent also saw some action between its belligerents. In the early years of the French Revolution, a successful slave revolt broke out in the French colony of Saint-Domingue. With assistance from the British, the Haitian Revolution eventually saw the independence of the Empire of Haiti. A direct consequence of the Haitian Revolution was the French invasion of Santo Domingo, a neighbouring Spanish colony in 1801. The West Indies campaign from 1804 to 1810 saw the Spanish and British reconquest of Santo Domingo's in 1808. In addition, the British invaded several French colonies in the West Indies, including Guadeloupe, and Martinique.

In addition to these campaigns, the French Revolutionary and Napoleonic Wars was a contributing factor for a number of other conflicts on the continent. From 1798 to 1800, the United States and the French First Republic fought an undeclared war over debt-repayments, known as the Quasi-War. The Napoleonic Wars was also a contributing factor towards the War of 1812, a conflict in Northern America fought between the United States, and the United Kingdom, along with their remaining colonies in British North America, particularly the Canadas. Napoleon's invasion of Iberia also led to the eventual independence of New Spain in the Mexican War of Independence. The turmoil caused by Napoleon's invasion of Spain also led to the peaceful independence of the colony of Santo Domingo in 1821. However, it was quickly annexed by Haiti in 1822. Their independence was reestablished following the Dominican War of Independence. After a period of Spanish re-colonization, the independence of the Dominican Republic was reasserted in the Dominican Restoration War.

The mid-19th century saw a number of conflicts, including the Mexican–American War; and two French interventions in Mexico, the first from 1838 to 1839, and the second from 1861 to 1866. The end of the century saw the expulsion of the Spanish from their last major territories on the continent during the Spanish–American War.

Internal conflict was also an issue in this period. The colonial and Dominion governments of the Canadas saw several rebellions including the Rebellions of 1837, and the North-West Rebellion. The Mexican government faced a war of secession in Mexican Texas (the Texas Revolution), as well as internal civil conflict (such as the Reform War).

Slavery was a major point of contention in the United States for the first-half of the 19th century. During that period, the United States saw several slave revolts, including German Coast Uprising in 1811, Nat Turner's slave rebellion in 1831, the 1842 Slave Revolt in the Cherokee Nation, and John Brown raid in 1859. The long-standing controversy regarding slavery eventually led to the American Civil War. Lasting from 1861 to 1865, the war saw the collapse of the Confederate States of America, as well as the abolition of slavery in the United States. Other slave revolts in North America includes Bussa's rebellion in Barbados. Bussa's revolt in 1816 was an example of a Caribbean slave revolt during the period. In addition to these internal conflicts, intermittent indigenous conflicts continued to persist in the 19th century.

== 1900–present ==
Following the Spanish–American War, military operations on the North American continent were largely confined to American occupations, police actions, and interventions in Central America and the Caribbean. These military interventions, collectively referred to as the Banana Wars, were conducted to maintain American economic interests in the area. The series of conflicts ended in 1934, with their withdrawal from Haiti, and the adoption of Good Neighbor policy by American President Franklin Roosevelt. During the early-20th century, the two intermittent indigenous conflicts that began in the 16th century came to an end. The last skirmish of the American Indian Wars was in 1924, when the last Apache raid in the United States took place. The last skirmish of the Mexican Indian War was in 1933, between the Mexican government, and the Maya people of the Yucatán.

The first half of the 20th century saw two significant civil conflicts in Mexico. The Mexican Revolution, from 1910 to 1919, saw a series of successive political rebellions against the government of Mexico. The conflict resulted in the creation of the 1917 Constitution of Mexico. The Cristero War, from 1926 to 1929, was a widespread rebellion against the secularist, anti-Catholic and anti-clerical policies of the incumbent Mexican government. The conflict came to an end following an American-brokered ceasefire in 1929.

During World War II, the North American theatre was a minor area of the conflict, although several isolated attacks on the North American coast were carried out by the Empire of Japan, and Nazi Germany. From 1942 to 1943, American and Canadian forces were engaged in the Aleutian Islands Campaign, where they defended the Alaska Territory against Japanese incursion. On the eastern side of the continent, the Battle of the St. Lawrence was an anti-submarine campaign between Canada and Germany. The Battle of the St. Lawrence is considered to be a part of the larger Battle of the Atlantic, where Allied navies aimed to protect the North Atlantic convoys from German U-boats.

=== Cold War ===
Following the Second World War, most countries in the Americas, including every country in Central America, Mexico, and the United States, signed the Inter-American Treaty of Reciprocal Assistance in 1947, a treaty that committed its signors to the doctrine of hemispheric defence. A similar treaty of collective defence between Canada and the United States was arranged through NATO. In April 1948, the Organization of American States was created during the Ninth International Conference of American States held in Bogotá, with member states pledging to fight communism on the American continent.

The Truman administration supported the National Liberation Party of Costa Rica during the 1948 Costa Rican Civil War, as a result of their opposition to the communist government.

In 1953, the first successful communist revolution occurred in the Americas, with the Cuban Revolution. A US-sponsored counter-revolutionary invasion was repelled in 1961 during the Bay of Pigs Invasion. The discovery of Soviet missiles in Cuba in 1963 led to a standoff between the United States, and Cuba and the Soviet Union, known as the Cuban Missile Crisis. The crisis escalated to the point where a United States Navy quarantined Cuba. The crisis was eventually resolved when the Khrushchev regime agreed to withdraw their missiles from the island, in exchange for the withdrawal of US missiles in Turkey, and Italy; as well as an agreement that the United States would not invade Cuba without direct provocation. The Escambray rebellion was another counter-revolutionary rebellion in the Escambray Mountains of Cuba. Lasting for six years (1959–65).

Throughout the Cold War-era, the United States, along with its allies in the Americas, staged military interventions in several countries in North America, in an effort to contain communism. Military interventions of this nature include the Dominican Civil War in 1963, and the invasion of Grenada in 1983. As the Central American crisis unraveled in the late 1970s, several Central American states including El Salvador, Guatemala, and Nicaragua, saw civil wars and pro-communist revolutions erupt in their country. Various factions involved in those conflicts saw support from either the United States, or the Eastern Bloc, as the civil conflicts became proxies of the larger Cold War.

In July 1969, the countries of El Salvador and Honduras fought a brief war known as the Football War.

=== Post-Cold War-era ===
The Zapatista uprising of 1994 was a rebellion in Chiapas, Mexico, coordinated by the Zapatista Army of National Liberation. Launched in response to the implementation of the North American Free Trade Agreement, the rebellion resulted in the San Andrés Accords, granting a number of rights, autonomy, and recognition for the indigenous population of Chiapas. Low-level skirmishes and violent incidents relating to the Zapatista uprising persisted in Chiapas.

== See also ==
- History of North America
- List of conflicts in North America
- Military history of Africa
- Military history of Asia
- Military history of Europe
- Military history of Oceania
- Military history of South America
