= Gerardo Clemente Vega =

Mexican General (1940–2022)

Gerardo Clemente Vega Garcia
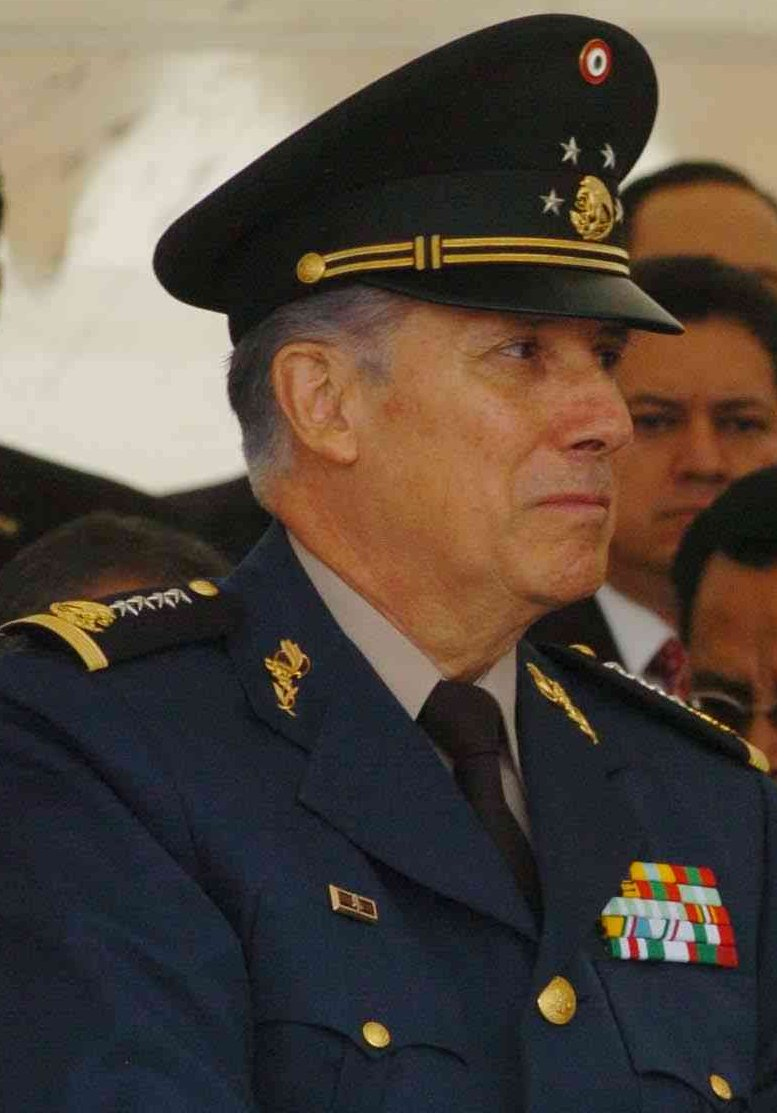

Secretary of National Defense
- In office 1 December 2000 – 30 November 2006
- President: Vicente Fox
- Preceded by: Enrique Cervantes Aguirre
- Succeeded by: Guillermo Galván Galván

Personal details
- Born: 28 March 1940 Puebla de Zaragoza, Puebla, Mexico
- Died: 22 June 2022 (aged 82) Mérida, Yucatán, Mexico
- Profession: Soldier

Gerardo Clemente R. Vega García (28 March 1940 – 22 June 2022) was a Mexican general who served from 2000 to 2006 as Minister of Defense.

== Biography ==
Vega studied at the Heróico Colegio Militar., he received a bachelor's degree in administration from the Escuela Superior de Guerra and a master's degree in security and national defense from the Colegio de la Defensa Nacional. He was a professor of the Heróico Colegio Militar and of the Escuela Superior de Guerra and served as Director of the Colegio de la Defensa Nacional and Rector of the Universidad del Ejército y la Fuerza Aérea.

== Career and education ==
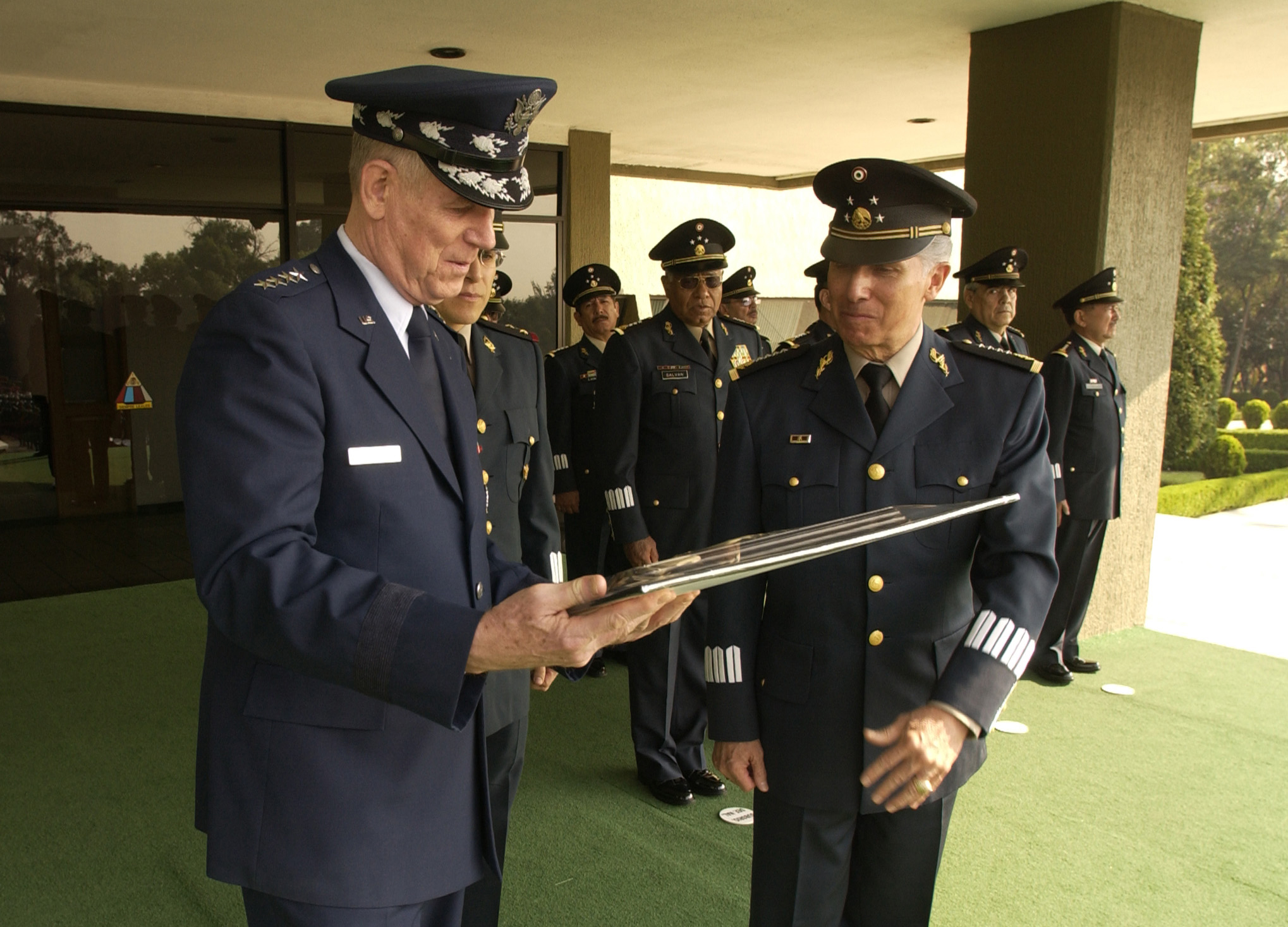
Gen. Gerardo Vega with U.S. Chairman of the Joint Chiefs of Staff Gen. Richard B. Myers.

Vega held different positions in the Mexican army. As Captain he served in the 13/o Batallón de Infantería in Veracruz and in the 15/o Regimiento de Caballería in Guanajuato. As Major he served in Mérida, Villahermosa, Chihuahua and Quintana Roo.

He also served as the Mexican military attaché in the former Soviet Union, Poland, and West Germany.

In 2000 President Vicente Fox designated him Minister of Defense.

Preceded by Enrique Cervantes Aguirre	Secretary of the National Defense; 2000–2006	Succeeded by Guillermo Galván Galván
