= Nicolas d'Ailleboust de Manthet =

Canadian military officer (1664–1709)

- Born: August 25, 1664; Ville-Marie, Canada
- Died: 1709; Fort Albany, Hudson Bay
- Other name: Nicolas de Manthet
- Spouse(s): Françoise-Jeanne Denis (1664 - 1738), 1696
- Military career
- Allegiance: (Kingdom of France) France
- Branch: Compagnies Franches de la Marine
- Rank: Captain
- Conflicts: King William's War: Schenectady massacre 1690; Mohawk Valley raid 1692; Queen Anne's War: Battle of Fort Albany 1709 †

Nicolas d'Ailleboust de Manthet, also known as Nicolas de Manthet, born 1664, killed in action 1709, was a Canadian captain in the French marines serving in Canada. He was one of the leaders of the French and Indians at the Schenectady massacre 1690.

== Military career ==
De Manthet fought in many battles during his military career. In 1689 he participated in an attack against the Senecas at the Lake of Two Mountains, thereby saving that years fur trade from capture. Together with Jacques le Moyne de Sainte-Hélène he led 114 Canadians and 96 allied Indians in the attack on Schenectady in 1690. He also participated in the raid against the Mohawk towns in 1692. It was when leading an attack against Fort Albany at the Hudson Bay that he was killed in action.
