= Guillermo Galván Galván =

Mexican general (born 1943)

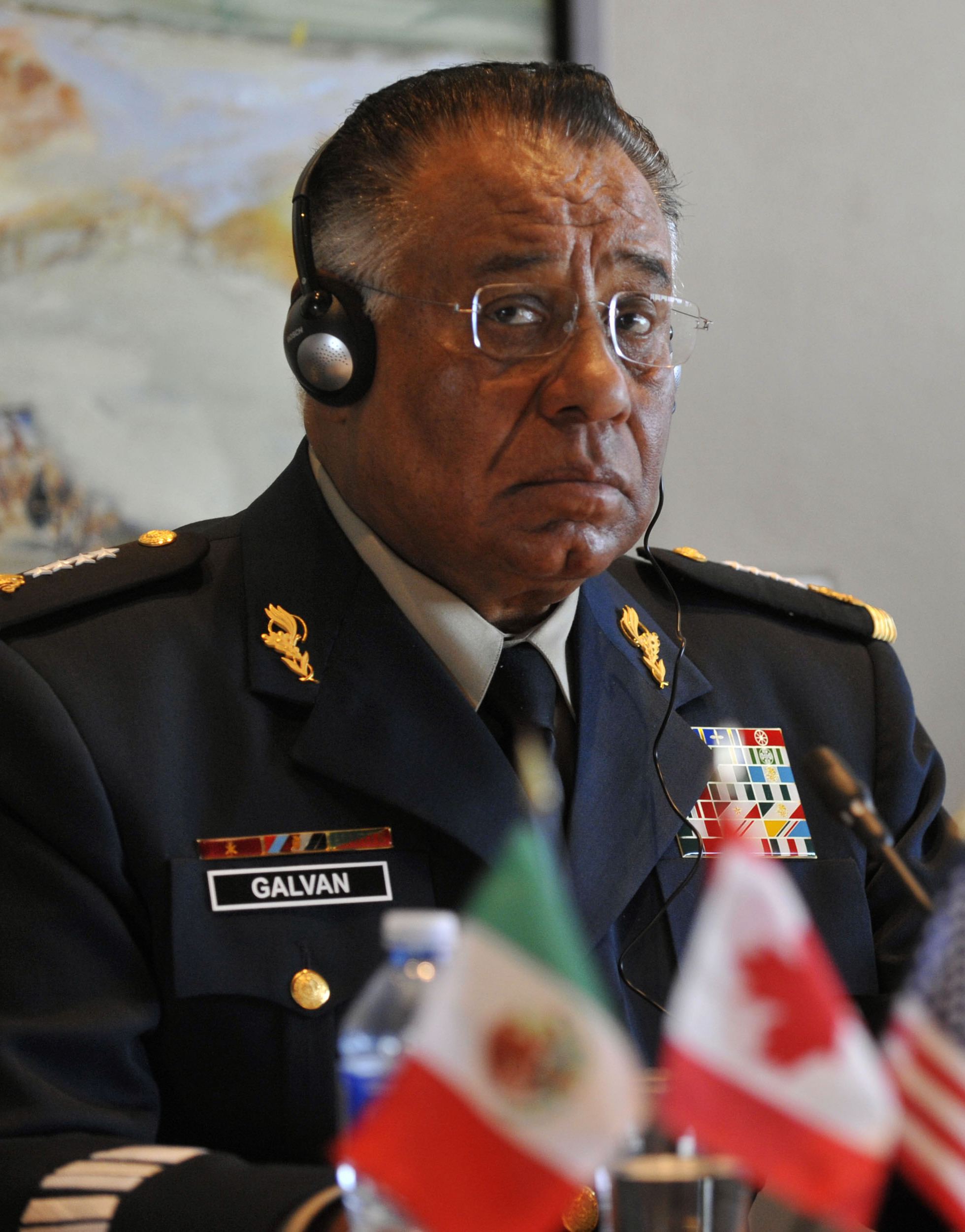
- Galván in 2012

Secretary of National Defense
- In office 1 December 2006 – 30 November 2012
- President: Felipe Calderón
- Preceded by: Gerardo Clemente Vega
- Succeeded by: Salvador Cienfuegos

Personal details
- Born: 19 January 1943 (age 83) Mexico City, Mexico
- Spouse: Josefina Alvarez de la Sierra
- Education: Heroic Military College

Military service
- Allegiance: Mexico
- Branch/service: Mexican Army
- Years of service: 1959–2012
- Rank: Division general
- Battles/wars: Mexican drug war: Operación Lince Norte; Operación Escorpión
- Awards: Mexican Legion of Honor; Legion of Merit

Guillermo Galván Galván (born January 19, 1943) is a Mexican general. He formerly served as secretary of National Defense for the government of Felipe Calderon. He was succeeded 1 December 2012 by Salvador Cienfuegos Zepeda.

He completed an MA (security and national defense) at the College of National Defense, a BA (military administration) at the School of War and an MA (electronic engineering) at the Monterrey Institute of Technology and Higher Education.

Galván served as military and air defense attaché at the Mexican embassy in Madrid, Spain. He served as commander of various military zones in the country, including the fifth zone in the state of Chihuahua, the 30th in Tabasco, the 21st in Tabasco and the 17th in Querétaro. Galván has served as assistant operating staff director, as head of the Center for the Coordination of Air Operations of the National Defense Staff, and head of the Fifth Section of the National Defense Staff. The general also was director and dean of the University of the Mexican Army and Air Force in the Federal District and director of the Military School of Weapons Classes in the state of Puebla. Galván served as undersecretary of National Defense from March 2004 until his appointment as National Defense Secretary.

== See also ==
- Mexican Executive Cabinet
