= Operación Escorpión =

Mexican Army drug war initiative

- Part of Mexican drug war
Date	August 28, 2011 – October 31, 2011
Location	Tamaulipas, Nuevo León, Coahuila and San Luis Potosí, Mexico
Result	Mexican Army victory

Belligerents
Mexican Army	Gulf Cartel; Los Zetas Cartel

Commanders and leaders
Felipe Calderón; Guillermo Galván Galván	Miguel Treviño Morales (POW); Heriberto Lazcano Lazcano †

Strength
1,500 soldiers	Unknown

Casualties and losses
2 killed 18 wounded	112 killed 1,093 arrested

Operación Escorpión (Operation Scorpion), was a military operation conducted by the Mexican Secretariat of National Defense, from August 28 to October 31, 2011, in the states of Coahuila, Nuevo León, Tamaulipas and San Luis Potosí. The prime objective was to weaken the Zetas and Gulf cartels. During the operation, 75 attacks from the criminals were prevented and repelled.

== Seized assets and achievements ==
- 130 kidnapped persons freed
- 1,093 criminals arrested
- 50032.64 kg of marijuana
- 18.765 doses of marijuana
- 26.256 kg cocaine
- 12.417 doses of cocaine
- 4,286 kg of crack cocaine
- 40.553 doses of crack
- $11'720,642 Mexican pesos
- $910,000 United States dollars
- 735.843 liters of fuel
- 34 Tons of steel
- 3,099 firearms
- 14,272 magazines
- 381.706 cartridges of various calibres
- 345 grenades
- 28 grenade launchers
- 7 antitank weapons
- 4 rockets
- 40 motorcycles
- 49 different types of trailers
- 9 boats
- 1,355 vehicles (62 of them armored)
- Tactical equipment
- Uniforms
- Body armor
- Tactical load carrying suspenders
- Communications equipment
- 53 pirate taxis
- More than 3,000 auto parts (reported as stolen)
- 27 illegal casinos were closed
- 22 "dark trades" were closed (legal businesses working as fronts for illegal drug trade and brothels)
- 492 corrupt policemen arrested
- 175 suspicious policemen detained
- 112 attackers killed
- 75 attacks repelled

== Operation casualties ==
- 2 soldiers killed in action
- 18 soldiers injured in the line of duty
