= Capture of Torrijos Airport =

- Part of the United States invasion of Panama
- Capture of Torrijos Airport (Panama)
Date	20 December 1989; 36 years ago
Location	Omar Torrijos International Airport, Panama City, Panama
Result	American victory: Capture of Panamanian Air Force

Belligerents
United States	Panama

Commanders and leaders
(United States) Robert W. Wagner	(Panama) Unknown

Units involved
75th Ranger Regiment: 1st Ranger Battalion; 3rd Ranger Battalion; Company C	Panama Defense Forces: 2nd PDF Company

Strength
Unknown; 4 C-130; 1 AC-130 gunship AH-6 helicopters	200; 1 ZPU-4

Casualties and losses
1 killed 5 wounded	5 killed 50 captured 398 civilians detained

The Capture of Torrijos Airport took place as an opening action of the United States invasion of Panama, and was fought between the U.S. military and the Panama Defense Forces (PDF) on 20 December 1989. The goal of this operation was to capture the Panamanian Air Force, headquartered at the airport, and to close the airport to traffic coming into Panama.

The capture of Torrijos Airport was executed by the U.S. Army Rangers of the 75th Ranger Regiment.

== Background ==
The US had developed a three-stage plan to capture Torrijos Airport to the mission: to isolate Objective Bear (the main terminal), to eliminate enemy resistance, and to prevent the Panama Defense Forces (PDF) from interfering with Operation Just Cause.

The Company C could rely on fire support consisted of an AC-130 "Spectre" gunship and AH-6 attack helicopters. The American plan called for the AC-130 was to clear three .50-caliber machine gun positions and a ZPU-4 anti-aircraft position at the airport, while the AH-6s neutralised the PDF guard tower.

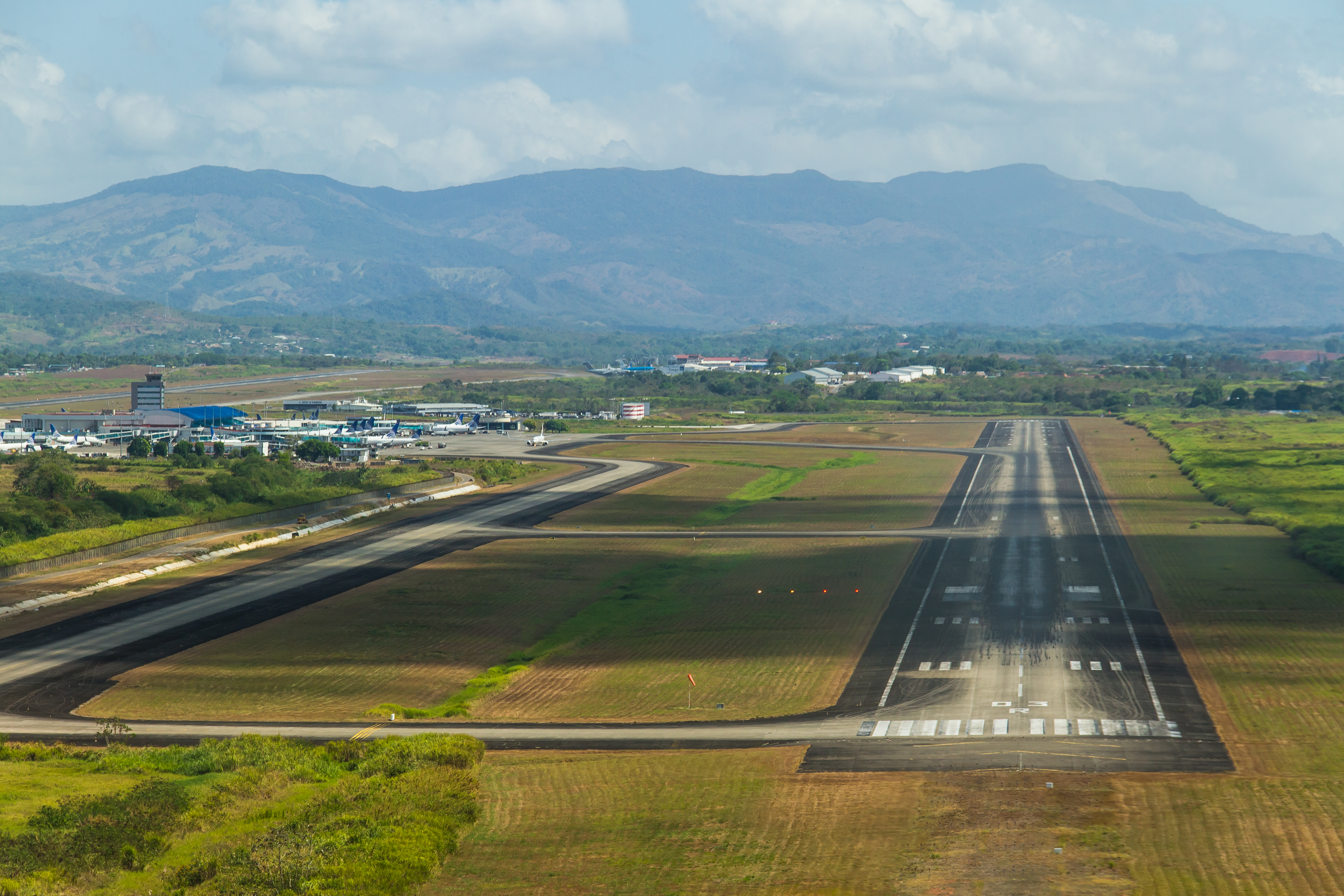

Initially, U.S. intelligence indicated that there were very few people in the main terminal at H-Hour. However, two international flights had just landed at the airport, which was still fully operational. As a result of this, there were actually 398 civilians in the airport rather than the few dozen that the Americans had expected to find. In addition, to this intelligence failure the PDF's 2nd Company was on alert and was patrolling in and around the airport terminal buildings.

== The operation ==
The Rangers began their operations after another group had launched preliminary airstrikes against the Panamanian Defense Forces defending the airfield. After this they airdropped towards the airfield from a height of 500 feet, which was 300 feet less than their training drops in the US. Unfortunately, some Rangers forgot to release their rucksacks and ended up injuring their ankles upon landing. Despite this setback, they managed to secure the airfield with relatively little resistance, though there was some gunfire in the main terminal building. While the mission was successful, some accounts of the event suggest that one Ranger lost their life during the battle.

== Aftermath ==
On the morning of 20 December 1989, at approximately 7am, the Ranger company was able to linked up with units from the 82nd Airborne Division. The prisoners, detainees, and confiscated documents and weapons were turned over to the military police company commander of the 82nd Airborne Division.

During the course of the operation to capture the airport, only 1 ranger was killed and 5 were wounded. Whereas 5 PDF soldiers were killed and 21 were captured.
