= Mohawk Valley raid =

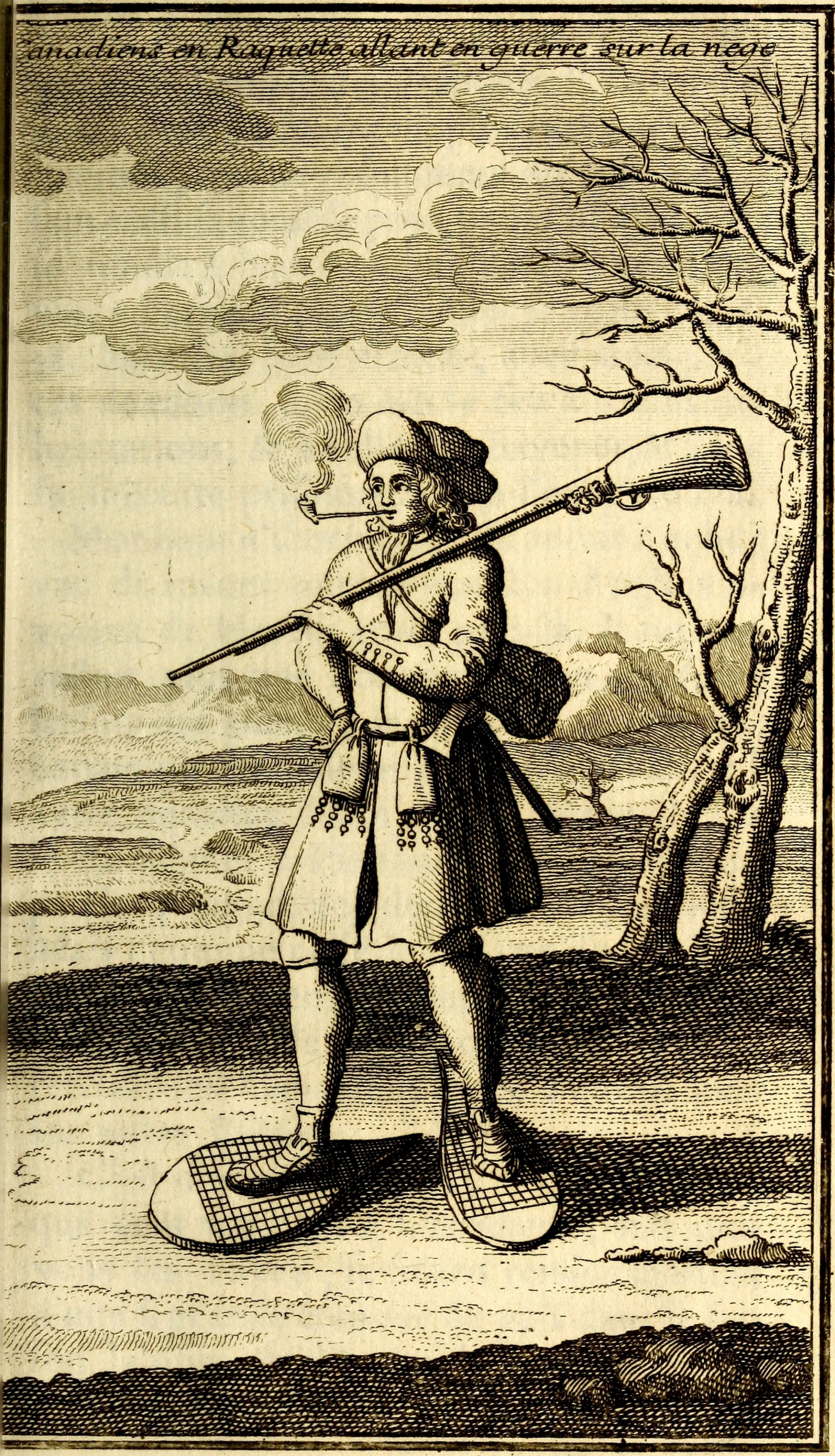
French Canadian soldier or militia in winter clothing during the Mohawk Valley raid.

The Mohawk Valley raid (February 1692) was conducted against three Mohawk villages located in the Mohawk River valley by French and Indigenous warriors under the overall command of Nicolas d'Ailleboust de Manthet. The action, part of a long-running French-Haudenosaunee conflict and King William's War, which pitted the French against the Haudenosaunee-allied English, resulted in the destruction of three villages, including critical stores of food. Many Mohawks were either killed or captured, with the latter intended to populate Christian Indian villages near Montreal.

The raiders, burdened with their prisoners, were followed by a rapidly deployed English-Haudenosaunee force led by Major Pieter Schuyler. The two forces engaged in skirmishing a few days after the raid. Because of the pursuit, the raiders were forced to release most of their prisoners, and were subjected to starvation due to the spoilage of some of their supply caches before they returned to Montreal.

The Mohawk were seriously weakened as a military force within the Haudenosaunee League, and the raid's effects contributed to the 1701 peace negotiated between the Haudenosaunee, French, and many other tribes.
