= Operación Lince Norte =

2011 Mexican drug war military operation

- Part of the Mexican drug war
Date	July 16, 2011 – August 4, 2011
Location	Tamaulipas, Nuevo León, Coahuila and San Luis Potosí, Mexico
Status	Mexican Army victory

Belligerents
Mexican Army	Gulf Cartel; Los Zetas

Commanders and leaders
Felipe Calderón; Guillermo Galván Galván; Noé Sandoval Alcázar	Miguel Treviño Morales; Heriberto Lazcano Lazcano

Strength
4,000 soldiers	Unknown

Casualties and losses
1 killed 21 wounded	30 killed 11 wounded

Operación Lince Norte (Operation Lynx North) was a military operation carried out by the Mexican Secretariat of National Defense from July 16 to August 4, 2011, in the states of Coahuila, Nuevo León, Tamaulipas, and San Luis Potosí. The main objective was to weaken Los Zetas and the Gulf Cartel.

During the operation, 26 organized crime attacks were prevented and repelled.

== Seized assets and achievements ==
- 1,217 firearms
- 3.3 tons of marijuana
- 39,000,700 United States dollars
- 260 vehicles
- 188 communication equipment
- 14 real estate properties
