= Battle of Duarte Bridge =

Battle during the Dominican Civil War

- Part of the Dominican Civil War
Date	27 April 1965
Location	Santo Domingo, Dominican Republic
Result	Constitutionalist victory

Belligerents
Dominican Republic (Loyalist faction)	Dominican Republic (Constitutionalist faction)

Commanders and leaders
(Dominican Republic) Elías Wessin y Wessin	(Dominican Republic) Francisco Caamaño

Strength
4,000 regulars 16 tanks	Unknown

Casualties and losses
Unknown number of killed 14 tanks lost	Unknown

The Battle of Duarte Bridge took place on 27 April 1965, during the Dominican Civil War. The battle resulted in a victory for the Constitutionalists.

== Battle ==
On 27 April 1965, a sizeable Loyalist force of tanks, armored cars, artillery, and infantry began to rumble across Duarte Bridge under covering fire from 12.7 mm machine guns on the eastern bank. When the armored column passed José Martí Street one block from Duarte Avenue, armed civilians attacked the Loyalist infantry and unleashed a hail of fire from machine guns and mortars; most of the troops either fled or were killed. Without infantry support, the unescorted tanks, already in the narrow streets of the neighborhood, were easy targets for the Molotov cocktails soon being tossed from the surrounding buildings. The Loyalists were routed and several tanks were abandoned and put into use by the rebels.
