= Bridgewater Commons =

Shopping mall in Somerset County, New Jersey, U.S.

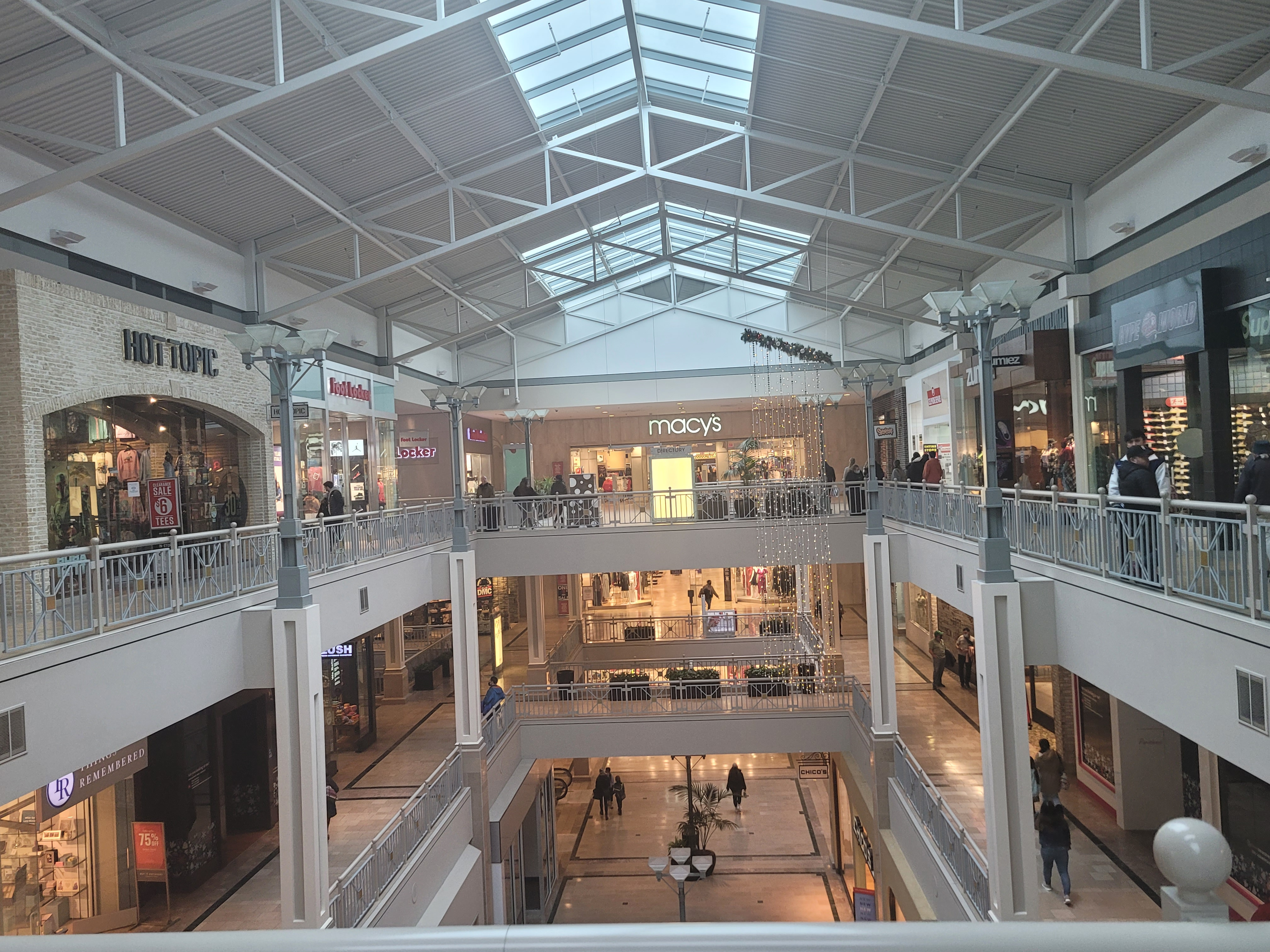
- Macy's wing (January 2022)
- Location: 400 Commons Way; Bridgewater Township, New Jersey, U.S.
- Coordinates: 40°35′09″N 74°37′10″W
- Opened: February 24, 1988; 38 years ago
- Developer: The Hahn Company
- Manager: Pacific Retail Capital Partners (Bridgewater Commons); Urban Edge Properties (The Village)
- Owner: Pacific Retail Capital Partners (Bridgewater Commons); Urban Edge Properties (The Village)
- Num. of stores: 170
- Num. of anchor tenants: 2
- Floor area: 1,200,000 sq ft (110,000 m^{2})
- Floors: 3
- Parking: Parking lot and 3-story parking garage east of AMC
- Public transit: NJ Transit bus: 65, 114
- Website: bridgewatercommons.com

Bridgewater Commons, colloquially known as the Bridgewater Mall and the Bridgewater Commons Mall, is a fully enclosed shopping mall located in Bridgewater Township, New Jersey. The mall is located at the intersection of Route 22 and Route 202/206 and borders Interstate 287.

The mall opened on February 24, 1988, as Somerset County's first shopping mall and the main property has a gross leasable area of 900,000 sq ft (84,000 m^{2})

In 2006, The Village joined The Commons, consisting of an open-air shopping district that amounts to 94,000 square feet (8,700 m^{2}) with 15 other stores and restaurants. In 2026, mall owner Pacific Retail Capital Partners sold The Village to Urban Edge Properties for $54.3 million.

== History ==
In the 1960s, a township redevelopment agency combined various plots of land in Bridgewater and declared the entire area blighted so that the land could be sold to one developer. The tentative name of the development was the Golden Triangle Mall, later changed to Bridgewater Commons in 1974.

Bridgewater Township signed a contract with The Hahn Company, a California-based mall developer, in 1985. The Prudential's real estate division joined the development project later.

In 1986, R.H. Macy Co. announced they would open a Macy's store in the shopping center, instead of the company's Bamberger's banner, as originally planned. The company was in the process of retiring the Bamberger's brand and converting its Bamberger's stores to its Macy's banner.

Bridgewater Commons opened on February 24, 1988, although Hahnes opened earlier, on February 13, and Macy's opened on February 14. Its anchor stores were Macy's, Hahnes, and Stern's. On June 18, 1988, a Disney Store opened, which was the first Disney Store located outside of California. Hahnes closed in March 1989 and converted to Lord & Taylor the following October.

The mall complex pursued a major expansion in 1991 to add two eight-story office buildings to the complex, which would include 578,000 sq ft (53,700 m^{2}) of office space and a 300-room hotel. The effort was initiated as part of a longstanding urban renewal project. By 2000, with a 347-room Bridgewater Marriott Hotel already under construction, the mall's developers pushed ahead to develop the office towers planned for the complex. The two towers later opened, occupied mostly by Brother Industries and Sanofi-Aventis.

In 1993, Bridgewater Commons became one of the first malls in the state to ban smoking, joining 300 of 1800 malls nationwide that prohibited smoking on mall grounds.

In 2001, Macy's announced that two Stern's stores would close that year and reopen as Bloomingdale's stores in 2002; Bridgewater was one of them. The other store that was affected was the Wayne location, located at the Willowbrook Mall.

In 2003, upscale seafood chain McCormick & Schmick's opened.

In November 2008, the food court reopened after extensive renovation, continuing to rotate through restaurants on a regular basis. As of November 2025, the dining options span categories such as American, Asian Fusion, Beverages, Chicken, Chinese, Coffee and Tea, Desserts, Fast Food, Italian, Mexican, Salad, Sandwiches and Soups, and Seafood. Long-standing chains are Arthur Treacher's Fish and Chips, Charley's Philly Steaks, Nathan's Famous Hot Dogs, Saladworks, and Sarku Japan.

Throughout 2010, Bridgewater Commons sought an increase in entertainment and restaurant occupants with The Cheesecake Factory opening in August and both AMC Dine-in Theatres and California Pizza Kitchen opening in November.

In November 2016, Redstone American Grill opened their second New Jersey location in a pad next to California Pizza Kitchen. Redstone would close in January 2026.

McCormick & Schmick's closed in January 2019 due to the expiration of their lease. The space was filled in February 2020, when Mexican food chain Uncle Julio’s opened their first New Jersey location.

In August 2020, Lord & Taylor announced they would close their Bridgewater Commons location as part of their plan to liquidate and shutter all their remaining stores after the company declared bankruptcy.

In December 2022, the town council approved a zoning ordinance for the former Lord & Taylor anchor pad to attract entertainment and amusement establishments such as Topgolf or Dave & Buster's to occupy the vacant space.

In May 2023, Pacific Retail Capital Partners acquired the mall and The Village from Trademark Properties to revitalize the properties into a "vibrant mixed-use destination". A purchase price has not been disclosed.

In June 2024, Brazilian steakhouse chain Fogo de Chão opened their venue at the mall.

The Commons currently consists of some of America's most popular brands such as Abercrombie and Fitch, Apple, Alo Yoga, Athleta, Lululemon, LUSH, J. Crew, Pottery Barn, Sephora, Swarovski, Williams-Sonoma, and more.

In April 2025, Popeyes Louisiana Kitchen joined the Commons's food court.

In October 2025, a spokesperson from Pacific Retail Capital Partners stated that the mall will undergo renovations that will conclude sometime in 2026. The mall's food court will be renovated, along with dedicated sections for children, and updated lighting, paint, and artwork.

In September 2026, Bridgewater Councilman Timothy Ring stated at a Township Council meeting that the mall was working to fill the vacant Lord & Taylor space, which had been complicated by the chain's bankruptcy.

=== The Village at Bridgewater Commons ===
The Village at Bridgewater Commons, a lifestyle center adjacent to the mall's property, officially opened on Saturday, September 23, 2006 with two anchors: Crate & Barrel and Maggiano's Little Italy, which opened a month before.

In May 2015, casual burger restaurant Shake Shack opened their first Central Jersey location in The Village occupying the space vacated by Coldwater Creek. This marked the chain’s third location in the state of New Jersey. The chain sits right next to the property's Starbucks. They joined clothing retailers Banana Republic and White House Black Market.

In October 2017, Mediterranean restaurant chain Cava opened their third New Jersey location at The Village in the former Brooks Brothers space.

In November 2021, Crate & Barrel, an anchor of The Village, declared its departure from the mall after they opted to not renew their lease. The township re-zoned the building to allow medical use to occupy the space. Summit Health opened in the former Crate & Barrel in November 2024.

In December 2024, The Village added golf-fitting retail outlet Club Champion, facial and skincare bar Face Foundrié, regional sandwich chain Millburn Deli, juice bar Pure Green, as well as restaurants DIG, Sarku Japan, and Big Chicken.

In January 2026, the Bridgewater Township Council approved a resolution allowing Pacific Retail Capital Partners the ability to sell off The Village. In April, it was officially sold to Urban Edge Properties for $54.3 million. The sale allowed PRCP to reduce the mall's debt.

=== Community events ===
The mall has served as a center of community gathering for Somerset County. Since opening, mall management and Somerset Medical Center have sponsored a HealthHike mall walking program to give walkers an indoors, secured, and climate-controlled environment in which to walk. Anyone can obtain a name tag to enter the mall starting at 6:30 a.m. Monday through Saturday and 9 a.m. Sunday. The program also includes a monthly meeting at 8:30 a.m. on the first Wednesday of each month from October through June to discuss health-related topics.

Bridgewater Commons chooses to host many activities with local organizations. As of 2025, collaborators include Salvation Army, the NJ National Guard Army Band, NJ Academy of Music, and more.

The mall also participates in an annual Christmas display and kids photo opportunity with Santa Claus in addition to a photo opportunity with the Easter Bunny around Easter time. Other events in 2025 included Diwali at the Commons, the New Jersey Taiwan Fair, hosting RoboCon weekend, plus a series of Lunar New Year events.

In conjunction with the Shimon and Sara Birnbaum Jewish Community Center, the mall's parking lot serves as the center of events throughout the year such as Spring Carnival and Community Day (or Family Fun Day), which has been occurring annually since 2021. Community Day is tailored towards younger kids and families and admission is free. Activities include touch-a-truck, inflatables, food trucks, and other vendors.

Ahead of new renovations announced in October 2025, Bridgewater Township mayor Matthew Moench said, "This is extremely exciting news for the Bridgewater community. Bridgewater Commons is not just a place to shop; it’s at the economic and social core of our town."
