= The Shops at Sunvet =

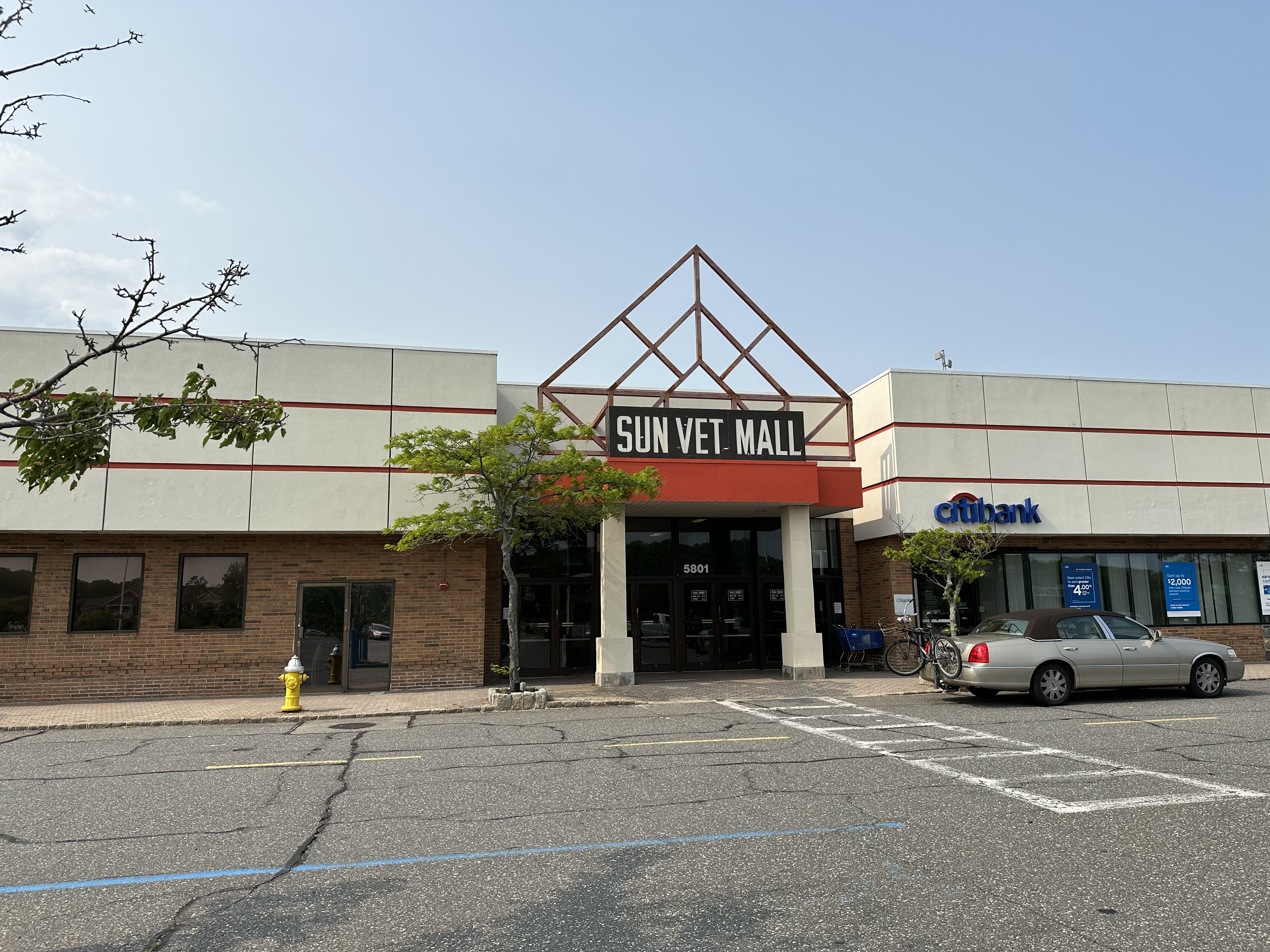
- An entrance to the Sun Vet Mall in May 2023.
- Location: Holbrook, New York
- Coordinates: 40.7705844°N 73.0637223°W
- Address: 5801 Sunrise Highway, Holbrook, New York 11741
- Opened: 1974
- Developer: TBA (1974-2000s); Breslin Realty (Unknown-2014); Schuckman Realty Inc. (~2015-2021); Blumenfeld Development Group (2022-present)
- Owner: TBA
- Num. of stores: 30
- Num. of anchor tenants: 10 (1 open, 9 vacant)
- Floor area: 270,000 square feet (25,000 m^{2}) (1974-2023); 168,000 square feet (16,000 m^{2}) (2023-present)
- Floors: 1
- Parking: Lighted lot
- Public transit: Suffolk County Transit: 6
- Website: https://www.theshopsatsunvet.com

The Shops at SunVet is an upcoming shopping center located in Holbrook, in Suffolk County, on the South Shore of Long Island, in New York, United States. Previously being a shopping mall, the center opened in 1974 as Sun Vet Mall (also known as the Sun-Vet Mall, SunVet Mall, or simply as Sun Vet), with it becoming a major shopping destination in the area. As of 2023, it is slated to be transformed into an outdoor shopping center, with construction continuing as of October 2023.

The anchor stores have included Toys "R" Us, A.C. Moore, Pathmark, Citibank, Red Wing Shoes, Kid City, Mandee, and Payless Shoes; the Citibank is the only store still in operation as of October 2023.

== History ==
The Sun Vet Mall first opened in 1974. It was called the Sun Vet Mall due to the mall being located in close proximity to both Sunrise Highway (NY 27) and Veterans Memorial Highway (NY 454). Its former tenants included but were not limited to Blockbuster Video, Sears Portrait Studio, Fashion Bug, Radio Shack, FYE, Solar Flare Tanning, ClothesLine, Tuesday Morning, Building Star, SunVet Hobbies, SunVet Optical Center, Hallmark, Contour Express, Bundy Art, and Dollar King.

The mall reported a 2% vacancy rate in 2005, which made it their best rate since 1982. During this time, the mall had 41 stores open.

In June 2017, a Twitter account parodying the mall was reported to be begging for shoppers and running fake promotions. In that same year, the mall was listed as property of the Long Island-based Schuckman Realty group.

In 2018, the shopping mall's biggest anchor, Toys "R" Us filed for bankruptcy, subsequently closing their store in the mall soon after. In that same year, Schuckman Realty announced that redevelopment of the mall would be coming soon with no further information being provided.

One year later, in 2019, the shopping mall's second biggest anchor, A.C. Moore filed for bankruptcy, ultimately causing their Sun Vet location to shut down permanently.

In March 2020, it was announced through an employee that the mall's Mandee location would be closing on the third.

In July 2022, Syosset-based Blumenfeld Development Group purchased the property for a 99-year lease.

On August 6, 2022, the Aegean Pizzeria was closed by its owners due to financial reasons after 50 years of operating in the shopping mall. It was also announced in 2022 that proposals were made to redevelop and transform the struggling mall; it was reported in October that only four tenants remained in business at the mall. That November, it was reported that a Whole Foods, Starbucks, and more stores will occupy spaces in the redeveloped shopping destination.

In May 2023, the Holbrook Chamber of Commerce's president, Rick Ammirati, confirmed the redevelopment plans and told reporters construction would commence later that same year. The revitalization project plans to transform the mall an open-air, 168,000 square-foot (15,600 m^{2)} shopping center; the transformation and redevelopment of the Sun Vet Mall will be executed through a joint venture between Blumenfeld Development Group and Regency Centers, with construction being done through NYM Group. In December, new renders were released with plans to repurpose the left side of the mall.

As of October 16, 2024, 60% of the shopping center has been leased, with the majority of stores opening in 2025 besides the Whole Foods in 2026.

On January 12, 2025, it was reported that Shake Shack, Crumbl, and J.Crew were leasing space at the shopping center. On February 10, the Starbucks store was opened with a "double-sided drive-thru" concept that allows for mobile and traditional orders simultaneously. One day later, the glasses store Warby Parker was announced as having a lease. On April 2, the Citibank previously located in the mall was re-opened after the relocation was finalized.

On September 19, 2025, the Wells Fargo branch opened to the public.

In August 2025, it was reported by Newsday the full redevelopment costed $93 million and around 70% of the spaces are leased by tenants including Tony's Tacos, California Closets, Strong Pilates, and Club Champion. By that point, Starbucks, Aspen Dental, and Citibank were open to the public, with the Crumbl expected to open soon.

On November 1, 2025, a dumpster fire caused by construction debris behind the Whole Foods was successfully put out by the Holbrook Fire Department. Also in November, the Hand & Stone Massage and Facial Spa would open with 25 employees and 550 members.

On February 4, 2026, Whole Foods was scheduled to open on March 5 of that year.

On April 7, 2026, the Shake Shack was announced to be opening on April 15, with each burger purchase on that day contributing to a $1 donation to "Serve All NY".

In mid-August, the Crumbl location opened. On August 24, 2026, it was reported that a Ross Dress for Less store would be occupying space next to the Whole Foods. In early September, the MÓGŪ location opened.

== Transportation ==
The Shops at SunVet are served by Suffolk County Transit bus route 6.

== See also ==
- Mall at the Source
- Sunrise Mall
