= Poke House =

Italian foodtech company

Poke House srl
- Industry: Food tech
- Founded: 2018
- Founder: Matteo Pichi, Vittoria Zanetti
- Headquarters: Milan, Italy

Poke House or PH is a fast casual restaurant chain that serves healthy bowls. It was founded in November 2018 by Matteo Pichi and Vittoria Zanetti in Milan, Italy.

As of October 2023, it has 142 directly operated stores in 8 different countries: Italy, USA, Portugal, Spain, France, UK, Romania and Austria (under "Honu" brand). The Company owns participations in 2 additional brands: Sweetfin in California (20 stores) and Poke Perfect (14 stores) in the Netherlands. The CEO is Matteo Pichi and the company has over 1,200 employees including around 100 in 7 offices located in Milan (HQ), Miami, Lisbon, Madrid, London, Bucharest and Paris.

== History ==
Poke House has opened its first location in November 2018 in Milan, in Isola.

In March 2020 Poke House raised €5m from Milan Investment partners when the Company had already opened 8 stores in Milan. The Investment has allowed Poke House to expand outside of Milan and to do the first international M&A in Portugal.

In April 2020 Poke House acquired 70% of Poke House Portugal (4 stores in Lisbon) from the 2 founders Francisco Guedes and Duarte Costa. The Company now operates 23 stores in Portugal.

In November 2020, Poke House opened its first international location in Spain in Parquesur shopping center. This opening was then followed by openings in Madrid, Barcelona, Valencia and San Sebastián.

In March 2021, the Company raised €20m from Eulero Capital with the contributions of current investors. The Round has allowed PH to complete a second M&A acquisition buying 100% of Ahi Poke. Poke House currently operates 10 locations in London, UK.

In June 2021 Poke House expanded in France with the opening of its first location in Les Quatre temps shopping center in Paris. The Company now operates 9 stores in France between Paris and Marseille (one location in the Prado shopping center). In July 2021 PH announced an expansion in the Netherlands through an investment in the brand leader Poke Perfect.

In 2021 and 2022, the company was included in the Top startup Italia by LinkedIn rating. In 2022, Poke House was noted in the Next Generation Italian Icons Interbrand.

Sweetfin, a poke bowl chain from California, was included into the Poke House family in January 2022.

In April 2022, PH acquired the majority of Austrian Brand Honu Poke (3 stores in Wien). The brand currently operates 7 stores in Austria.

In July 2022, the brand opened its first location in Bucharest, Romania where it currently operates with 2 stores.

In September 2022, Poke House ranks first in the ranking of leading Italian chains with revenues of more than 40 million euros according to the second edition of the report "The Poké Market in Italy" by Growth Capital.

In addition, in September 2022 Poke House opened its first brick and mortar store in Miami, followed by 2 additional stores in Miami, in South Beach and MidTown.

In October 2022, Poke House announced its collaboration with Goldman Sachs to explore potential opportunities in the Market.

In March 2023 the Brand launched its proprietary app to allow customers to order for take away and delivery directly from the app.

By May 2023, another significant financial round was completed, this time led by Red Circle Investments, a firm owned by OTB founder Renzo Rosso.
