= Cheerwine =

Cherry-flavored soft drink

- Type: Soft drink
- Manufacturer: Carolina Beverage Corporation
- Origin: United States
- Introduced: 1917; 109 years ago
- Color: Burgundy
- Flavor: Black cherry
- Variants: Cheerwine Zero Sugar; Caffeine-free Diet Cheerwine; Retro Cheerwine; Holiday Cheerwine Punch; Cheerwine Kreme (Krispy Kreme–flavored)
- Website: cheerwine.com

Cheerwine is a cherry-flavored soft drink by Carolina Beverage Corporation of Salisbury, North Carolina. It has been produced since 1917, claiming to be "the oldest continuing soft drink company still operated by the same family".

== Overview and history ==
When the Maysville Syrup Company of Maysville, Kentucky, went bankrupt in 1917, L. D. Peeler, Hughston Kirby, Kurt Weinmann and other invested businessmen purchased the company's assets, moved them to North Carolina and set up the Carolina Syrup Company. That same year, Peeler, Kirby and Weinmann purchased a recipe for a cherry-flavored soda from a St. Louis flavor salesman, which was then sold as a product for the new company under the name "Cheerwine". Though it has been around since 1917, Cheerwine first became a registered trademark in 1926.

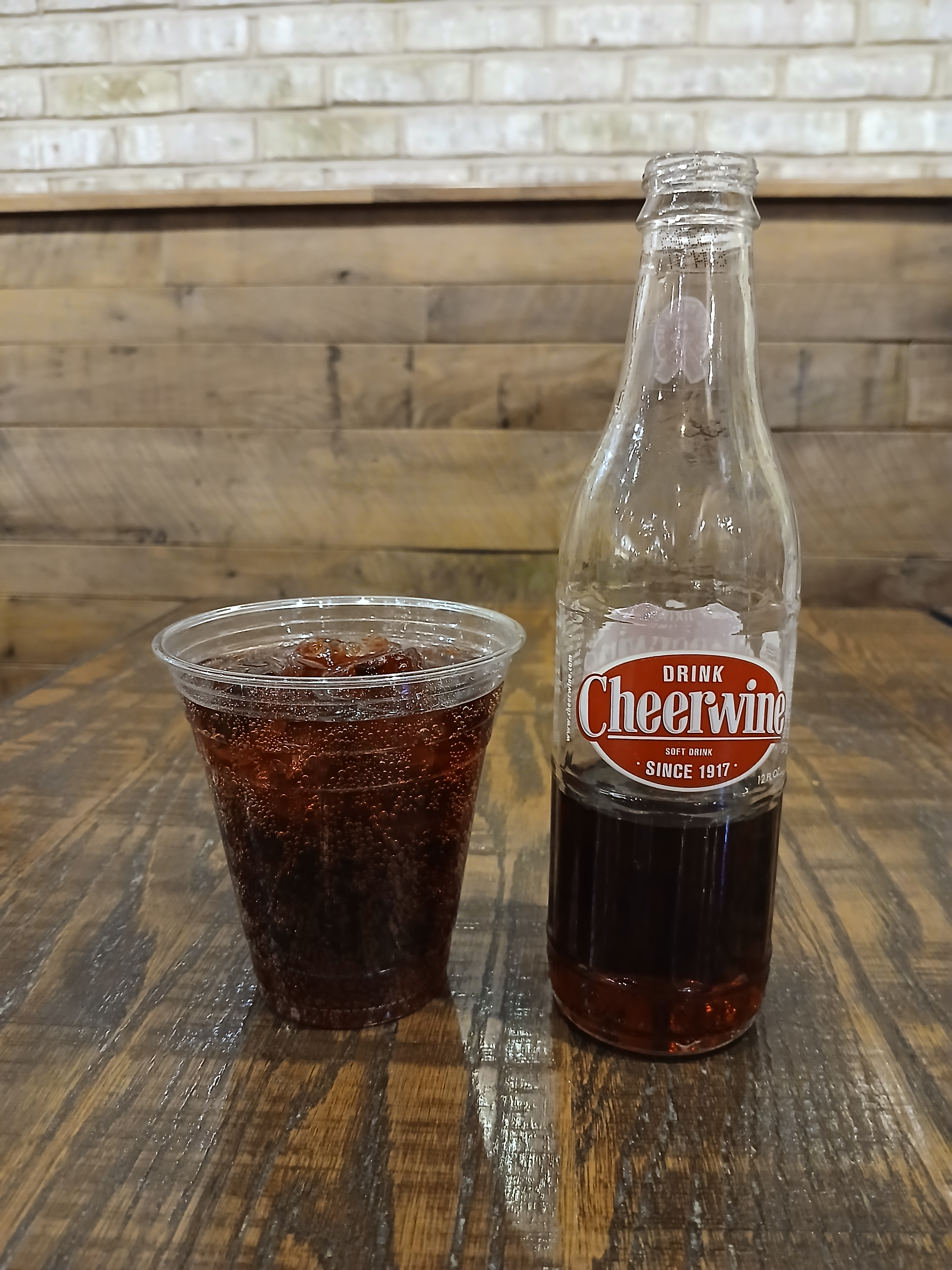
A bottle and cup of Cheerwine at Mission BBQ in 2024

The family of Lewis Peeler has run the Cheerwine company since its founding, and his great-grandson, Charles Clifford "Cliff" Ritchie, has been CEO and president of Cheerwine's parent company, Carolina Beverage Corporation, since 1992.

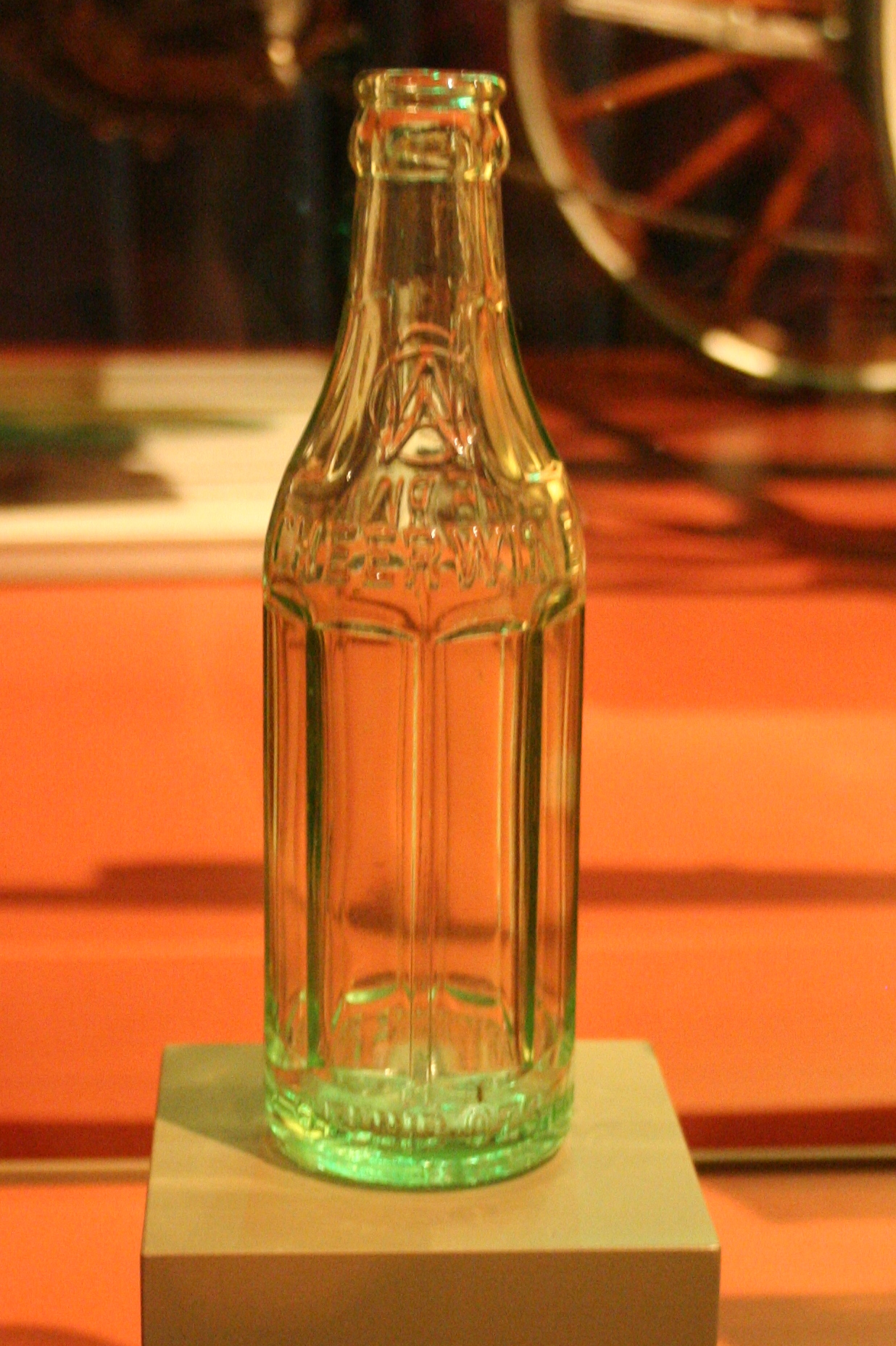
Cheerwine bottle, c. 1920, on display at the North Carolina Museum of History

Cheerwine has a mildly sweet flavor with strong cherry notes, most notably black cherry; is burgundy-colored; and has a high degree of carbonation compared to other soft drinks. The product was named for its color and taste; the company website states that "it made sense to name a burgundy-red, bubbly, cherry concoction—Cheerwine." The "Retro Cheerwine" variant is sold in glass bottles and is sweetened with cane sugar instead of high fructose corn syrup. Despite its name, Cheerwine is not a wine at all, and contains no alcohol.

As of July 2021, Cheerwine's ingredients included carbonated water, high fructose corn syrup, caramel color, phosphoric acid, natural and artificial flavors, caffeine, citric acid, sodium benzoate (to protect flavor), and Red 40.

The company also markets Cheerwine-flavored ice cream, sherbet, and cream bars, mainly in Food Lion, a Salisbury, North Carolina–based supermarket chain.

In the mid-1990s Morgan Shepherd ran an entry in the NASCAR Busch Series with Cheerwine sponsorship.

In 2008, a commercially baked Cheerwine cake, based on an old Southern recipe, became available through a Salisbury-based company.

In 2009, the company began a re-branding campaign designed to revamp the drink's image, especially among younger consumers. The re-branding called for a redesign of the Cheerwine packaging, with a new, retro-style logo based on an early Cheerwine logo.

In 2010, Cheerwine partnered with the North Carolina–based doughnut company, Krispy Kreme, and released a limited-offered Cheerwine flavored donut on July 1 of that year. It was sold only at select grocery stores for the month of July, and at the Salisbury Krispy Kreme. The Cheerwine doughnut returned again in July 2011.

In 2010, Canton, Ohio–based Old Carolina Barbecue became the first restaurant chain in Ohio to offer Cheerwine as a fountain drink.

By 2014, Cheerwine-based products including iced slushy, Cheerwine cakes and floats had become a signature part of the Old Carolina concept.

During the summers of 2016 and 2017, Cheerwine Kreme, a soda with the flavors of Cheerwine and Krispy Kreme, was sold.

In 2017 the Cheerwine Recipe Book was published, by Sandy Carol Sider.

Cheerwine is sometimes mixed with Captain Morgan rum to make a drink called "Captain Cheerwine" or the "Whining Pirate".

Slogans have included "Born in the South. Raised in a Glass", "Nectar of the South", "Betcha can't not smile." and "Uniquely Southern".

== Availability ==
Cheerwine is currently available in much of the southeastern United States, from Maryland south to Florida, but is better known in the Carolinas. Other spots to find Cheerwine are the many "specialty soda" stores throughout the country, as well as WinCo Foods in Washington state, Cracker Barrel restaurants, Kroger at Ford Rd & Canton Center Rd in Canton, Michigan, Cook Out and Bojangles restaurants, Sheetz convenience stores in Ohio and Pennsylvania, and overseas, in Oslo, Norway. It is sold as a glass bottle, 2 liter, 12 pack or as a pack of four glass bottles, and is available as a fountain drink at some restaurants and convenience stores.

In April 2005, other regions of the United States began to bottle Cheerwine, mainly through Pepsi distributors.

On March 9, 2011, The New York Times Diner's Journal referred to "The Expanding Cult of Cheerwine".

On April 5, 2011, the company announced plans for nationwide distribution by 2017, the product's 100th anniversary. The same day, the company also introduced a new advertising campaign, "Born in the South. Raised in a glass." At the time, Cheerwine was available in 12 percent of the nation. Radio commercials for that campaign include "The Caper", where criminals left everything from a store except Cheerwine; and "Battle of the Bulge", in which a soldier from the Salisbury area has two bottles sent to him during World War II and gives one to his friend.

Also in April 2011, Cheerwine announced it was searching for a woman to represent the company as "Miss Cheerwine". Candidates had to be 21 to 25 years old and live in Georgia, North Carolina, South Carolina, Tennessee, or Virginia. A company spokesperson stated, "We’re looking for a poised, enthusiastic young woman who can help us spread the legend and get Cheerwine into the hands of our fans with charm, confidence, sweetness and a sense of fun." On June 3, 2011, Spencer Cummings, named the first Miss Cheerwine, began the Miss Cheerwine Summer Legend Tour.

On October 18, 2011, Cheerwine announced plans to partner with Pepsi Beverages Co. in Atlanta, Georgia, Florida, and Memphis, Tennessee. The same week, the company began using glass bottles to distribute the "Original 1917 Formula" with sugar, as well as introduced 12-pack cans.

On June 16, 2014, Birmingham's Buffalo Rock Co. announced Cheerwine distribution in Alabama, western Georgia, and the Florida Panhandle. This added about 6.5 million potential new customers to their distribution footprint.

== Cheerwine Festival ==
In 2017, for Cheerwine's centennial, Salisbury, North Carolina held a celebration which became an annual event, even attracting visitors from outside the state as of 2025. The festival includes food, children's activities and music by lesser-known artists who need exposure.
