= Sunski =

- Industry: Fashion and Apparel
- Founded: 2012
- Headquarters: San Francisco, California, United States
- Website: sunski.com

Sunski is a sunglasses and lifestyle apparel brand founded in 2012, in San Francisco, California. The company launched on Kickstarter with the intent of creating an affordable, polarized line of sunglasses. Sunski positions itself as an independent alternative to the existing major optical conglomerates that dominate the sunglasses market.

Sunski is a member of 1% For the Planet, and donates a percentage of its revenue to environmental nonprofit organizations, in addition to organizing charitable events and initiatives.
