= Cyrus Veyssi =

American influencer

- Born: Brookline, Massachusetts
- Education: Tufts University (BA)
- Occupation: Influencer

Cyrus Veyssi is an American influencer. They (Note: Veyssi is nonbinary and uses he/him and they/them pronouns.) are best known for their social media content focused on beauty and manifesting, in addition to their content focused on their status as a nonbinary first-generation Iranian immigrant. They were named to the Time 100 Creators in 2025. They co-hosted 10-episode Amazon Prime talk show Influenced. They created their own book-journal, Honey, in 2026.

== Biography ==
They were raised in Brookline, Massachusetts, as the child of first-generation immigrants from Iran. They have described the neighborhood as "predominantly white". From a young age, they were "drawn to femininity", but didn't express it until after they came out as gay to their parents when they were 10. They first started using makeup at around 11 or 12. They attended Tufts University, where they majored in sociology and minored in media and communications. They have described their goal to be like Grace Coddington. During college, they explored their gender identity. They came out to their parents a second time, as nonbinary, while in college.

They went on to work in communications, working as a creative at a marketing agency. They first went viral online after a post of theirs was reposted by Them. They subsequently began to create beauty and lifestyle content, focused on queer Persian people like them. During this period, they collaborated with Glossier. They left their communications job in mid-2023.

The video they described as their "first viral video", however, came much later, and included both Veyssi and their dad. It was in response to a negative comment implying that their dad left them. Their relationship with their parents was described by Coveteur as a "pure and loving bond". At this point, they also shifted to show more of their personality in their posts.

They have created a character for themselves as the "bougie gay uncle". They have also emphasized social justice issues, stating that to them, "Beauty is political. Gender is political. Fashion is political." According to the magazine Paper, Veyssi's approach is "always joyful". They have faced hate comments, predominantly from their own South West Asia and North Africa community. They have also emphasized the flaws in beauty standards, and have discussed fragrance as gender-affirming and as carrying memories.

They were the central face of a campaign by Caudalie. This led to their photo being displayed on dozens of New York City busses. They also partnered with Dig to create a Sumac Yogurt and Chicken plate inspired by Persian flavors, of which a portion was donated to NYC Pride.

They starred in a Google Shopping ad in December 2024, which was opposed by Fox News host Sean Hannity and anti-trans activist Riley Gaines: Gaines stated Google did well "if their goal was to make Americans frustrated and to lose money" in response to the ad.

They co-hosted the Amazon Prime show Influenced, along with other content creators such as Tefi Pessoa, in 2024. The show emphasized Gen Z and Millennial affairs.

In 2023, they spoke out against Iran's government after the death of Mahsa Amini. During the 2025–2026 Iranian protests, Veyssi emphasized advocacy for the LGBTQ+ community in Iran and used their platform to show Irani cultural traditions on LGBTQ identities, as well as their current treatment.

They were named to the In The Know Honors by Yahoo Life in 2021. They were named to The Hollywood Reporter Rising Influencers of 2024. They were named to the Time 100 Creators in 2025. In 2026, they self-published their own book-journal, Honey, featuring thirty affirmations and thirty blank pages.

They met their boyfriend after tripping outside a Soulcycle class.
