= Caudalie =

Multi-channel French skincare company

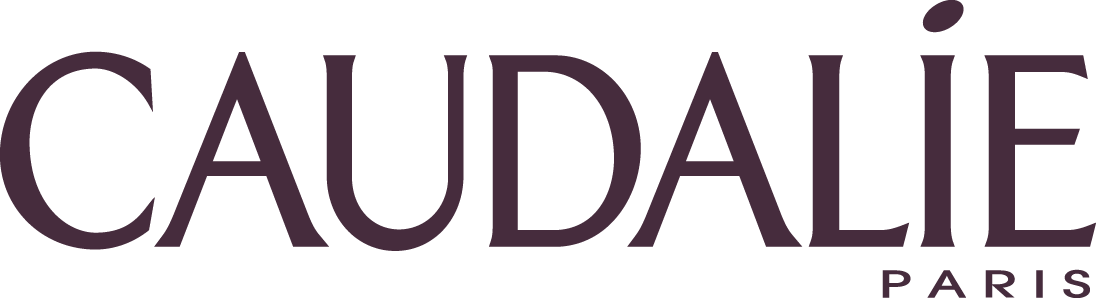

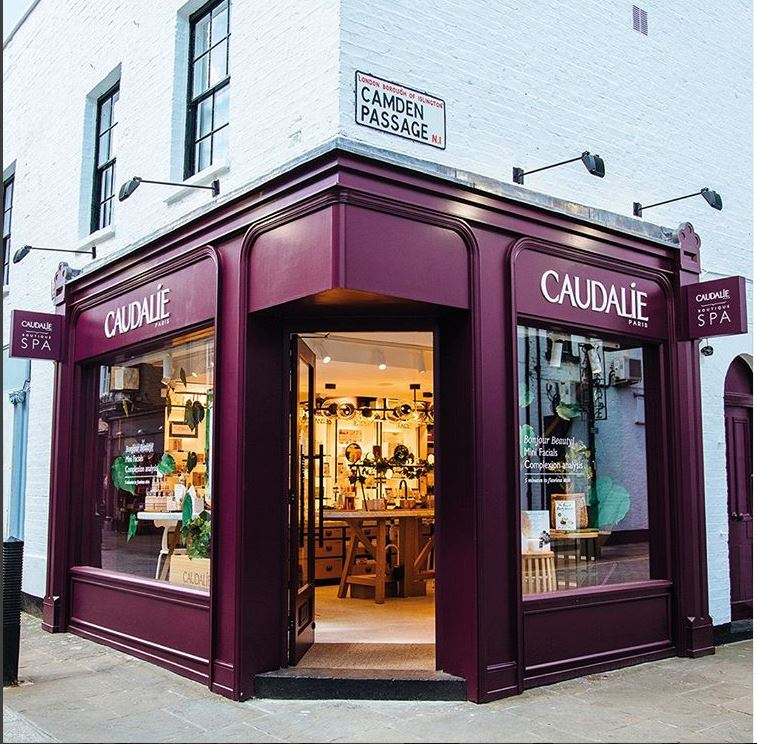
- Industry: Skincare
- Founded: 1995 in Paris, France
- Founders: Mathilde Thomas et Bertrand Thomas
- Headquarters: Paris, France
- Area served: Worldwide
- Products: Skincare, body care, fragrance, mask
- Website: http://www.caudalie.com/

Caudalie is a French skincare company that is specialized in vinotherapy. It is known for its skincare products crafted from the harnessed extracts of grapes and grapevines. On the family estate, the discovery of a hot spring 1,500 feet underground inspired the creation of the first Vinotherapy Spa.

== History ==
Caudalie takes its name from the unit of measurement, the Caudalie, pronounced ko-da-li, used in oenology, the study of wine.

In 1993, during the harvest at Château Smith Haut Lafitte, Mathilde Thomas and her husband Bertrand Thomas met Professor Joseph Vercauteren, a polyphenols specialist from the Pharmacy University in Bordeaux and his research team. Mr. Vercauteren shared one of his discoveries with them - that PCOs (procyanidolic oligomers) extracted from grape-seeds, are more effective than vitamin E against free radicals.

In 1995, Mathilde and Bertrand Thomas launched Caudalie by developing three products containing stabilized grape-seed polyphenols with anti-aging properties.

In 1996, Caudalie signed a research agreement with the Bordeaux Pharmacy Faculty and created a team of researchers, leading to the development of two further patents, Resveratrol and Viniferine.

In September 1999, Mathilde and Bertrand Thomas created their first Vinothérapie Spa in the grounds of Château Smith Haut Lafitte. This spa combines water from a natural hot water spring with extracts from grapes and the grapevine.

Early in 2013, Caudalie opened its first boutique in Brazil.

In 2015, Caudalie filed a new patent following the discovery of combining vine stalk Resveratrol with hyaluronic acid. This also marked the launch of a new anti-ageing range, Resveratrol[Lift].

In 2017, Caudalie opened its New York flagship boutique 'La Maison Caudalie' in the Meatpacking District, NYC.

In 2018, Caudalie opened its Natural Formulation Laboratory as well as a new site in Gidy, near Orleans, France.

In 2018, Caudalie launched Vinopure, a new range designed specifically for oily, blemish-prone skin types. The range was awarded a Marie Claire Prix d'excellence de la Beauté in 2019.

In 2019, Caudalie launched a new line of eco-friendly sun care products in support of Coral Guardian, a company which plants corals in Indonesia.

In 2024, they created a line called Vinoperfect, which Cyrus Veyssi served as the face of.

== Economics ==
Caudalie is an independent and family-owned business. In 2018, Mathilde Thomas was presented with a French Legion of Honor award by Prime Minister, Edouard Philippe, for her entrepreneurial achievements and commitment to creating products which are both eco-friendly and effective.

== Laboratory & Research ==
Caudalie has its own Natural Formulation Laboratory situated in Gidy, France and works in partnership with Harvard Medical School and anti-ageing guru, Dr David Sinclair, to develop patents to combat skin ageing.

Caudalie also follows a strict ingredients charter named its “cosm-ethics” charter, which bans the use of phthalates, phenoxyethanol, mineral oils, parabens, Sodium Laureth Sulfate, synthetic coloring agents as well as ingredients of animal origin in its product formulas.

== Ecological Commitments ==
Since 2012, Caudalie has been a member of the "1% for the Planet" network and thus contributes 1% of its worldwide turnover to organizations committed to protecting the environment.

Caudalie also supports various associations such as the WWF, Surfrider, Nordesta, Pur Project, NFF, Coeur de Floret and is committed to planting 8 million trees by 2021.

== Products ==
Caudalie offers products for face, body and hair. The brand typically uses natural, active ingredients while using the nutrients of grapevines and grapes.

== Distribution ==
Caudalie's products are sold in over 27 countries worldwide:

- In Europe, in pharmacies
- In America, in Sephora, Blue Mercury and other points of sale
- In Asia, in Sephora as well as department stores

The brand also has 8 Vinotherapie Spas as well as more than 36 Boutique-SPAs around the world.
