= One Percent for the Planet =

Organization of environmental philanthropists

- Formation: 2002; 24 years ago
- Founder: Yvon Chouinard; Craig Mathews
- Purpose: Environmentalism
- Region served: Worldwide
- Website: onepercentfortheplanet.org

One Percent for the Planet is an international organization whose members contribute at least one percent of their annual revenue to environmental causes to protect the environment. Founded by Yvon Chouinard, founder of Patagonia, and Craig Mathews, owner of Blue Ribbon Flies in 2002, the organization encourages "more businesses to donate 1% of sales to environmental groups".

Since its creation, the organization has been joined by countries around the world, with a great number of partners in France, Great Britain, Australia, and Japan. France is the only country to have an independent entity.

== Impact ==
Since its founding, the 1% for the Planet movement has directed substantial funding toward global environmental solutions. The organization reports that more than $870 million has been donated to approved environmental non-profits worldwide.

1% for the Planet's vetted environmental partners are categorized into four impact areas.:

- Rights to Nature: The rights to nature impact area focuses on four impact targets: renewable energy, land and water rights, community conservation, and nature access.
- Conservation & restoration: The conservation and restoration impact area focuses on four impact targets: biodiversity and wildlife, marine ecosystems, freshwater ecosystems, and terrestrial ecosystems.
- Resilient Communities: The resilient communities impact area focuses on four impact targets: climate adaptation, sustainable cities, toxics and pollution, and environmental education.
- Just economies: The just economies impact area focuses on four impact targets: responsible consumption and production, sustainable livelihoods, decarbonization, and food systems.

The movement emphasizes that the environmental partners its business members support are experts in their impact areas and carry out targeted actions directly addressing the causes of environmental imbalances.

== Members ==
Surfclass.com became the first member in Jan 2002. Notable members of the organization include

- Caudalie, a French cosmetics brand.
- Cotopaxi, an outdoor apparel company.
- Flickr, a photo-sharing service.
- KeepCup, an Australian reusable cup brand.
- Klean Kanteen, a producer of reusable stainless steel water bottles.
- The Sunglass Fix, an Australian replacement lenses company.
- New Belgium Brewing Company, a craft brewery.
- OXO, a manufacturer of kitchen utensils and housewares.

Since 1985, Patagonia pledged 1% of sales to the preservation of restoration of the natural environment.
