= Fast casual restaurant =

Type of restaurant

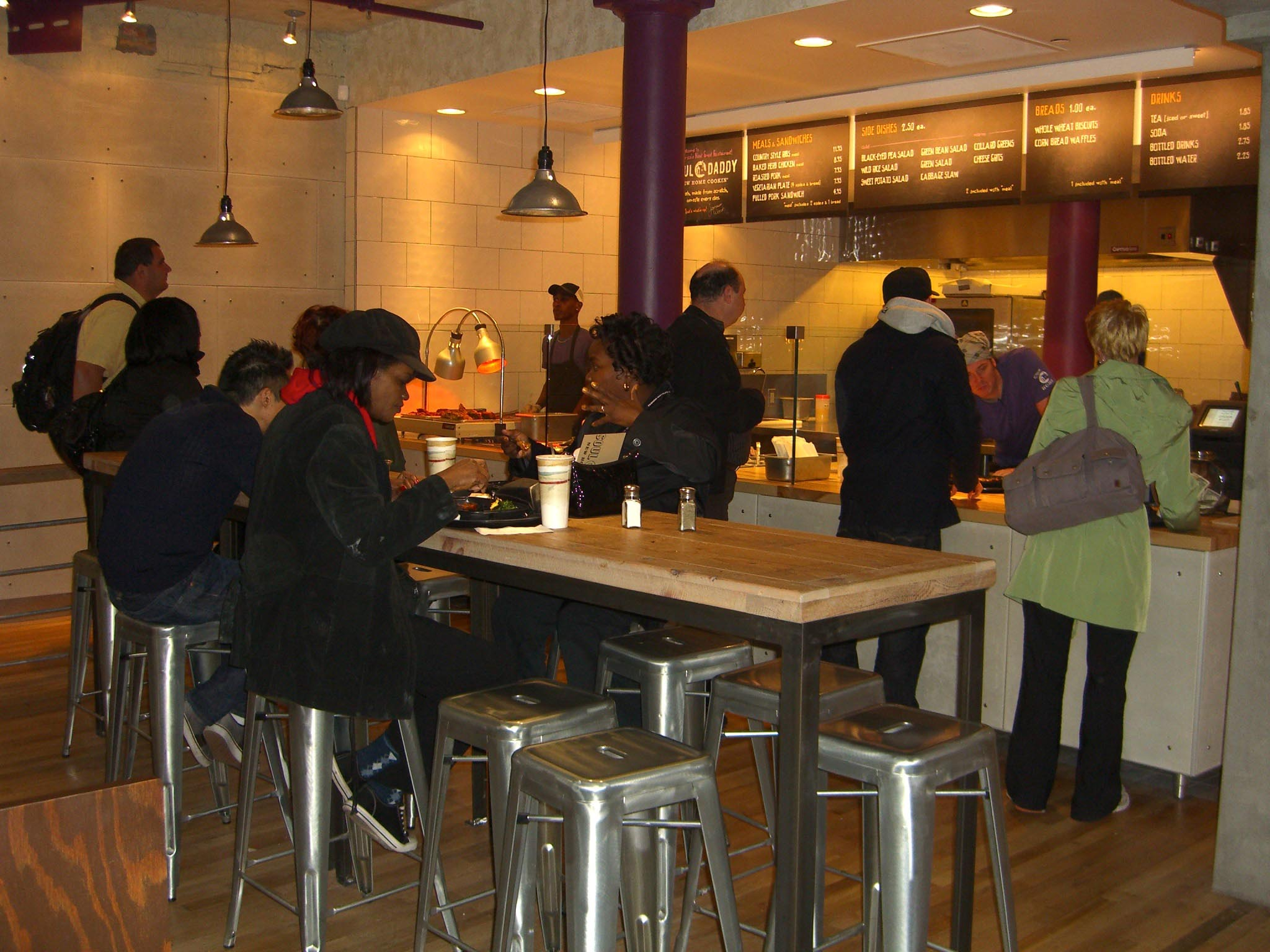
Customers dining and ordering at a (now Chipotle) Soul Daddy outlet in South Street Seaport, Manhattan, New York, in 2011

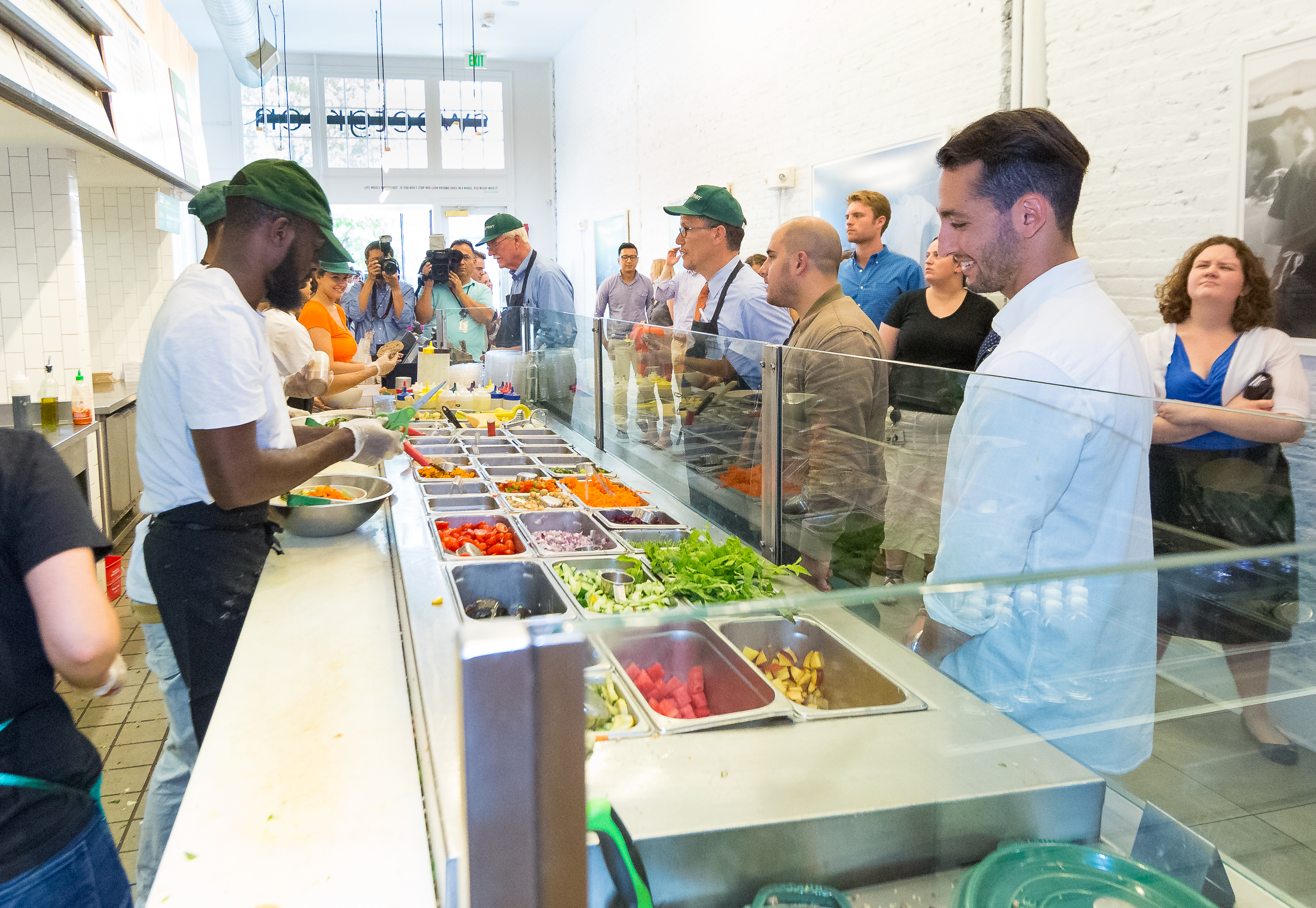
Assembling meals at Sweetgreen

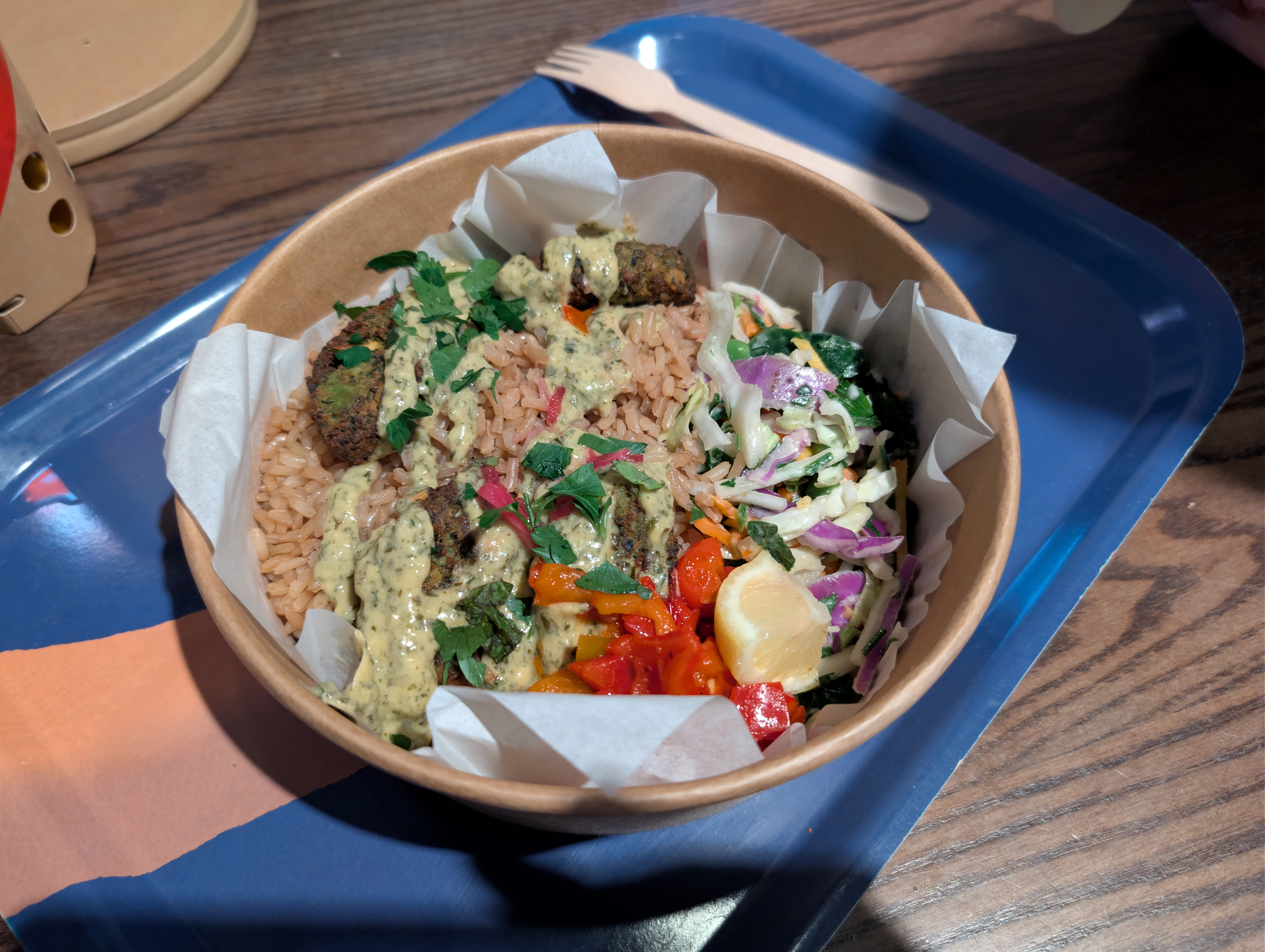
A falafel "slop bowl" at Sweetgreen with green goddess dressing

A fast casual restaurant, found primarily in the United States, is a restaurant that does not offer full table service, but advertises higher quality food than fast-food restaurants. It is an intermediate concept between fast food and casual dining.

== History ==
The concept originated in the United States in the early 1990s, but did not become mainstream until the late 2000s to early 2010s. During the economic recession that began in 2007, the category of fast casual dining saw increased sales to the 18–34-year-old demographic. Customers with limited discretionary spending for meals tend to choose fast casual for dining which they perceive as healthier.

Many fast casual restaurants including Cava, Chipotle Mexican Grill and Sweetgreen serve what are derisively called "slop bowls", where the meal consists of what the New York Times called a "nebulous mash of ingredients" assembled to order in a cardboard container.

Major fast casual food chains saw reduced earnings in 2025, attributed to customers reducing their spending and increased competition. Researchers noted that more consumers, particularly young ones, are making their own lunches.

== Origin of the term ==
The founder and publisher of FastCasual.com, Paul Barron, is credited with coining the term "fast-casual" in the late 1990s. Horatio Lonsdale-Hands, former chairman and CEO of ZuZu Inc., is also credited with coining the term. ZuZu, a handmade Mexican food concept co-founded by Lonsdale-Hands and Espartaco Borga in 1989, filed a U.S. Federal trademark registration for the term "fast-casual" in November 1995, leading Michael DeLuca to call Lonsdale-Hands a "progressive pioneer in the burgeoning 'fast-casual' market segment" in the July 1996 edition of Restaurant Hospitality.

== Definition ==
The company Technomic Information Services defined "fast-casual restaurants" as meeting the following criteria:

- Limited-service, cafeteria-style or self-service format
- Average meal price between $8 and $15
- Made-to-order food with more complex flavors than fast food restaurants
- Upscale, unique or highly developed décor
- Most often will not have a drive-through

== Examples of fast casual restaurants ==
- Au Bon Pain
- Barburrito
- Beef-a-roo
- Blaze Pizza
- BurgerFi
- Captain D's
- Cava
- Chipotle Mexican Grill
- Chopt
- Culver's
- Dig Inn
- El Pollo Loco
- Fat Bastard Burrito
- Farmer Boys
- Firehouse Subs
- Five Guys
- Freddy's Frozen Custard & Steakburgers
- Fuddruckers
- Jason's Deli
- Jersey Mike's Subs
- Jimmy John's
- Just Salad
- McAlister's Deli
- Mendocino Farms
- Mission BBQ
- Mixt Greens
- Moe's Southwest Grill
- Mucho Burrito
- Panera Bread
- Portillo's Restaurants
- Potbelly Sandwich Shop
- Pret A Manger
- Qdoba
- Raising Cane's Chicken Fingers
- Saladworks
- Shake Shack
- Smashburger
- Sweetgreen
- Taco del Mar
- Taïm
- Tijuana Flats
- The Halal Guys
- Tropical Smoothie Cafe
- Wingstop
- Zaxby's

== See also ==
- List of casual dining restaurant chains
- List of fast food restaurant chains
- Delicatessen
- Diner
