= Chopt =

American fast food restaurant chain

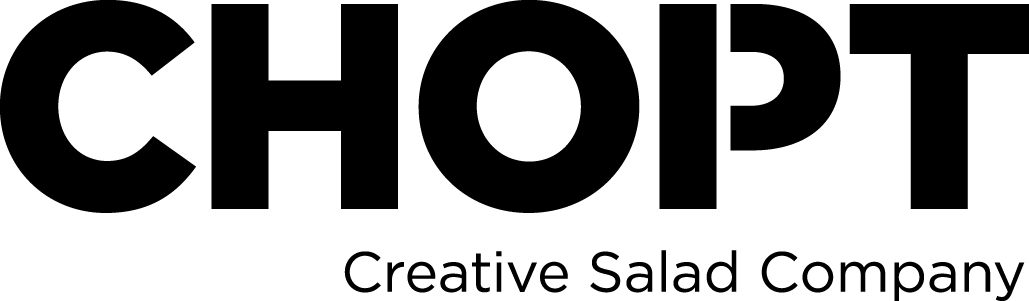

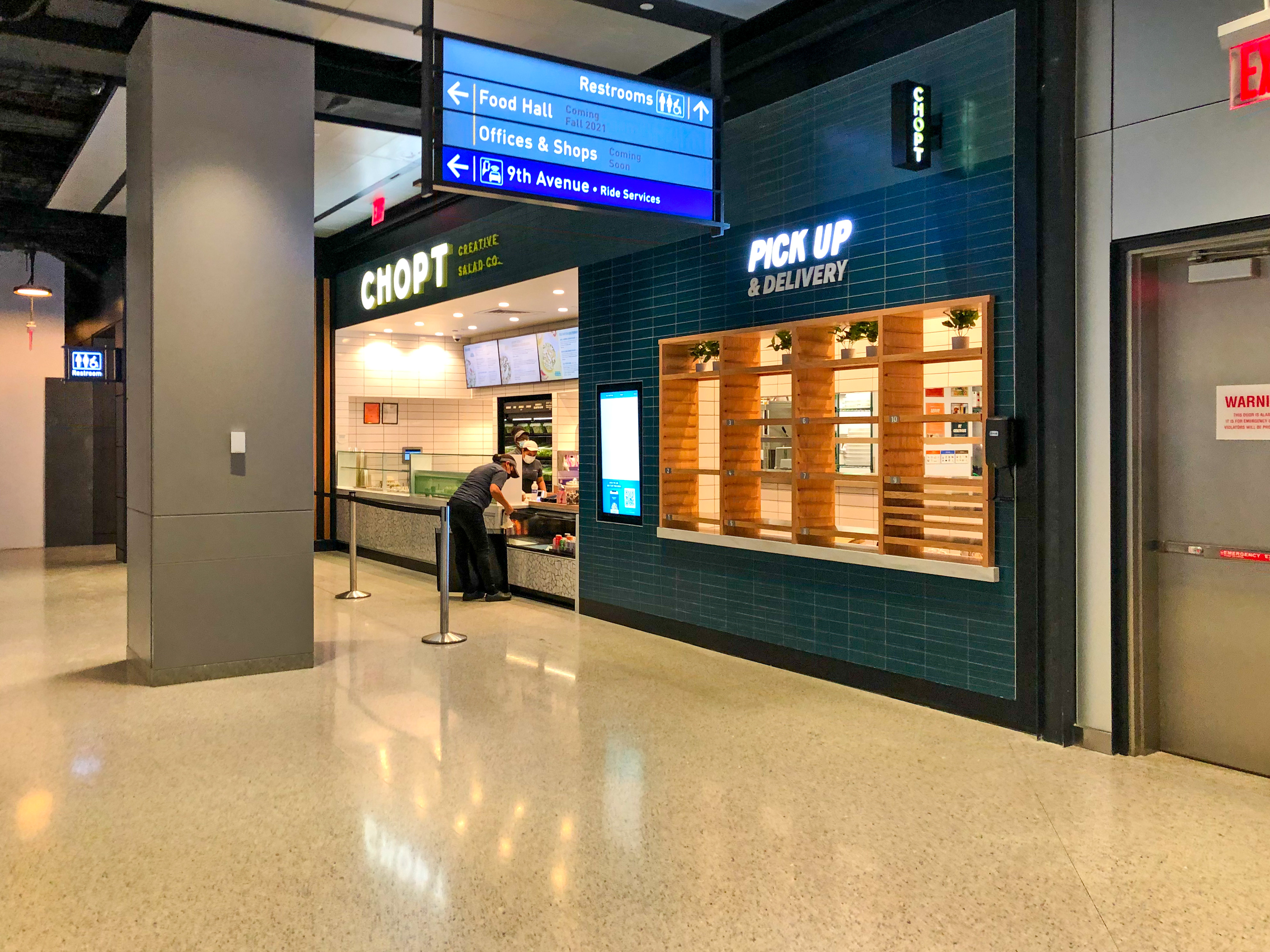
- A Chopt location at Moynihan Train Hall in New York City
- Company type: Private
- Industry: Fast Casual Dining
- Founded: 2001 (25 years ago)
- Founders: Tony Shure, Colin McCabe
- Headquarters: New York City, U.S.
- Number of locations: 70 (2024)
- Products: Salads, bowls, wraps, soups, dressings
- Parent: Founders Table Restaurant Group
- Website: choptsalad.com

Chopt Creative Salad Company, commonly referred to as Chopt, is an American chain of fast casual restaurants with over 70 locations in New York City, Washington, D.C., Maryland, Connecticut, New Jersey, Virginia, North Carolina, Georgia, and Tennessee. Founded in 2001 by Tony Shure and Colin McCabe, the company serves salads, warm grain bowls, and sandwich wraps.

The company features a selection of pre-made and customizable salads, along with a variety of dressings, grain and hot-top salads, wraps, and house-made iced teas and lemonades.

In January 2020 Chopt merged with Dos Toros Taqueria to form Founders Table Restaurant Group. Dos Toros Taqueria, started in 2009 by Leo and Oliver Kremer, is mission-style burritos and taco chain with around 20 locations mainly in New York and Washington, D.C. The venture is headed by Chopt CEO and may acquire similar a founder-led fast-casual restaurants in the future.

== Menu ==
The company offers a selection of greens, proteins, vegetables, grains, and dressings. Customers can create their own salads or choose from a variety of pre-designed options, such as the Mexican Caesar, Kebab Cobb, and Crispy Chicken Ranch. In addition to salads, Chopt serves warm grain bowls, wraps, and soups.

Chopt also has a rotating seasonal menu, which features limited-time items inspired by different cuisines and regions.

=== Food preparation ===
Customers are able to order from varied salad or salad-sandwich options, which are chopped with a mezzaluna knife before being dressed and served.
