= Vinotherapy =

Vinotherapy, also written "Vinotherapie", describes a beauty therapy process where the residue of wine making (the pips and pulp) are rubbed into the skin. The pulp is claimed to have exfoliating qualities and to help reduce the signs of ageing.

== History ==
The concept of vinotherapy was expanded by Mathilde and Bertrand Thomas. The French couple learned about the impact of grape seeds from the leading expert on grape and grapevine polyphenols Dr. Vercauteren.

In 1995, Mathilde and Bertrand launched a line of Vinothérapie skincare products made from grape derived ingredients: Caudalie.

Vinotherapie makes use of the grape and the vine extracts to provide skincare treatments, with claimed anti-ageing action. Caudalíe was the first to stabilized and patent the extraction of Grape Seed Polyphenols (OPC), and use them in dermocosmetics.

There is a "Vinothérapie" spa hotel at La Rioja in Spain.
