= Fortunoff =

Retailer of outdoor furniture and jewelry

- Industry: Retail
- Founded: 1922
- Headquarters: Uniondale, Long Island, New York
- Products: Outdoor Furniture and Jewelry
- Owner: Fortunoff family
- Website: www.fortunoff.com

Fortunoff is a New York–based retailer of outdoor furniture and jewelry.

The company started as a home, jewelry and furniture retailer founded in 1922 by Max and Clara Fortunoff. After being sold to private equity firms in 2005 and 2008, and closing all its stores following two bankruptcies in the late 2000s, the company was re-purchased by the Fortunoff and Mayrock families, who have relaunched the former outdoor furniture and jewelry categories.

Fortunoff Backyard Stores, under a license to Furniture Concepts, now operates 33 Fortunoff Backyard Stores in New York, New Jersey, Connecticut, Delaware, Pennsylvania and Virginia. Combined with its parent company in Texas, Chair King, it is believed to be the largest independent outdoor furniture dealer in the country.

Fortunoff Fine Jewelry, licensed by Esther Fortunoff, operates a single store at the Lesso Home New York in the East Garden City section of Uniondale, New York – as well as online.

== History ==
The original Fortunoff store was on Livonia Avenue in Brownsville, Brooklyn, New York. The chain's flagship store opened in 1964 in East Garden City, on Long Island, New York; it later anchored The Mall at the Source which was built around the Fortunoff store, from 1997 until Fortunoff's closing in 2009..

Fortunoff had four full-line stores in the chain. In addition to the Westbury flagship, these stores were located in White Plains, New York; Woodbridge, New Jersey; and Wayne, New Jersey. In addition, Fortunoff operated 16 specialty stores: Jewelry and fine gifts were offered at the chain's shops on 57th Street in Manhattan, which closed in February 2009, and were also offered at Fortunoff's Paramus Park Mall location. A clearance center was also operated in East Garden City, New York. Indoor and outdoor furniture were the focus of another 14 stores throughout New York, New Jersey, Connecticut and Pennsylvania; these stores were known as "Fortunoff Backyard Stores".

The following years saw Fortunoff continue to struggle, and on February 4, 2008, the chain filed for Chapter 11 bankruptcy along with accepting the $100 million sale to NRDC Equity Partners, the parent company of Lord & Taylor. The sale was estimated to include Fortunoff's debt of approximately $60 million. Industry analysts speculated that a likely result of the buyout by NRDC would bring Fortunoff-branded jewelry and home furnishings departments into most if not all of the 47 current Lord & Taylor locations. This list includes the department store's flagship Fifth Avenue location, where such holdings could exceed 100,000 square feet (9,300 m^{2}) in sales floor area—approximately one sixth of the total area of the store. The NRDC deal closed in March 2008, marking Fortunoff's exit from bankruptcy. NRDC also released statements about intentions of infusing an additional $100 million in capital to Fortunoff and expanding the chain to over 50 stores. NRDC never followed through investing the planned capital needed to rescue the brand.

In July 2008, NRDC purchased Canada's 338-year-old retailer, the Hudson's Bay Company. The new combined company called Hudson's Bay Trading Company was composed of Fortunoff, Lord & Taylor, Creative Design Studios, and the HBC's divisions: the Bay, Zellers, Home Outfitters, and Fields.

=== Liquidation ===
On February 5, 2009, Fortunoff filed for Chapter 11 bankruptcy for the second time in a year, citing a weak 2008 holiday season, ballooning costs in its partnership with Lord & Taylor and reduced borrowing capacity due to the recession. Officials at Fortunoff originally hoped to sell the luxury-goods chain. Finding no takers, layoffs began on February 12, 2009, at the Fortunoff headquarters in Uniondale, New York. A class-action lawsuit against Fortunoff was filed by laid-off employees who alleged violations for federal and state WARN Act laws. It was further alleged that many of Fortunoff's vendors were lured into shipping increased consignments of merchandise and goods for the Fortunoff/Lord & Taylor venture prior to the abrupt bankruptcy filing one year and a day after NRDC's purchase of the company. The timing of the filing allowed NRDC's Fortunoff "shell" companies, created during the initial purchase, a secured creditor position above other creditors.

On February 17, 2009, Fortunoff stopped accepting its gift cards as payment, angering customers. A bankruptcy auction was scheduled for February 23, 2009.

The chain began liquidating all of its stores on February 25, 2009; the sales concluded a little more than three months later in the first week of June 2009. When the company was in process of being liquidated, plans to brand Lord & Taylor's fine jewelry and home-furnishing departments under the Fortunoff brand were canceled. SimplexDiam Inc. of New York City was entrusted with auctioning the residual diamonds from the fine jewelry division.

=== Relaunch ===
In July 2009, the descendants of Max and Clara Fortunoff reacquired the intellectual property and website.

In September 2009, the company reached an agreement with Furniture Concepts, LLC allowing Furniture Concepts to sell Fortunoff-branded outdoor furniture. As part of this agreement, Furniture Concepts reopened the chain's former Backyard Store unit. As of 2018, Furniture Concepts operates Fortunoff Backyard Stores in New York, New Jersey, Connecticut, Delaware, Pennsylvania and Virginia.

In 2010, Esther Fortunoff launched fine jewelry online, followed by a retail store in 2014 near the site of the former location at the Mall at the Source.

Fortunoff now continues to do business as an online jewelry retailer and operates its Fortunoff Backyard Stores.

== Ownership ==
The Fortunoff and Mayrock families, descendants of the founders, owned 100% of the company until November 2004, when a 75% interest in the company was acquired by Trimaran Capital Partners and the Kier Group. However, several members of the founding family remained involved in the management and operation of the company. The sale, which originally was to have closed in December 2004, eventually closed in July 2005.

During the spring of 2009, CONSOR Intellectual Asset Management was retained to sell the Fortunoff brand, intellectual property and related intangible assets. As a result of that effort, in July 2009, the Fortunoff brand and intellectual property were reacquired by David Fortunoff and members of the Fortunoff and Mayrock families with the possibility of relaunching the brand.
