= Samanea New York =

Shopping mall in East Garden City, New York

Samanea New York Mall
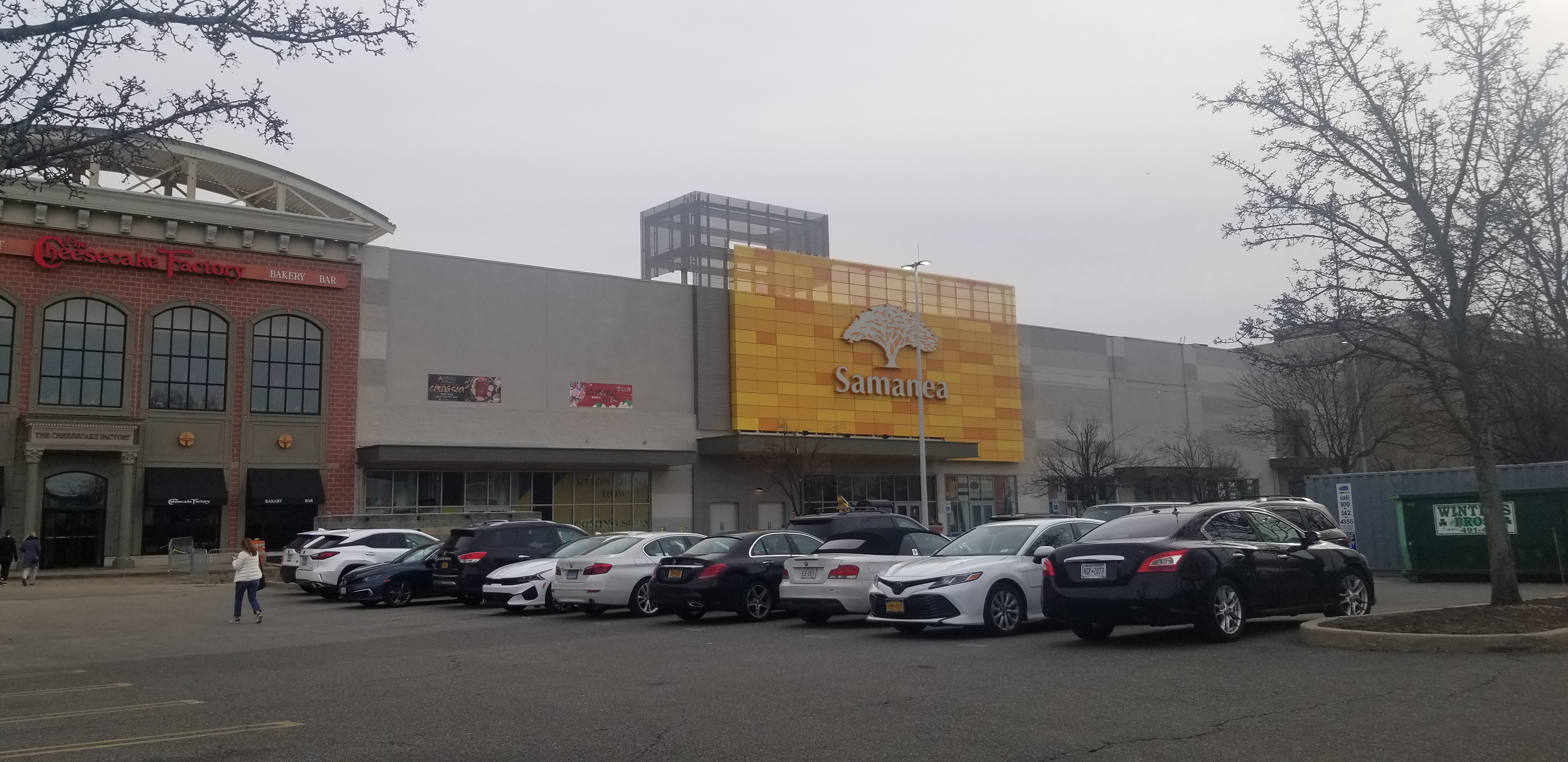
- The mall in 2022, as seen from the parking lot
- Coordinates: 40.7447°N 73.5948°W
- Address: 1504 Old Country Road, Westbury, New York, U.S.
- Opened: September 5, 1997 (as Mall at the Source)
- Previous names: Mall at the Source
- Developer: Simon DeBartolo Group
- Owner: Lesso Mall Development Long Island Inc.
- Num. of anchor tenants: 1
- Floors: 2
- Website: exploresamanea.com

Samanea New York Mall is a mixed-use development center located in East Garden City, New York, United States, on Old Country Road and Merchants Concourse (Ellison Avenue).

It is owned by Lesso Mall Development Long Island Inc. The center is being built inside the mostly unoccupied Mall at the Source, which was named for its former anchor store Fortunoff (advertised as "The Source") that operated until June 2009.

The mall opened in 1997, under the management of Simon Property Group. With the 2009 closures of Fortunoff, Steve & Barry's, and Circuit City, three large anchor stores had become vacant. The drop of foot traffic by the loss of the anchors caused other stores – the three aforementioned sub-anchor chains, plus Saks Off 5th, and Forever 21 – and the entire food court, including McDonald's, Starbucks, and Ranch 1 – to leave the mall.

Simon Property Group and unnamed co-owners of the Mall at the Source defaulted on a $124 million interest-only balloon payment mortgage in March 2009. It was purchased by a European pension fund in August 2012 and auctioned. In November 2016, it was announced that the Mall at the Source would be sold and could be demolished to make way for a new mixed-use development.

In May 2017, Lesso Mall Development Long Island Inc. – a subsidiary of the Hong Kong-listed LESSO Group – purchased the mall for $92 million. On October 21, 2017, it was announced that the Mall at the Source would be redeveloped into a decoration hub for Lesso Home, which was originally scheduled to open in the fall of 2018, but has been delayed. A few retailers, The Cheesecake Factory, Dave & Buster's, and a Fortunoff outdoor furniture and jewelry store have remained open during renovations.

== History ==
=== Proposal and construction (1964–1997) ===
Roosevelt Raceway bought the property when it expanded the harness-racing track in the 1940s for additional parking. In the early 1960s, Ohrbach's constructed a department store on leased land at north-east corner of the raceway's property. Fortunoff built its store several years later in 1964, as Fortunoff followed its customers east from the original Fortunoff location in Brooklyn. Alan Fortunoff bought the entire property north of the current boundary of Transverse Drive from Roosevelt Raceway in the early 1980s.

In the late 1980s, Alan Fortunoff planned to construct the Long Island Galleria shopping mall, one comparable to the size of the massive Roosevelt Field Mall a few miles away but with different stores. It was to be built by the Westfield Group and include Neiman Marcus and Nordstrom as anchor stores. Community pressure over congestion concerns forced Fortunoff to scale back the size and scope of the mall. Roughly half of the property was sold to Price Club (now Costco), which developed its portion to include a Kmart (now Walmart). The mall was instead built by Simon Property Group, and they continued to manage and co-own the mall until August 2012.

=== The Mall at the Source (1997–2017) ===
The mall was the first on Long Island to house clothing chains H&M, Old Navy, Nordstrom Rack, and Saks Off 5th. It was also the first to house restaurants, including The Cheesecake Factory, Dave & Buster's, P.F. Chang's China Bistro, and Rainforest Cafe (closed on October 19, 2000). The Mall at the Source is also adjacent to many other shopping complexes and restaurants.

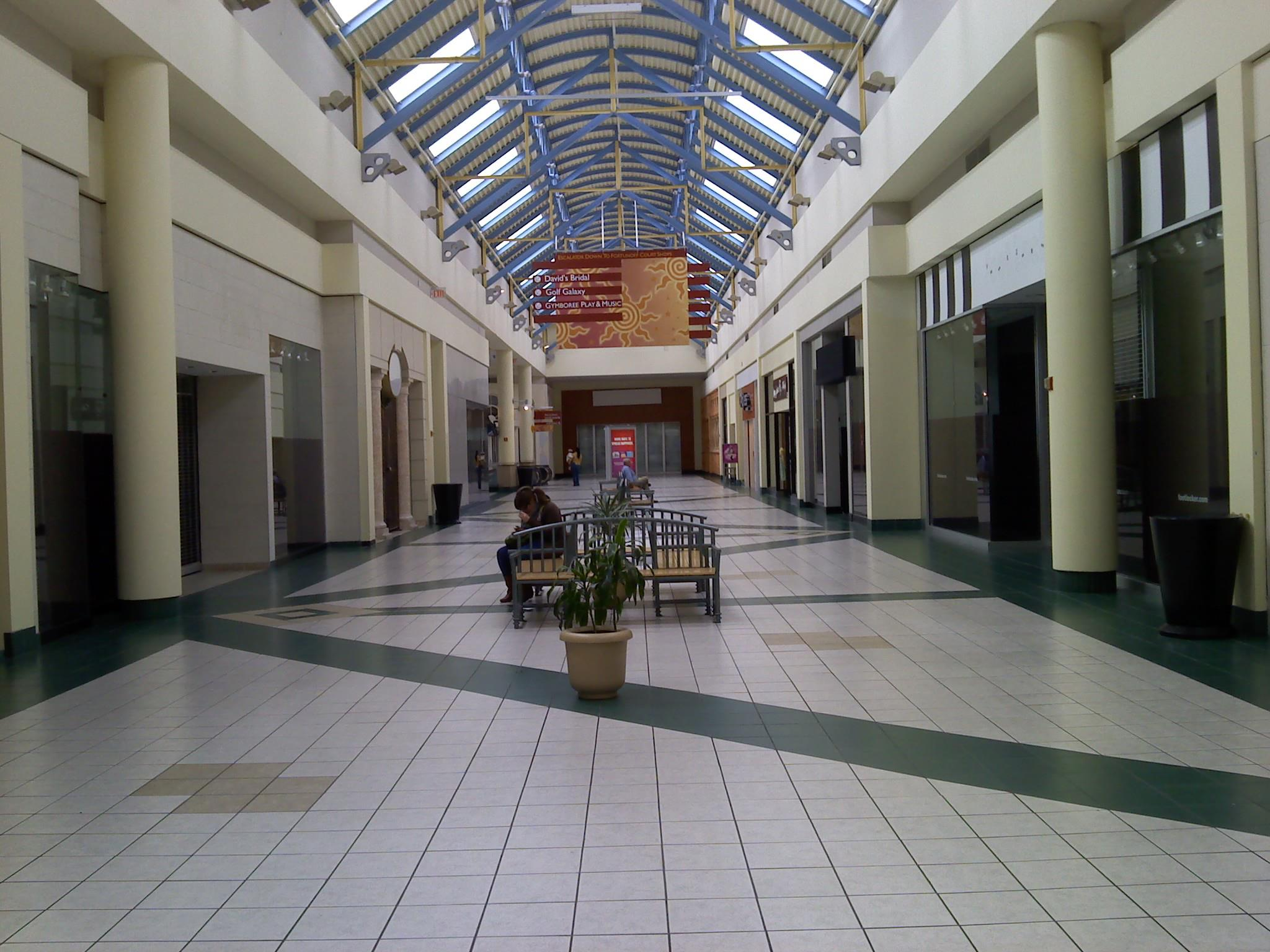
Many of the mall's tenants left after the closure of the anchor stores.

In 2009, all three anchor stores – Fortunoff, Steve & Barry's, and Circuit City – closed crippling foot traffic and resulting in a steady abandonment by its remaining tenants (outside of its restaurants, which maintained their standalone customers).

On August 9, 2012, it was announced that the property was to go up for auction by the end of the month; by then, the mall was under fifty percent occupancy. The opening of the nearby Gallery at Westbury Plaza in late 2012 prompted Nordstrom Rack, Old Navy, and Saks Off 5th to move away, leaving the future of the mall uncertain. On August 28, an auction was held, but was unsuccessful in attracting buyers. Lenders then took ownership of the mall, and Newmark Grubb Knight Frank was hired for management.

In 2013, a Lord & Taylor outlet store and the Jewelry Emporium and Mall opened in the former Nordstrom Rack and Off 5th, respectively. However, these stores failed to increase foot traffic at the mall, and the vacancy rate continued to increase.

In 2014, Dick's Sporting Goods closed a substantial portion of its Golf Galaxy stores, including its store in the Mall at the Source. David's Bridal moved to the nearby Roosevelt Raceway Shopping Center in June 2015, leaving the Fortunoff court almost completely vacant.

=== Lesso Home New York Market (since 2018) ===
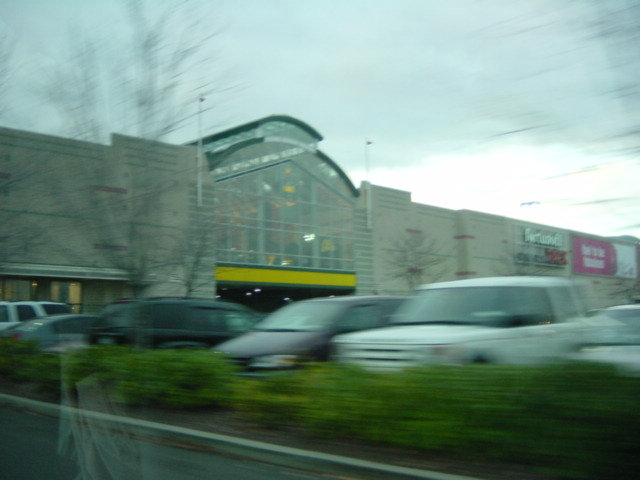
The Off 5th Saks Court

In May 2017, Lesso Mall Development Long Island Inc. (a subsidiary of the Hong Kong-listed LESSO Group) purchased the mall for $92 million. On October 21, 2017, it was announced that the Mall at the Source would be redeveloped into a Decor Hub for Lesso Home; redevelopment had been originally scheduled to be completed by the fall of 2018, but has since been delayed. It will include showrooms for many manufacturers for home furnishings, decor, and walkable markets. The format will be much similar to the Italy-based Eataly.

The firm aims to rebuild the long-ailing retail center as a home-furnishings marketplace for design professionals, contractors and retail buyers. There have been plans to include food and entertainment components for local shoppers.

== See also ==
- List of shopping malls in New York (state)
- The Shops at Sunvet
