= Beef-A-Roo =

American fast casual restaurant chain

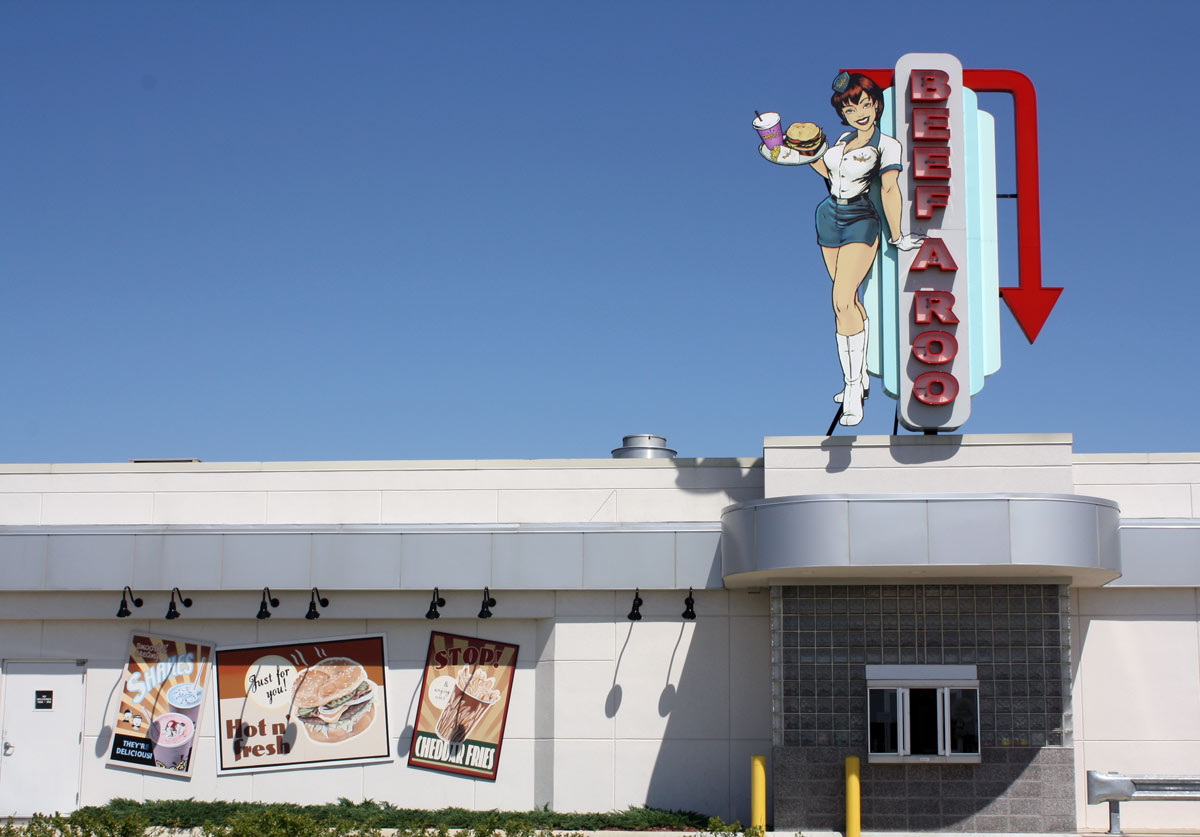
- Beef-A-Roo in northern Illinois
- Industry: Fast food
- Founded: 1967; 59 years ago
- Founder: Dave Debruler; Jean Vitale
- Number of locations: c. 20 restaurants (2024)
- Website: beefaroo.com

Beef-A-Roo is a franchised chain of fast casual restaurants founded in Rockford, Illinois by Dave Debruler and Jean Vitale.

== Description ==
The chain's mascot is the Beef-A-Roo Buckaroo. Each store has a different theme. Many of its original locations had 1950s decor based on themes like log cabins, fire stations, train stations, and diners. Other stores have "comfort" themes featuring fireplaces and couches.

=== Menu ===
The menu features burgers, roast beef sandwiches, salads, soups, wraps, desserts, and milkshakes. It is known for serving cheddar fries and loaded fries as a side. The chain experimented with serving breakfast, but stopped in January 2025.

== History ==
The first Beef-A-Roo restaurant was opened in Rockford, Illinois, by Dave Debruler and Jean Vitaler in 1967. It served roast beef and ham sandwiches and potato chips. By the 1980s, the restaurant's menu had expanded to include a salad bar, hamburgers and other items. In 2007, Debruler and Vitale sold the restaurant to their children, including daughter Melissa Pratt. It was owned by their family until 2019 when they sold the chain to a larger company; it is now a franchise restaurant. In 2021, its franchising rights were sold to NEXT Brands and Development. In 2022, the chain planned to open 50 stores.

The chain hastened its expansion by using shipping containers to fabricate restaurants in several states. These modular stores cost only $200,000 to construct and required only three or four employees to operate. It has also opened restaurants in several closed Hardee's locations.

As of April 2024 the chain had about twenty restaurants in six states outside Illinois, including Arkansas, Indiana, Kansas, Michigan, Missouri, and Texas.

The company ran an advertising campaign with NASCAR driver Noah Gragson and Front Row Motorsports in 2025.

== Controversy ==
=== Sudden Closure of Rockford Locations (April 2026) ===
On April 23rd, eight Illinois locations closed in Rockford, Machesney Park, Loves Park, and Roscoe due to an issue with the Illinois Department of Revenue, claiming a expired business certificate of registration. A local Belvidere snowplow company and Harlem School District cited allegations of the business not paying out funds for snow plowing at the eight locations, as well as checks beginning to bounce back after attempting to be deposited from company sponsored fundraisers.

=== Employee Pay Issues and More Closures (June/July 2026) ===
Months after the previous issues, employees at Beef-a-Roo locations noticed they were not getting paid, claiming that they were supposed to be paid on June 25, with the company claiming that they would be paid by June 30, but remain being unpaid as of July 6.

Seven more locations would close temporality in the month of July including nationwide locations in Missouri, Indiana, Kansas, and Arkansas with no reopening timeline currently planned for affected locations. As of July 8, 2026, the restaurant's website was shut down, leading to further speculation about the chain's fate.
