= Mendocino Farms =

American sandwich and salad restaurant chain

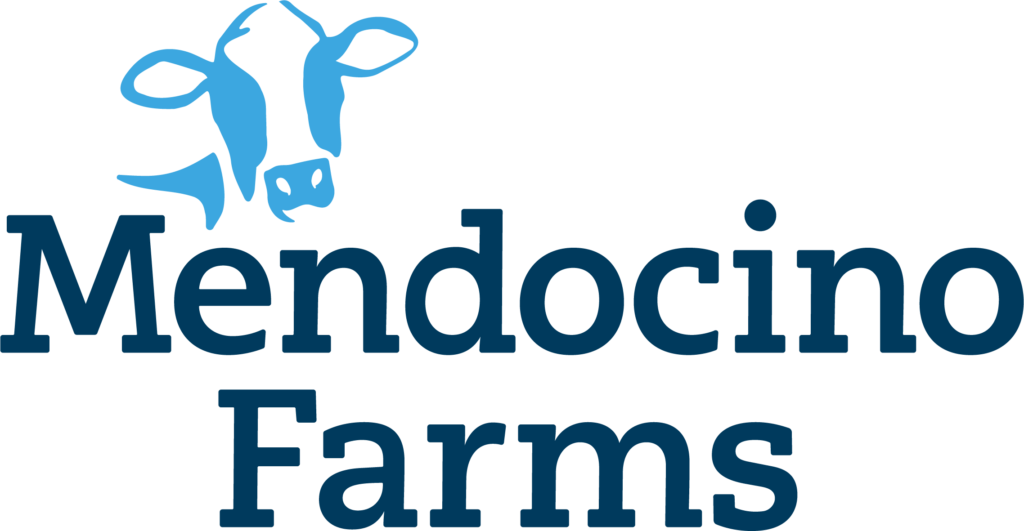

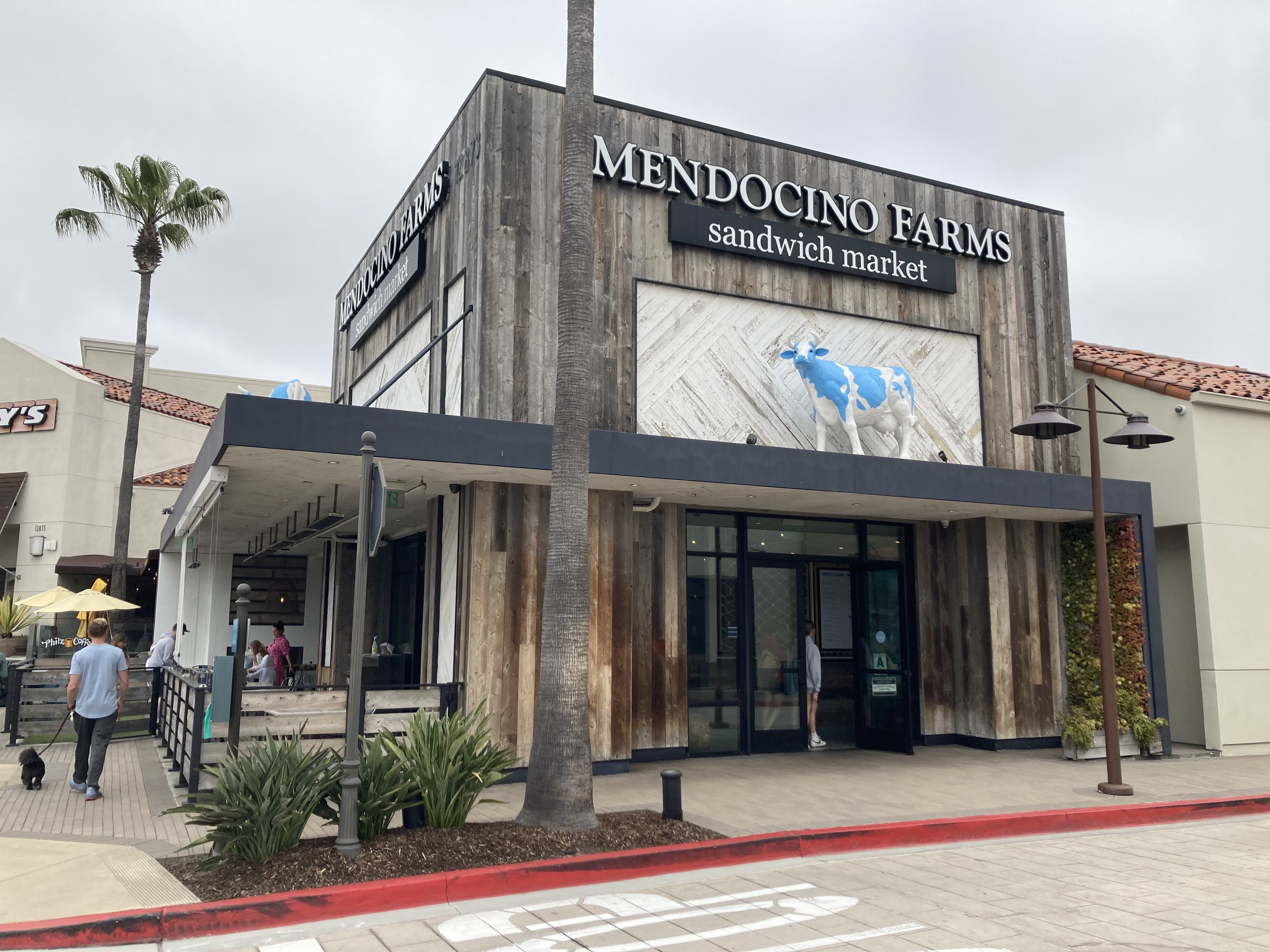
- A location at Del Mar, California
- Formerly: Mendocino Farms Sandwich Market
- Type: Privately held company
- Industry: Food and Beverage
- Founded: 2005; 21 years ago in Los Angeles, California
- Founders: Mario Del Pero; Ellen Chen-Del Pero
- Headquarters: Los Angeles, United States
- Number of locations: 80+ (16 upcoming) (2025)
- Area served: Arizona; California; Colorado; Illinois; Texas; Washington
- Key people: Harald Herrmann (CEO) (2017–present)
- Brands: Blue Cow Kitchen
- Revenue: $1.6 million (2006)
- Owner: TPG Inc.
- Website: www.mendocinofarms.com

Mendocino Farms, colloquially shortened to Mendo, and formerly Mendocino Farms Sandwich Market, is a fast casual restaurant chain based in the Western United States mainly selling sandwiches and salads. Private equity firm TPG Inc. holds a majority stake in the company.

The restaurants themselves are mainly designed by John Kim, who uses eco-friendly materials to create a country aesthetic.

== History ==
The first restaurant was opened in 2005, by the couple Mario Del Pero and Ellen Chen-Del Pero. Del Pero grew up in Marysville, California, where his father owned a century-old meat company. After graduating from USC, he decided to start his own food concept. After interviewing people in the industry, Del Pero started working at Sharkeez in Newport Beach, California, which was founded by his best friend's father. In 1998, he then opened Skew's, a teriyaki restaurant. After growing it to three locations, Del Pero and his wife sold it in 2001 and used the assets to create Mendocino Farms. The first location was in an unpopular 900 square feet (84 m^{2}) area below the Museum of Contemporary Art, Los Angeles. Starbucks, the previous owner of the property, had bailed on the location.

In 2010, the company made a deal with the firm L Catterton to help with expansion. It then became an important investor. Whole Foods Market made a minor investment in the restaurant as well, and the first Mendocino Farms inside a Whole Foods opened in 2016, although Chen-Del Pero stated that they were strategically choosing locations. TPG Inc. bought a majority stake in the chain from Catterton in 2017. The former CEO of Yard House, Harald Herrmann, was appointed as CEO after the exchange.

== Menu ==
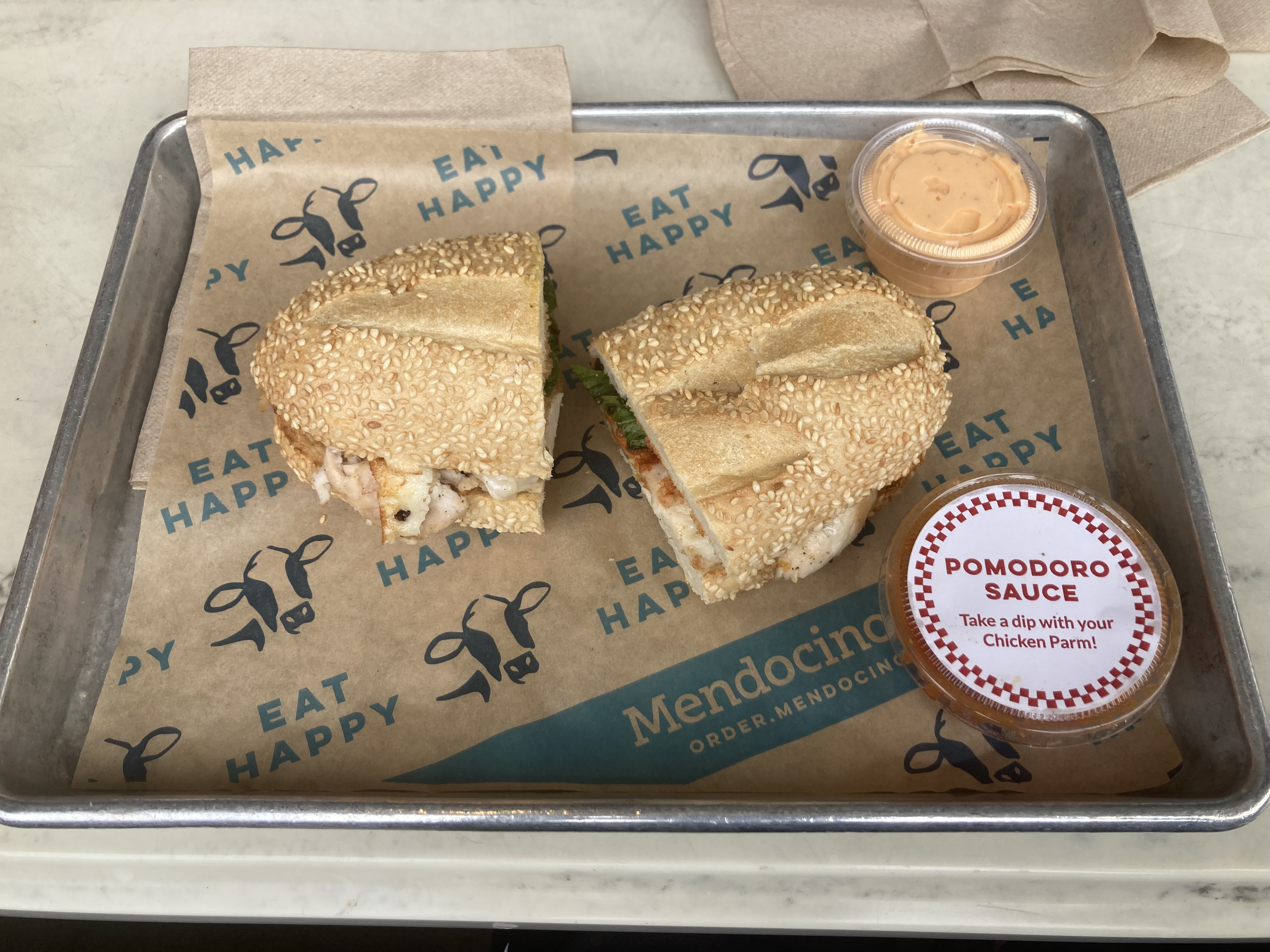
A Chicken Parm Dip

Mendocino Farms consistently changes its menu every six to eight weeks, but popular items include:

- "Not So Fried" Chicken – "Shaved, roasted chicken breast topped with Mendo's krispies, herb aioli, mustard pickle slaw, tomatoes, pickled red onions on toasted ciabatta with a side of tangy mustard barbeque sauce or mustard pickle remoulade"
- Chimichurri Steak & Bacon – "Roasted, carved steak and applewood smoked bacon topped with marinated red peppers, caramelized onion jam, chimichurri, shredded romaine, herb aioli on a toasted sesame roll"
- Vegan Banh Mi – "Organic marinated, baked tofu with vegan aioli, sweet chili sauce, pickled daikon & carrots, cucumbers, jalapeños, Thai basil, cilantro on panini-pressed ciabatta"
- Pink Lady Beets & Goat Cheese Salad – "Shaved, roasted chicken breast, honey and herb marinated goat cheese, pink lady beets, green apples, dried cranberries, crushed honey roasted almonds, red onions, mixed greens, chopped romaine with citrus vinaigrette"
- Peruvian Steak – "Spicy aji amarillo marinated steak with Oaxacan cheese, herb aioli, red onions, tomatoes, shredded romaine on a toasted potato roll"
- Chicken Parm Dip – "Shaved, roasted chicken breast, Mendo’s krispies, melted mozzarella and Grana Padano cheeses, pomodoro sauce, Italian basil, Calabrian chili aioli on a toasted sesame roll served with an extra side of pomodoro sauce for dipping"

A kid's menu is also offered.

== Locations ==
In California, the chain mainly centers around the population centers of Los Angeles, Orange County, San Diego, Sacramento, and San Francisco.

As of 2024, its locations in Texas are found in Houston and the Dallas-Fort Worth metroplex. As of 2026, Washington eateries are only in the Seattle area. Locations also exist in the Phoenix and Chicago areas.

== Reception ==
The company was included in Nation's Restaurant News' 2013 50 Hottest Emerging Concepts. The founders, Mario Del Pero and Ellen Chen-Del Pero were also featured in the website's Power List 2016.
