= Mixt Greens =

Restaurant information
- Location: California, United States

MIXT (previously Mixt Greens) is a fast-casual restaurant that specializes in chef-crafted salads, grain bowls, market plates and sandwiches sourced from local and organic ingredients. The company was founded in 2005 in San Francisco by Andrew Swallow, a fine dining chef and cookbook author, his sister Leslie Silverglide, an entrepreneur with a master's degree in sustainability; and her husband David Silverglide, a technology executive.

In 2009, MIXT was acquired by an international private equity firm Inventages, a life-sciences, nutrition and wellness-focused venture capital fund formed with the support of Nestlé. In 2012, the company was re-acquired by founders David and Leslie Silverglide, with plans to expand the concept nationwide. In 2016, the company renamed the concept 'MIXT,' dropping the 'Greens'. As of 2022, MIXT operates 14 locations across California, and Texas.
