= Mall walking =

Form of exercise taken in shopping malls

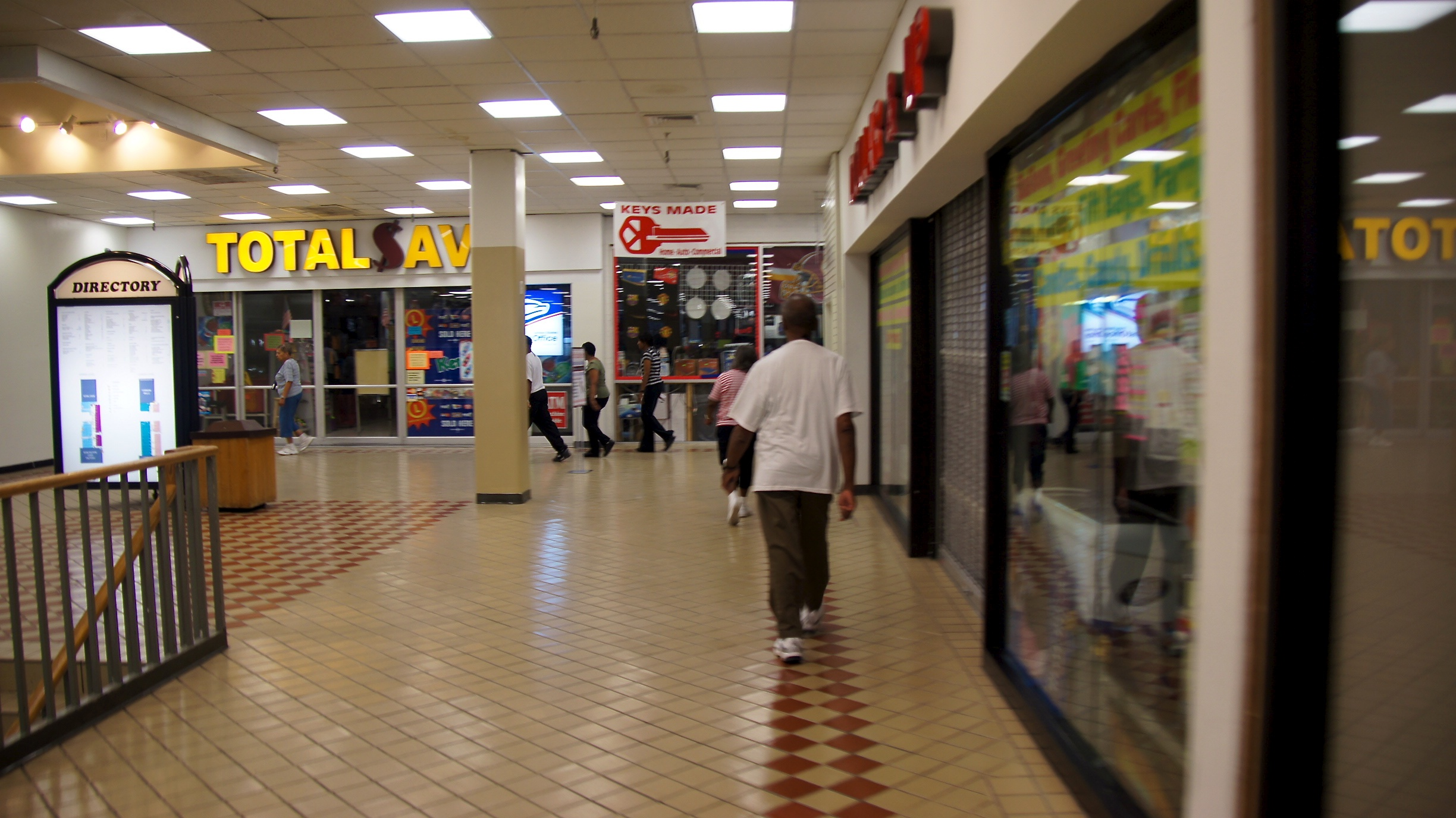
A group of mall walkers in The Shops at Iverson in Maryland, in 2011

Mall walking is a form of exercise in which people walk or jog through the usually long corridors of shopping malls as a substitute for a running track or other walking venue. Many malls open early so that people may mall walk; stores and other such facilities generally do not open at this time, though vending machine concessions are available. Many choose to mall walk as the indoor climate is comfortable, secure, and there is easy access to amenities, such as benches, toilets, Wi-Fi for fitness tracking, media access, and water fountains. Others are attracted to mall walking strictly for the opportunity to watch others. Clean and level surfaces also provide a safe walking environment.

Mall walking is undertaken individually, in groups, or as part of an organized mall walking program. Mall walking in the United States is especially popular amongst senior citizens. Many mall walkers cite the camaraderie of walking in groups.

== In popular culture ==
Mall walking was featured in the television show Better Call Saul in season 3, episode 9, entitled "Fall".
