= KeepCup =

Australian reusable drinkware company

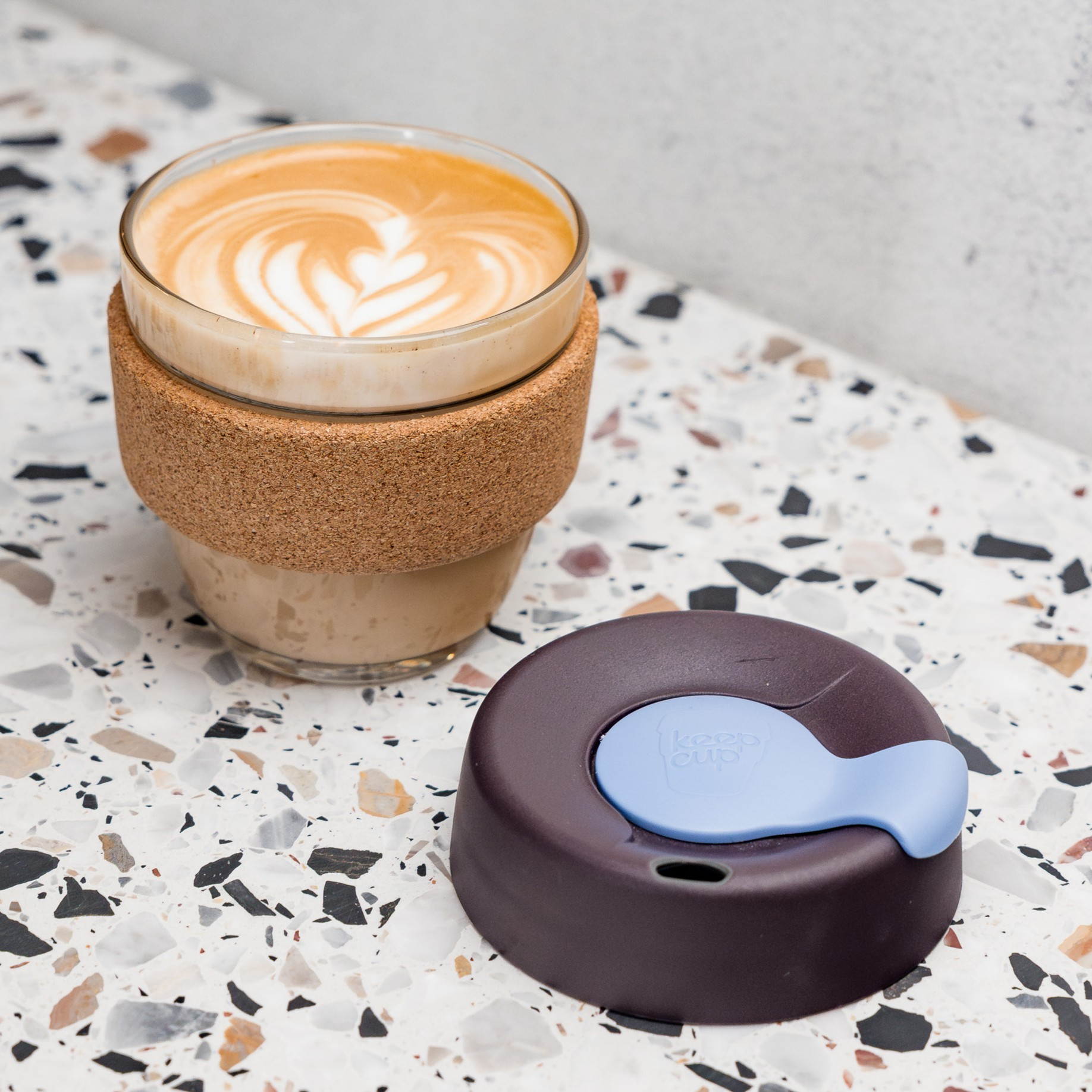
KeepCup Brew Cork Reusable Coffee Cup

KeepCup is an Australian company that manufactures reusable drinkware designed for coffee, tea and cold beverages. Established in 2009 and headquartered in Melbourne, the company is recognized for producing one of the first widely adopted barista-standard reusable coffee cups and driving the reuse movement in the 2010s. KeepCup products have been used in consumer waste-reduction campaigns, hospitality programs and workplace sustainability initiatives.

== History ==
KeepCup was founded by siblings Abigail and Jamie Forsyth, who operated a café business in Melbourne prior to launching the brand. Observing the volume of disposable cups used in their stores, they developed a reusable cup compatible with espresso machines and efficient café service.

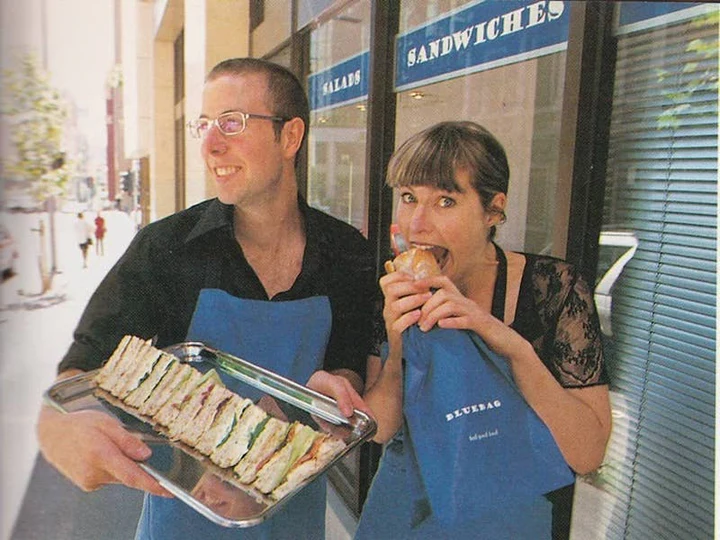
KeepCup Founders: Abigail and Jamie Forsyth

The first KeepCup products were released in 2009 following a period of prototyping and local manufacturing. The company expanded internationally through partnerships with distributors, cafés, and sustainability initiatives within organisations. By the late 2010s, KeepCup products were sold throughout Australia, Europe, North America and parts of Asia.

KeepCup has offices and warehousing in Australia, the United Kingdom and the United States and retail stockists throughout the world.

In 2024, co-founder Abigail Forsyth received the Member of the Order of Australia (OAM) honour in recognition of her contributions to sustainability and waste-reduction initiatives.

== KeepCup products ==
KeepCup produces several ranges of reusable drinkware made from glass, stainless steel, recycled materials and plastics. Product lines include:

=== Reusable cups ===
The first KeepCup design, manufactured from polypropylene, was designed to replicate the form and function of a single-use takeaway cup and fit under commercial espresso machines. KeepCup states that approximately twenty disposable plastic cup lids contain the equivalent amount of plastic used in one Original KeepCup.

Launched in 2014, Brew Cork is a tempered glass reusable cup featuring a natural recovered cork band. It became emblematic of the conscious consumerism movement.

=== Commuter travel mug ===
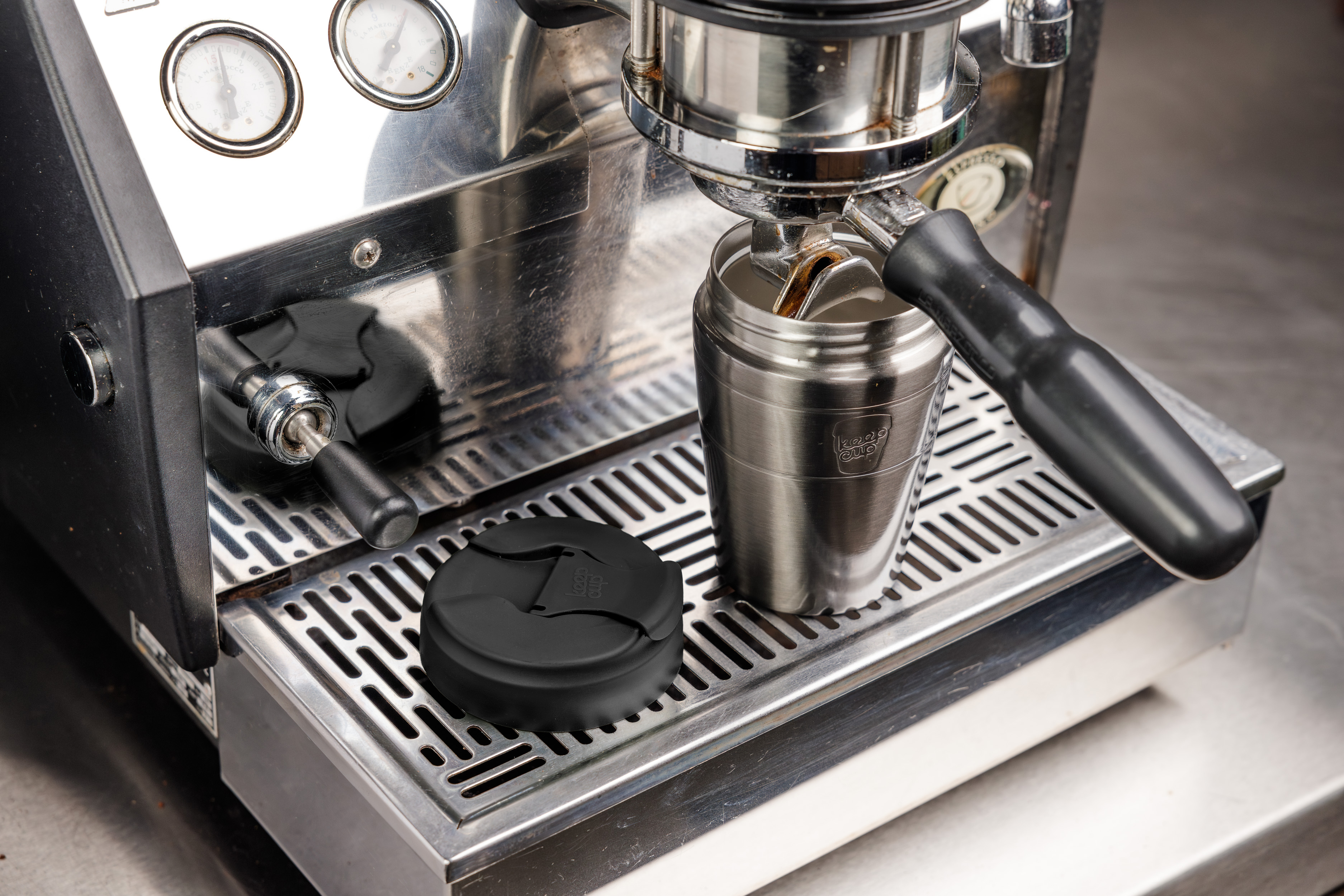
KeepCup Commuter Reusable Coffee Cup in Nitro Black.

In 2020, KeepCup released a vacuum-insulated stainless-steel range designed to maintain beverage temperature and withstand repeated daily use. Since 2024, all stainless-steel products have been manufactured using 95% recycled stainless steel and are lead-free. This range is called the Commuter and can be modular and interchangeable with a Helix straw lid and bottle lid.

=== Helix modular reuse system ===
The Helix system is a modular design platform allowing cups and bottles to share interchangeable components, enabling reuse and repair of individual parts. Screw-fit bases can attach bottle lids, leak-resistant sipper lids and straw lids. In 2022 the KeepCup Helix range won the Australian Good Design Award for functionality and aesthetics.

== Sustainability ==
Academic and media analyses have described KeepCup as a notable contributor to the early reusable-cup movement in Australia. One study reported a significant sales increase following the ABC television program War on Waste, highlighting the brand’s role in public engagement with reuse.

KeepCup has been referenced in policy discussions on single-use cup bans, behaviour change and sustainable consumption. Peer-reviewed studies have examined consumer reuse behaviour, while life-cycle assessments (LCAs) commissioned by KeepCup in 2010, 2018 and 2023 compare environmental impacts across materials. Independent LCA summaries report that reusable cups generally have a lower impact than single-use disposables after repeated use, with break-even points typically ranging from around 8 to 60 uses depending on material and washing assumptions.

KeepCup uses materials such as recycled stainless steel, Tritan Renew and natural cork, and participates in reuse-oriented accreditation and charity programs. The company became a founding member of B Corporation Australia in 2014 and has contributed to conservation and environmental organisations including Sea Shepherd and the Bob Brown Foundation.

KeepCup products are designed to be repairable, with replacement parts available to extend product lifespan.

== Cultural impact ==
KeepCup and its co-founder Abigail Forsyth have been the subject of international media coverage in outlets including the Financial Times, The Guardian, specialty-coffee publication Sprudge, design magazine Habitus Living and long-form journal Dumbo Feather, which have highlighted the company’s role in promoting reuse, its design-led approach and its influence on contemporary coffee culture.

== Accolades ==
A 2025 comparative test by The Guardian named the KeepCup Commuter the “best travel mug overall”, noting its insulation performance, secure flip-lid and barista-compatible design.

User reviews on independent consumer platforms cite mixed reviews, however most praise the durability, ease of cleaning and long product lifespan for KeepCup’s glass and steel ranges.

== See also ==
- Reusable packaging
- Circular economy
- Waste minimisation
- Single-use plastics
