= Dig Inn =

American restaurant chain

Coordinates: 40.715707°N 73.959015°W

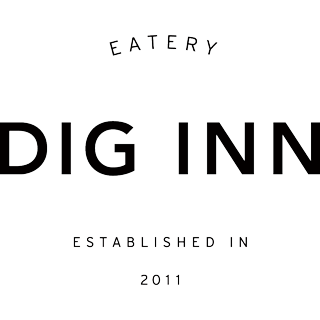
- Type: Private
- Industry: Fast Casual
- Founded: 2011; 15 years ago New York City, US
- Founder: R. Adam Eskin
- Headquarters: New York City, New York, U.S.
- Number of locations: 36 stores (October 2025)
- Area served: New York, Massachusetts, Connecticut, New Jersey, Pennsylvania, Maryland, Virginia
- Products: Customizable food bowls with scratch-cooked, locally sourced ingredients
- Website: www.diginn.com

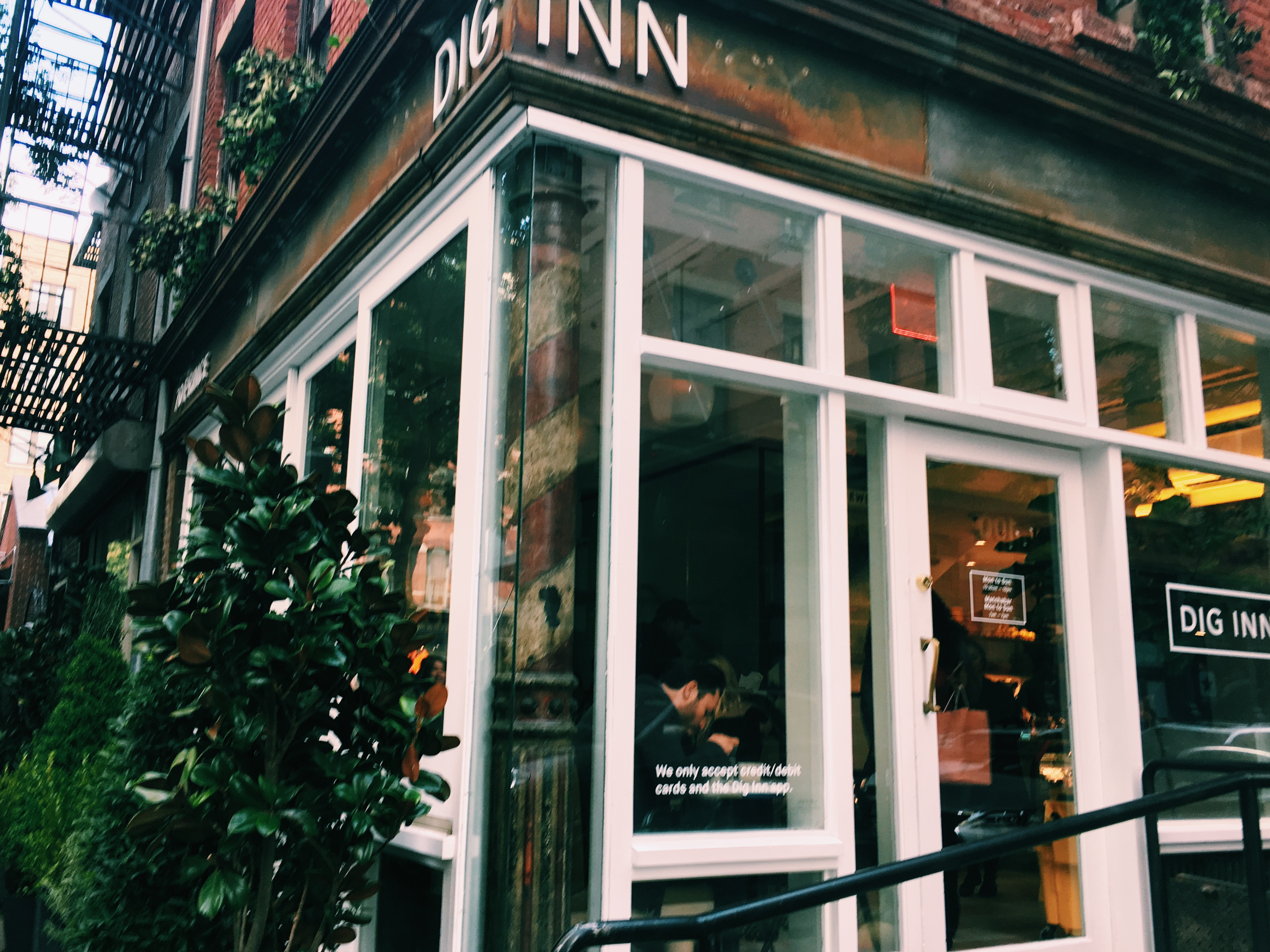
Dig Inn Store Front In New York, New York (on Crosby & Prince Street)

Dig Inn (Dig from 2019 to 2025) is an American chain of locally farm sourced restaurants, founded in 2011 by Adam Eskin in New York City.

Dig Inn positions itself between fast casual and health-conscious dining. It has been compared to fast-casual bowl or salad chains (e.g. Chipotle-style ordering lines) with a stronger focus on sustainability and locally sourced produce as well as "scratch cooking".

As of October 2025, the chain had 36 restaurants, including in two New York City boroughs (Manhattan and Brooklyn), Rye Brook in Westchester County, New York; Stamford, Connecticut; Bridgewater, New Jersey; Philadelphia, Pennsylvania; Boston, Massachusetts; Bethesda, Maryland; Ashburn, Virginia and Washington, D.C. In 2025, two opened in the Philadelphia suburbs of Ardmore and Jenkintown in Montgomery County, Pennsylvania.

The company offers dine-in, pickup, delivery, and catering.

== History ==
The company received $21.5 million in early funding rounds, then $30 million in Series D funding. The main investors were Monogram Capital Partners and Bill Allen (former CEO of OSI Restaurant Partners).

In January 2019, the company introduced a delivery service, Room Service, in some parts of downtown Manhattan.

In April 2019, the company announced a $20 million round of financing, including $15 million from Danny Meyer’s investment group Enlightened Hospitality Investments. It had plans to open its first full-service, sit-down restaurant in New York's West Village. Also in 2019, the company opened its first Philadelphia location and in July, rebranded as "Dig", in part to reflect ambitions beyond restaurants.

In June 2025, Dig announced it was reverting to "Dig Inn", citing customer feedback and brand identity. That same month, they partnered with Cyrus Veyssi to create a Sumac Yogurt and Chicken dish: a percentage of the profits went to NYC Pride March.

== Reception ==
Dig was named the best fast casual restaurant of 2017 by Boston magazine.

Dig Inn was one of Fast Company's 2025 Top 100 Innovative Companies.
