= Mission BBQ =

American restaurant chain specializing in barbecue

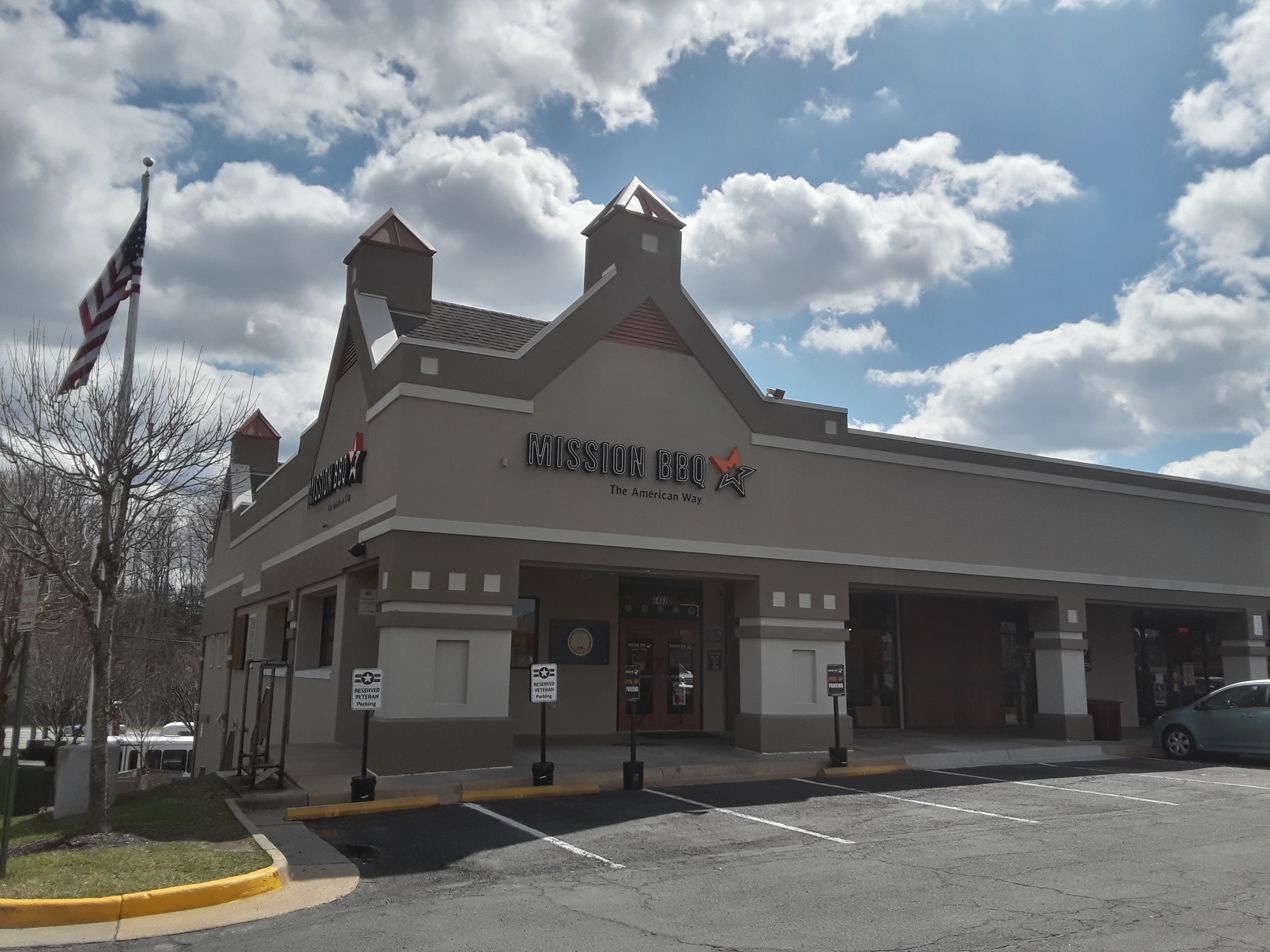
- Mission BBQ in Fairfax County, Virginia
- Type: Private
- Industry: Restaurants
- Genre: Fast casual
- Founded: September 11, 2011; 14 years ago in Glen Burnie, Maryland
- Founders: Bill Kraus; Steve Newton
- Headquarters: Glen Burnie, Maryland, United States
- Number of locations: 155 (2026)
- Area served: East Coast, Midwestern United States
- Key people: Steve Newton (Co-founder, CEO)
- Products: Various types of barbecue
- Number of employees: 7,000+
- Website: www.mission-bbq.com

Mission BBQ (stylized as MISSION BBQ) is an American barbecue restaurant chain based in Glen Burnie, Maryland. Bill Kraus and Steve Newton opened the first location on September 11, 2011, as a way to support the military, police, firefighters, and first responders.

== History and ownership ==
Mission BBQ was founded by Bill Kraus, a retired Under Armour marketing executive, and Steve "Newt" Newton, a former regional vice president with Outback Steakhouse. The two met through their Ellicott City parish shortly after Kraus moved to Maryland in 2001. Neither Kraus nor Newton are military veterans, though Kraus's father, grandfather, and two sons served in the U.S. military.

Kraus and Newton decided to start a company together after the former's two sons joined the military in 2008, eventually choosing to start a barbecue restaurant. After touring barbecue restaurants throughout the southern United States, they came up with the idea for a restaurant that would combine the all-American flavors of Fourth of July celebrations and backyard barbecues with a focus on supporting first responders and service members.

Kraus and Newton opened the first Mission BBQ in Glen Burnie, Maryland, on the tenth anniversary of the September 11, 2001 terror attacks. The first restaurant served pulled pork, with the chain's menu expanding to include brisket, chicken, turkey, sausage, and salmon as the company grew. A second location in Perry Hall, Maryland, was opened in November 2012. Mission BBQ grew to 41 locations with 11 states by 2017, The chain continued to grow steadily in the following years, with the company planning an expansion strategy of 20 to 25 new locations a year, all privately owned and financed through M&T Bank and Goldman Sachs. Mission BBQ opened its 100th location in Springfield, Illinois, in January 2021.

In September 2025, Andrew Kraus, the son of co-founder Bill Kraus, died in a helicopter crash near the Joint Base Lewis–McChord military base in Washington. Several Mission BBQ locations held honor tables, a way to memorialize military service members who have died on duty, for Andrew over the weekend following his death, and condolences were offered to the Kraus family by Vice President JD Vance and Maryland Governor Wes Moore.

== Operations and management ==
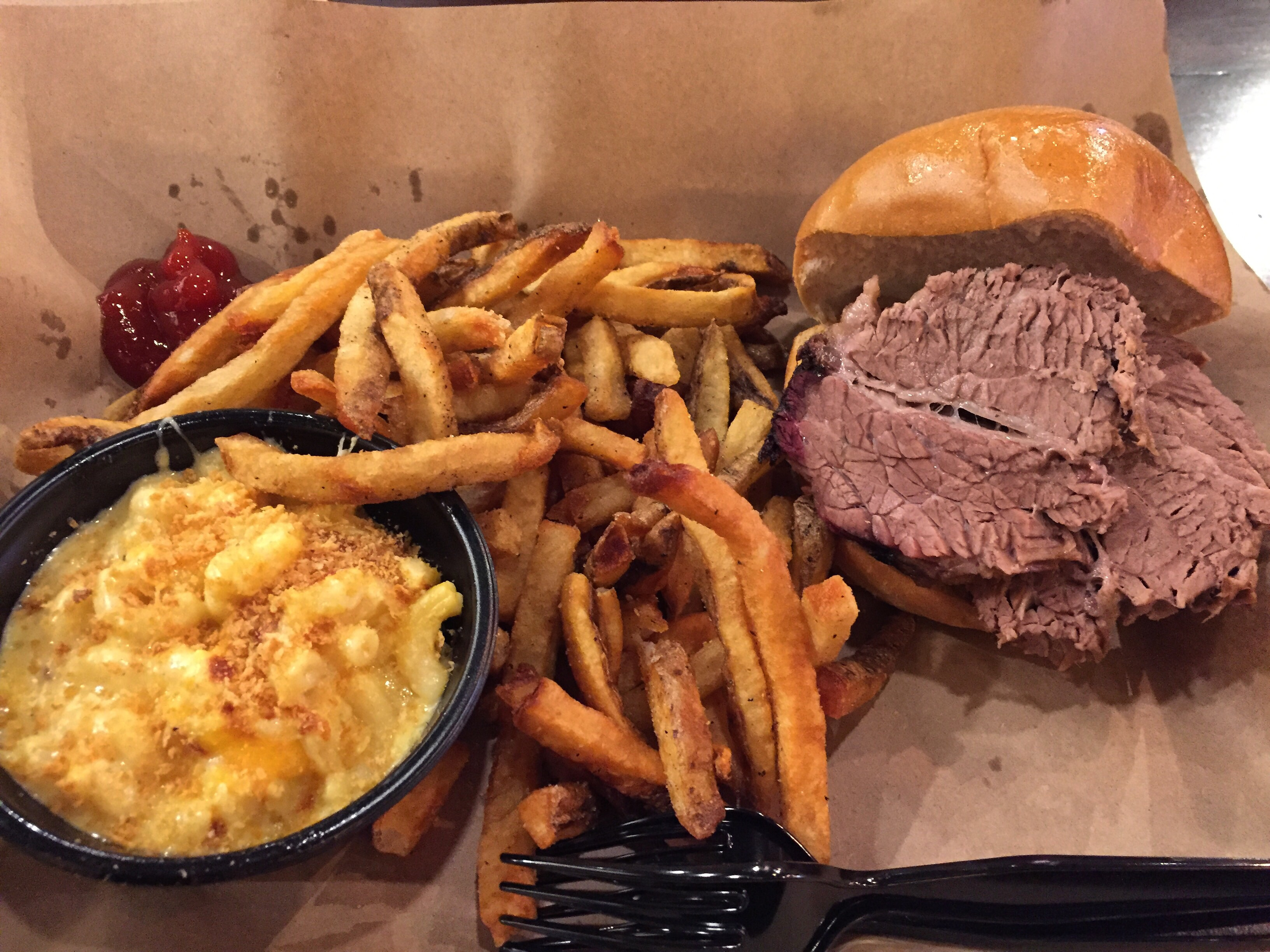
Meal from Mission BBQ

All Mission BBQ restaurants are corporately held and not franchised. The restaurants' dining areas are lined with various military, police, and firefighters memorabilia. All of the restaurant's barbecue sauces are homemade and its meats are smoked on-site with white oak wood for up to 16 hours, depending on the type. For every opening, Mission BBQ allows its first 100 customers to purchase an American Heroes Cup to win a deck of cards that gives them free menu items for a year.

Mission BBQ traditionally plays the national anthem every day at noon. During the COVID-19 pandemic, Mission BBQ streamed the anthem on its Facebook page daily, and locations provided curbside pickup orders and some local deliveries.

Mission BBQ provides catering at each of its locations. In October 2016, the chain refurbished a U.S. Coast Guard RIB boat to use as a delivery boat for its location in Annapolis, Maryland. Mission BBQ's Annapolis location closed on January 20, 2024.

== Philanthropy and partnerships ==
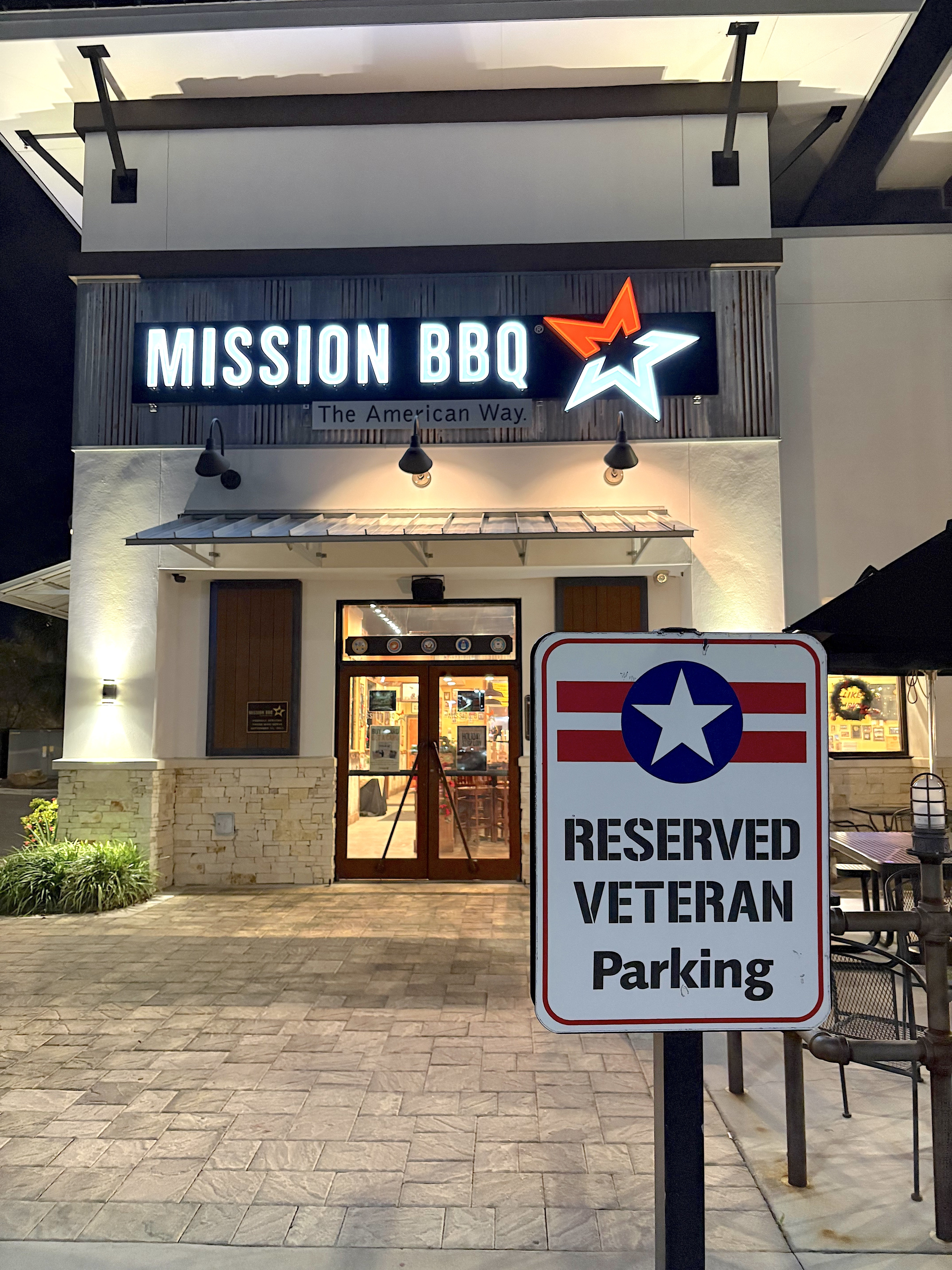
Veteran Parking in front of Mission BBQ in Orlando

Mission BBQ has supported organizations benefiting first responders and veterans—including the Wounded Warrior Project, Wreaths Across America, and police and firefighters unions—through catering, donations, and fundraisers. This, in turn, has provided the chain with a following that includes police, firefighters, and military families as patrons. The company also donates $2 for each American Heroes Cup purchased to the organization featured on the cup and gives out free sandwiches to members of the military and first responders on Veterans Day and September 11 each year.

In July 2021, Mission BBQ announced endorsement deals with the entire offensive lines of the Wisconsin Badgers and Notre Dame Fighting Irish football teams.
