= Club Champion =

US golf club fitting company

Club Champion, LLC is a golf club fitting company based in Willowbrook, Illinois. The company was established in 2010, and has approximately 100 stores and 375 employees.

== Company overview ==
Club Champion has locations in every major golf market in the United States. It delivers tour-quality golf club fittings with the goal of producing longer, more accurate shots for golfers of any skill level. The approach is unbiased; no specific manufacturer is promoted, with the desired result of finding the best combination of components for each customer. Each location has access to more than 50,000 clubhead, shaft, and grip combinations for customers to test.

== History ==
Club Champion was established in 2010 as a three-studio fitting business. The fitting process was designed by the company's founder Nick Sherburne.

Sherburne found his way into golf club fitting in 1998 by helping with club repairs and custom fitting at EJL Golf. Improvements in technology such as launch monitors, new shaft technology, grip updates, and clubhead advancements helped fuel a change in his fitting philosophy, which ultimately resulted in the creation of Club Champion.

Former CEO Joe Lee and former chairman Keith Bank partnered with Sherburne to launch the brand. They liked the idea of providing professional-level services to amateur players in the golf world.

Today, Club Champion has over 100 locations nationwide.

=== Acquisitions ===
Club Champion was acquired by Levine Leichtman Capital Partners (LLCP), a Los Angeles-based private equity firm, in 2019. LLCP was advised by Kirkland & Ellis LLP. North Point Advisors served as financial advisor to the sellers of Club Champion.

Club Champion acquired Canadian club-fitter and builder Tour Experience Golf (TXG) in January 2022. The integration allowed the company to expand its club fitting services beyond the borders of the United States for the first time.

== Accolades ==
Club Champion has been ranked by Golf Digest as one of "America's 100 Best Club Fitters". The publication found that eight out of nine Club Champion customers lowered their score by as much as six strokes per round, added twenty-one yards off the tee with their driver, and added thirteen yards with their irons.

Club Champion also ranks as one of Golf.com's Top 50 Clubfitters in North America.

Club Champion was ranked by Golf Datatech in a 2018 study as the No. 1 specialty fitter in volume, and the No. 2 fitter overall.
