= List of Wheaton College (Illinois) alumni =

This list of Wheaton College alumni includes notable individuals who studied as undergraduates or graduate students at Wheaton College (Illinois).

== Academia ==
- Bart D. Ehrman, 1978 – Distinguished Professor of Religious Studies at the University of North Carolina at Chapel Hill
- John J. Tyson, 1969 – Distinguished Professor of Biological Sciences at Virginia Tech and former president of the Society for Mathematical Biology
- C. Stephen Evans, BA philosophy, 1969 – University Professor of Philosophy and the Humanities at Baylor University
- Nathan O. Hatch, (summa cum laude) 1968 – former president of Wake Forest University and provost of University of Notre Dame
- Arthur F. Holmes – philosopher and professor at Wheaton College
- Douglas Jacobsen, BA philosophy, 1973 – scholar of global Christianity, Distinguished Professor at Messiah University
- Walter Kaiser Jr. – Old Testament scholar
- Robert A. Kraft – historian of early Judaism and Christianity at the University of Pennsylvania
- Merritt Maduke, BS chemistry (summa cum laude), 1989 – Associate Professor of Molecular & Cellular Physiology at Stanford University
- Gerald P. McKenny, BA philosophy, 1979 – Walter Professor of Theology at University of Notre Dame
- Niel B. Nielson, BA philosophy, 1976 – former president of Covenant College
- Mark Noll, BA English – professor of history at University of Notre Dame
- Phil Ryken, BA English literature and philosophy, 1988 – former pastor of Tenth Presbyterian Church and current president of Wheaton College
- Daniel W. Smith, BA literature
- John H. Walton – Old Testament scholar
- Marvin R. Wilson, BA history – Professor of Biblical Studies at Gordon College

== Business ==
- Dwayne Andreas. former CEO of Archer Daniels Midland ADM
- Robert Van Kampen, 1960, founder of the investment banking firm Van Kampen
- Theodore W. Jones, Canadian-born American businessman, and politician; attended for three years
- Robert W. Lane, former CEO of John Deere
- C. William Pollard, former chairman and CEO of ServiceMaster
- Joe Drygas, VP of AT&T
- Billy Zeoli, American media executive

== Civil Rights ==
- C. Herbert Oliver, civil rights activist

== Media, arts and entertainment ==
- Jim Abel – singer-songwriter
- Nuala Archer – Irish-American poet
- Scott Baker – journalist, editor in chief of The Blaze
- Wes Craven, writing and psychology – horror film director
- Piper Curda – singer and actress
- Ian Eskelin, BA Communications – singer-songwriter, All Star United
- Cathleen Falsani, 1992 – journalist; columnist for Chicago Sun-Times
- Colyn Fischer, Bachelor of Music Performance, 1999 – violinist
- Jason Harrod – singer-songwriter, Harrod and Funck
- Carol Huston – actress, Matlock
- Camille and Kennerly Kitt – twin harpists and actresses
- Ken Klippenstein - 2010 Bachelor of Arts English Literature, journalist
- Margaret Landon, 1925 – author of the novel Anna and the King of Siam
- Elliot Leung – film composer – The Battle at Lake Changjin, the highest grossing non-English film of all time
- Kurt Lightner – artist
- Adam McCune, BA, 2006 – co-author of the novel The Rats of Hamelin
- Sylvia McNair, Bachelor of Music, 1978 – soprano
- John Nelson, Bachelor of Music, 1963, DMUS 1989 – conductor
- Jeffrey Nordling, BA, 1984 – actor
- Martin O'Donnell, Bachelor of Music, 1977 – composer, Halo video game series
- Kate Pierson – singer with the B-52s
- Kenneth Pobo - poet
- Walter Ratliff, MA Communications – journalist
- Luci Shaw, BA English Literature/New Testament Greek, magna cum laude, poet
- Mischa Willett - poet
- Robert H. Siegel, BA, 1961 – poet, novelist
- Wendy White, Bachelor of Music, 1975 – mezzo-soprano
- Douglas Yeo, Bachelor of Music, 1976 – bass trombonist

== Politics ==
- David J. Apol – Acting Director of U.S. Office of Government Ethics (2017–2018)
- Torrey C. Brown – Secretary, Maryland Department of Natural Resources
- Dan Coats – Director of National Intelligence (2017–2019), U.S. Senator (R-IN) (1989–1999, 2011–2017)
- Michael Gerson – senior advisor to President George W. Bush (2000–2006)
- Richard C. Halverson – chaplain, U.S. Senate (1981–1994)
- Dennis Hastert – U.S. Representative (R-IL) (1987–2007), former Speaker of the House
- Paul B. Henry – U.S. Representative (R-MI) (1985–1993)
- David Iglesias – U.S. Attorney, District of New Mexico (2001–2006)
- Jim McDermott – U.S. Representative (D-WA) (1989–2017)
- Abram B. Steele – New York State Assembly (1904–1906)
- Russell Vought – Director, Office of Management and Budget (2020–2021)
- Tim Walberg – U.S. Representative (R-MI) (2007–2009, 2011–present)
- Timothy Weeden – Wisconsin State Legislature (1987–1997)
- David Young – Nixon administration (1970–1973); co-founder of the Nixon Administration's White House Plumbers

== Religion ==
- David Anders – later Catholic convert; author, radio host on EWTN, main contributor to "Called to Communion - Catholic and Reformed Dialogue" website
- Juanita Breckenridge Bates – Congregationalist minister
- Rob Bell – founding pastor of Mars Hill Bible Church and featured speaker in NOOMA films
- Paul-Gordon Chandler – Episcopal priest, author and interfaith advocate
- Edmund Clowney – theologian and president of Westminster Theological Seminary
- Mal Couch – founder and president of the Tyndale Theological Seminary
- William Lane Craig – apologist, professor of philosophy at Talbot School of Theology, author of The Kalam Cosmological Argument
- Chip Edgar – Anglican bishop of South Carolina
- Jim Elliot – martyred missionary
- Elisabeth Elliot – author, noted missionary; widow of Jim Elliot
- David Otis Fuller – author, pastor, founder of the "Which Bible?" Society, editor of the Baptist Bulletin
- Bill Gothard – minister and author, former president of the Institute in Basic Life Principles
- Billy Graham – evangelist
- Ruth Graham – author and poet, wife of Billy Graham
- Carl F. H. Henry – first editor-in-chief of the magazine Christianity Today
- Paul King Jewett – theologian and professor at Fuller Theological Seminary
- Daniel C. Juster – leader in the Messianic Judaism movement
- Harold Lindsell – former editor of the magazine Christianity Today
- Ed McCully – martyred missionary
- Josh McDowell – Evangelical Christian apologist and evangelist. Author or co-author of over 150 books.
- Alvera Mickelsen, 1942 – writer, journalism professor, advocate of Christian feminism and co-founder of Christians for Biblical Equality
- John Ortberg – pastor and author
- John Piper – pastor and author
- Stewart Ruch – Anglican bishop of the Upper Midwest
- Nate Saint – martyred missionary
- Steve Saint – author, missionary; son of Nate Saint
- Burton Smith – minister and community organizer
- Jon M. Sweeney – author, editor, book publisher
- Kenneth N. Taylor – paraphraser of The Living Bible and founder of Tyndale Publishers
- Frances E. Townsley – minister
- A. W. Tozer – minister and author
- John Walvoord – author and former president of Dallas Theological Seminary
- Gary Wilde – minister and author
- Philip Yancey – author and editor
- So Yan Pui - Founder of Breakthrough movement, a youth ministry in Hong Kong and Taiwan

== Science ==
- James S. Albus (1935–2011), B.S. 1957 – engineer at the National Institute of Standards and Technology
- Harold Alden (1890–1964), 1912 – astronomer
- Arthur J. Ammann, 1958 – pediatric immunologist; pioneer in understanding HIV transmission, helped develop pneumococcal vaccine
- Paul Werner Gast (1930–1973), 1952 – geochemist and geologist
- J. Laurence Kulp (1921–2006), 1942 – geochemist; pioneer in radiometric dating methods
- Ronald C. Phillips (1932–2005), 1954 – marine botanist; pioneer in seagrass science
- John Wesley Powell (1834–1902), – 19th-century geologist and explorer of the American West
- Dr. Taylor McKenzie - The first Navajo to graduate from a medical school. A surgeon and former Navajo Nation Vice President.

== Sports ==
- Marshall Hollingsworth, 2015 – professional soccer player
- Pete Ittersagen, 2009 – NFL cornerback, Tennessee Titans
- Donnie Nelson, 1986 – General Manager, Dallas Mavericks
- Mel Peterson, 1960 – former NBA player
- Randy Pfund, 1974 – General Manager, Miami Heat
- Andy Studebaker, 2008 – NFL linebacker, Kansas City Chiefs

== Other ==
- Todd Beamer, 1991 – passenger aboard United Airlines Flight 93
- Clinton F. Irwin – Justice of the Oklahoma Territorial Supreme Court (1899–1907)
- Raymond Joseph, 1960 – former Haitian Ambassador to the United States
- Trevor N. McFadden, 2001 – Judge of the United States District Court for the District of Columbia
- Samuel H. Sedgwick, Justice of the Nebraska Supreme Court
- Edward Breathitte Sellers, 1866 – first Wheaton College graduate of color
- Timothy Stoen, 1960 – member of Peoples Temple; Jonestown defector
- Dave Theurer – game designer; created Missile Command and Tempest for Atari
- R. Timothy Ziemer – Navy admiral and global health expert
