= Betsy DeVos =

American politician and philanthropist (born 1958)

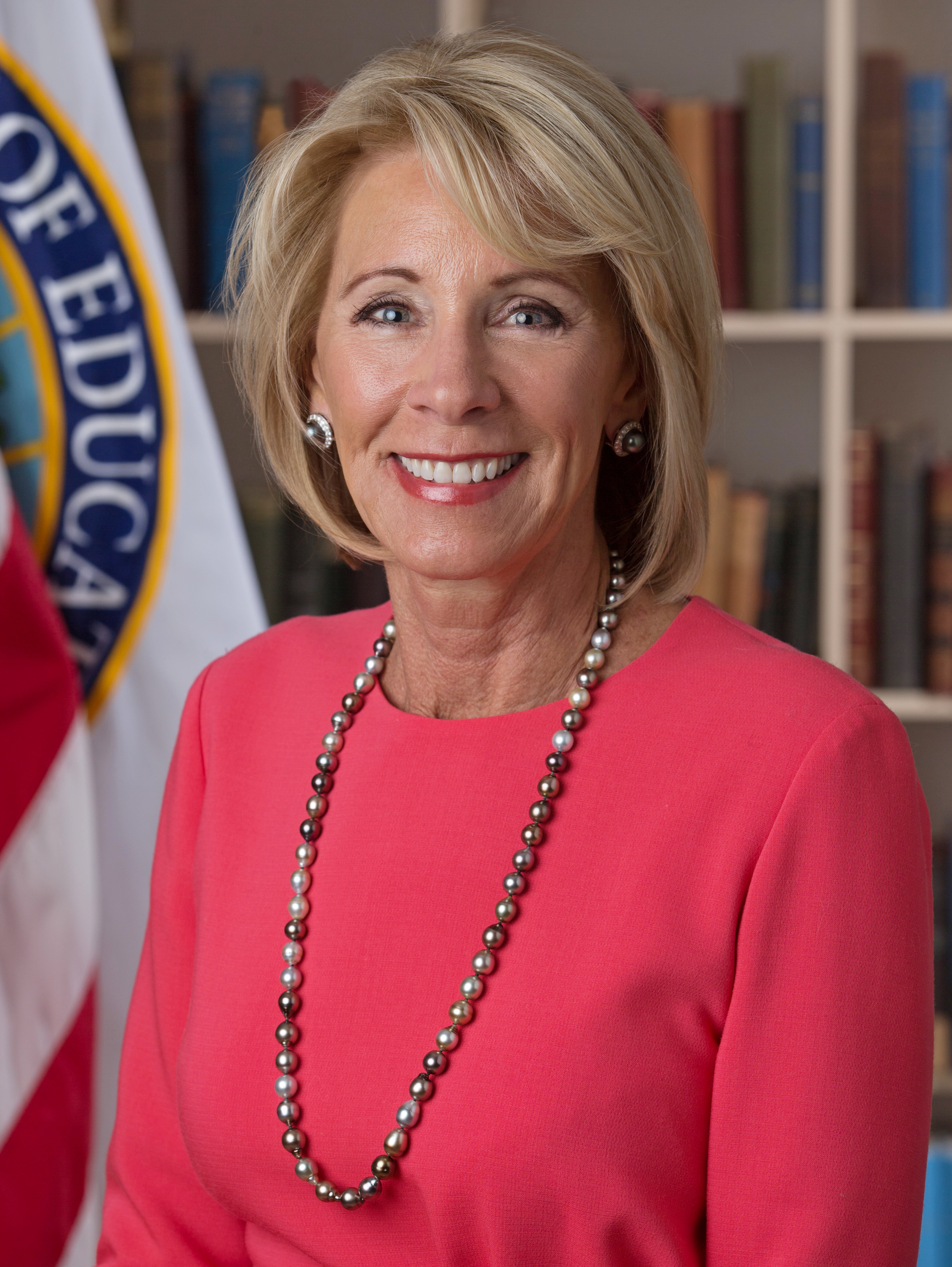
- Official portrait, 2017

11th United States Secretary of Education
- In office February 7, 2017 – January 8, 2021
- President: Donald Trump
- Deputy: Mick Zais
- Preceded by: John King Jr.
- Succeeded by: Miguel Cardona

Chair of the Michigan Republican Party
- In office 2003–2005
- Preceded by: Gerald Hills
- Succeeded by: Saul Anuzis
- In office 1996–2000
- Preceded by: Susy Avery
- Succeeded by: Gerald Hills

Personal details
- Born: Elisabeth Dee Prince; January 8, 1958 (age 68) Holland, Michigan, U.S.
- Party: Republican
- Spouse: Dick DeVos (m. 1979)
- Children: 4
- Relatives: Edgar Prince (father); Erik Prince (brother)
- Education: Calvin College (BA)

Elisabeth Dee DeVos (/dəˈvɒs/ də-VOSS; née Prince; born January 8, 1958) is an American politician, philanthropist, and former government official who served as the 11th United States secretary of education from 2017 to 2021. DeVos is known for her conservative political activism, and particularly her support for school choice, school voucher programs, and charter schools. She was Republican national committeewoman for Michigan from 1992 to 1997 and served as chair of the Michigan Republican Party from 1996 to 2000, and again from 2003 to 2005. She has advocated for the Detroit charter school system and she is a former member of the board of the Foundation for Excellence in Education. She has served as chair of the board of the Alliance for School Choice and the Acton Institute and headed the All Children Matter PAC.

DeVos is married to former Amway CEO Dick DeVos. Her brother, Erik Prince, a former U.S. Navy SEAL officer, is the founder of Blackwater USA. Their father is billionaire industrialist Edgar Prince, founder of the Prince Corporation. In 2016, the family was listed by Forbes as the 88th-richest in America, with an estimated net worth of $5.4 billion.

On November 23, 2016, then-president-elect Donald Trump announced that he would nominate DeVos to serve as the secretary of education in his administration. On January 31, following strong opposition to the nomination from Democrats, the Senate Committee on Health, Education, Labor and Pensions approved her nomination on a party-line vote, sending her nomination to the Senate floor. On February 7, 2017, she was confirmed by the Senate by a 51–50 margin, with Vice President Mike Pence breaking the tie in favor of her nomination. This was the first time in U.S. history that a Cabinet nominee's confirmation was decided by the vice president's tiebreaking vote.

On January 7, 2021, DeVos tendered her resignation as education secretary as a result of the January 6 United States Capitol attack, saying to President Trump in her resignation letter, "There is no mistaking the impact your rhetoric had on the situation." Her resignation took effect on January 8, 2021, twelve days before the end of Trump's term.

== Early life ==
DeVos was born Elisabeth Prince on January 8, 1958. She grew up in Holland, Michigan, the eldest of four children born to Elsa (Zwiep) Prince (later, Broekhuizen) and Edgar Prince, a billionaire industrialist. Edgar was the founder of Prince Corporation, an automobile parts supplier based in Holland, Michigan. She is of Dutch ancestry.

DeVos was educated at the Holland Christian High School, a private school located in her home town of Holland, Michigan. She graduated from Calvin College in Grand Rapids, Michigan, where she earned a Bachelor of Arts degree in business economics in 1979. During college, DeVos was involved with campus politics, volunteered for Gerald Ford's presidential campaign, and attended the 1976 Republican National Convention to participate in a program for young Republicans.

DeVos grew up as a member of the Christian Reformed Church in North America. She has been a member and elder of Mars Hill Bible Church in Grand Rapids. Former Fuller Seminary president Richard Mouw, with whom DeVos served on a committee, said she is influenced by Dutch neo-Calvinist theologian Abraham Kuyper, a founding figure in Christian Democracy political ideology.

== Political activity ==
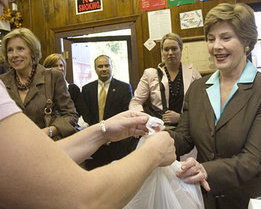
DeVos (far left) is present as First Lady Laura Bush (far right) makes a purchase at Franklin Cider Mill. Bush was in Michigan to support DeVos's husband in his gubernatorial campaign.

Since 1982, DeVos has participated in the Michigan Republican Party. She served as a local precinct delegate for the Michigan Republican Party, having been elected for 16 consecutive two-year terms since 1986. She was a Republican National committeewoman for Michigan between 1992 and 1997, and served as chairwoman of the Michigan Republican Party from 1996 to 2000. In 2004, the Lansing State Journal described DeVos as "a political pit bull for most of (Democratic) Governor [Jennifer] Granholm's 16 months in office" and said that if DeVos was not Granholm's "worst nightmare", she was "certainly her most persistent".

Bill Ballenger, editor of the newsletter Inside Michigan Politics and a former Republican state senator, called DeVos "a good behind-the-scenes organizer and a good fund raiser" as well as "a true believer in core Republican issues that leave nobody in doubt on where she stands". DeVos resigned the position in 2000. She said in that same year, "It is clear I have never been a rubber stamp. ... I have been a fighter for the grassroots, and following is admittedly not my strong suit." In 2003, DeVos ran again for party chairman and was elected to the post without opposition.

=== Political fundraising ===
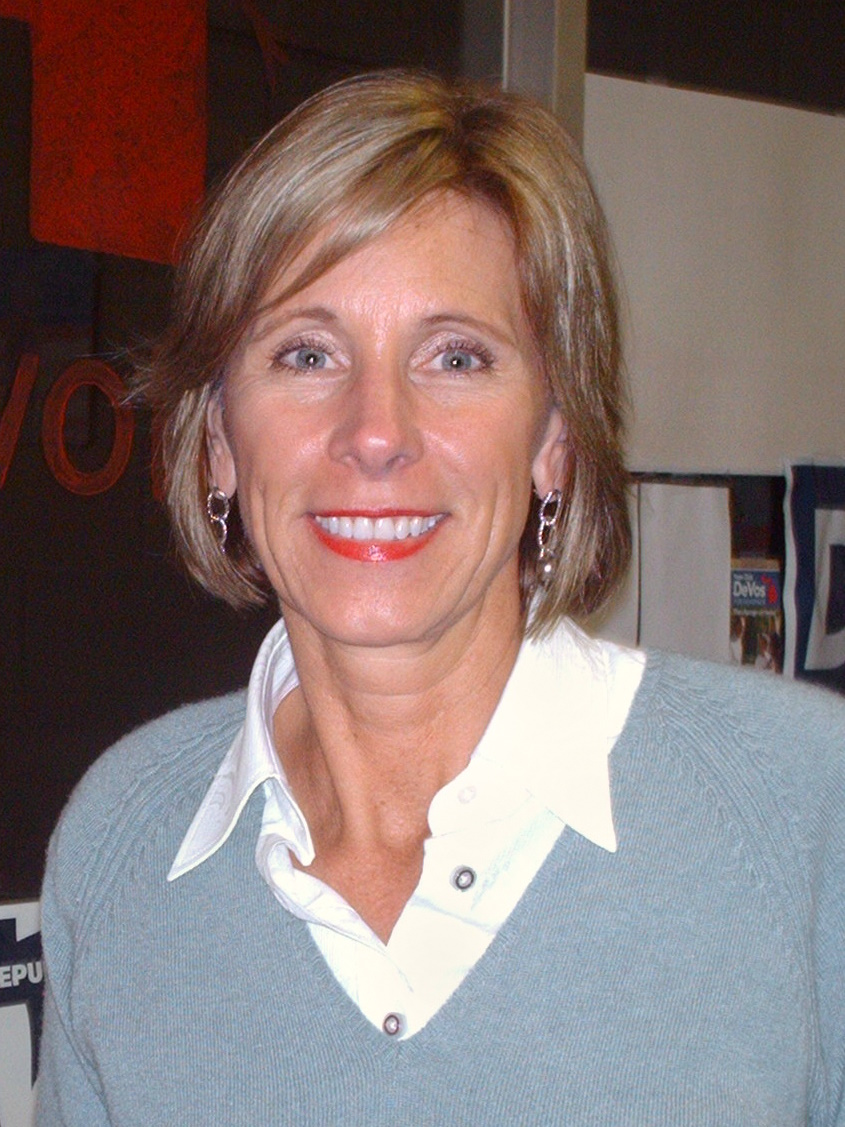
DeVos in 2005

DeVos personally raised more than $150,000 for the 2004 Bush re-election campaign, and hosted a Republican fundraiser at her home in October 2008 that was headlined by President George W. Bush. During the Bush administration she spent two years as the finance chairperson for the National Republican Senatorial Committee and worked closely with the administration on "various projects". The DeVos family has been active in Republican politics for decades, particularly as donors to candidates and the party, giving more than $17 million to political candidates and committees since 1989.

==== Opposition to limits on political spending ====
Like other members of the DeVos family, Betsy strongly opposed government limits on political donations and spending. While popular with the American public as a way to prevent (perceived) unfair domination by the wealthy in politics, DeVos and many other conservatives argue it is an infringement on free speech. In a 1997 op-ed for Roll Call, defending unlimited donations of "soft money" in political spending, DeVos compared government limits to Big Brother of George Orwell's Nineteen Eighty-Four. Betsy was a founding board member of the James Madison Center for Free Speech which the DeVos family funded and whose "sole goal was to end all legal restrictions on money in politics".

She also wrote (in Roll Call) that she expected results from her political contributions. "My family is the largest single contributor of soft money to the national Republican Party. I have decided to stop taking offense at the suggestion that we are buying influence," she wrote. "Now I simply concede the point. They are right." She also stated in the op-ed, "We expect to foster a conservative governing philosophy consisting of limited government and respect for traditional American virtues. … We expect a return on our investment; we expect a good and honest government. Furthermore, we expect the Republican Party to use the money to promote these policies and, yes, to win elections."

=== 2016 U.S. presidential election ===
During the Republican Party presidential primaries for the 2016 election, DeVos initially donated to Jeb Bush and Carly Fiorina before eventually supporting Marco Rubio. In March 2016, DeVos described Donald Trump as an "interloper" and said that he "does not represent the Republican Party".

== Business career ==
DeVos is chairwoman of the Windquest Group, a privately held operating group that invests in technology, manufacturing, and clean energy. DeVos and her husband founded it in 1989. With a commitment of $100 million, Betsy DeVos's family was one of the largest investors—and losers—in blood-testing company Theranos.

DeVos and her husband were producers for a Broadway run of the stage play Scandalous: The Life and Trials of Aimee Semple McPherson, in 2012, based on the life of the famous evangelist and featuring a book and lyrics written by Kathie Lee Gifford. The show ran for three weeks, closing in December 2012 after receiving negative reviews.

=== Neurocore ===
Betsy and her husband Dick are chief investors in and board members of Neurocore, a group of brain performance centers offering biofeedback therapy for disorders such as depression, attention deficit disorder, autism, and anxiety. The therapy consists of showing movies to patients and interrupting them when they become distracted, in an effort to retrain their brains. According to The New York Times, a review of Neurocore's claims and interviews with medical experts suggest that the company's conclusions are unproven and its methods questionable. Democratic senators raised concerns about a potential conflict of interest and questioned whether she and her family members would "benefit financially from actions" she could take as the U.S. Secretary of Education. DeVos announced that she would step down from the company's board but would retain her investment in the company, valued at $5 million to $25 million. In November 2019, Truth In Advertising filed complaints against Neurocore with the Food and Drug Administration for unapproved medical devices and the Federal Trade Commission for deceptive marketing.

== U.S. Secretary of Education ==
=== Nomination ===
On November 23, 2016, Trump's transition team announced DeVos as the nominee to be the next secretary of education. Upon her nomination, DeVos said "I am honored to work with the President-elect on his vision to make American education great again. The status quo in ed is not acceptable." DeVos's nomination was generally criticized by teachers' unions and praised by supporters of school choice.

Detroit Free Press editor Stephen Henderson expressed concerns over DeVos's nomination, writing that "DeVos isn't an educator, or an education leader". Rebecca Mead of The New Yorker questioned the efficacy of Michigan's charter school system, which DeVos has supported. Randi Weingarten, president of the American Federation of Teachers, called DeVos "the most ideological, anti-public education nominee" since the position became a cabinet position. The Michigan chapter of the American Civil Liberties Union and the Michigan Democratic Party opposed DeVos's nomination.

Former presidential candidates Jeb Bush and Mitt Romney respectively called DeVos an "outstanding pick" and a "smart choice". Republican senator Ben Sasse said DeVos "has made a career out of standing up to powerful and connected special interests on behalf of poor kids who are too often forgotten by Washington". In an opinion editorial, the Chicago Tribune wrote that "DeVos has helped lead the national battle to expand education opportunities for children".

==== Confirmation hearing ====
External videos
- Betsy DeVos Education Secretary Confirmation Hearing, full video of hearing from C-SPAN, January 17, 2017
- Betsy DeVos's confirmation hearing, in three minutes, The Washington Post, January 17, 2017
- Final Vote in the Senate for Confirmation of Betsy DeVos as Secretary of Education, full video of vote from C-SPAN, February 2, 2017

The confirmation hearing for DeVos was initially scheduled for January 10, 2017, but was delayed for one week after the Office of Government Ethics requested more time to review her financial disclosures. On January 17, 2017, the Senate Committee on Health, Education, Labor and Pensions held the hearing, which lasted three-and-one-half hours and "quickly became a heated and partisan debate". Democratic senators directed several questions toward her regarding her wealth, including questions about her family's political donations to the Republican Party and whether or not she had personal experience with financial aid or student loans. Several media outlets reported that DeVos appeared to have plagiarized quotes from an Obama administration official in written answers submitted to the Senate committee. DeVos drew widespread media attention during the confirmation hearings for suggesting that guns might have a place in some schools due to a threat from grizzly bears. DeVos's comment was later lampooned by television personalities Kate McKinnon on Saturday Night Live, Jimmy Kimmel, Stephen Colbert and James Corden.

Prior to DeVos's confirmation, numerous U.S. senators from both parties reported tens of thousands of their constituents having contacted their offices in opposition to the confirmation of DeVos. More than 300 state lawmakers from across the U.S., overwhelmingly Democrats, voiced their opposition to DeVos's appointment in a letter to the U.S. Senate sent the day before a scheduled vote on her nomination. DeVos's nomination was supported by 18 Republican governors, including John Kasich and Rick Snyder, along with the nine Republican members of Congress from Michigan.

==== Debate and final vote ====
Vice President Mike Pence breaks the 50–50 tie in favor of DeVos, confirming her as U.S. secretary of education.

On January 31, DeVos's nomination was approved by the committee on a 12–11 party-line vote and was due to be voted on by the Senate. Later on February 1, 2017, two Republican U.S. senators, Susan Collins from Maine and Lisa Murkowski from Alaska, came out against the confirmation (despite supporting DeVos in committee when both of them voted to move her nomination to the floor), bringing the predicted confirmation vote on DeVos to 50–50 if all Democrats and independents voted as expected, meaning Vice President Mike Pence would have to break the tie. During an unusually early 6:30 a.m. vote on February 3, 2017, cloture was invoked on DeVos's nomination in the Senate, requiring a final vote on the confirmation to happen after 30 hours of debate.

Ahead of the scheduled final vote at noon on February 7, 2017, the Democrats in the Senate continuously spoke on the floor against the confirmation of DeVos the entire night before leading up to the vote, in protest of their strong disapproval of the nominee. As expected, there was a 50–50 tie on the final vote, with all Democrats and independents, along with two Republicans (Susan Collins and Lisa Murkowski), voting in opposition to DeVos, while the other fifty Republican senators voted in support of the confirmation, including Senator Jeff Sessions, who himself had been nominated by the Trump administration for the post of United States attorney general. Republicans scheduled Sessions's confirmation vote after DeVos's so that he would be able to cast his vote in support of DeVos. Had his confirmation vote been earlier than hers, he would have been forced to resign from the Senate, therefore losing a vital vote for the Republicans on the confirmation. Since there was a tie, Vice President Mike Pence had to step in to decide the vote as the president of the Senate. He cast his tie-breaking vote in favor of DeVos to officially confirm her as education secretary. This was the first tie decided by a vice president on any vote in the Senate since the George W. Bush administration.

=== Staffing ===
DeVos said that on the basis of her first few days in the job, she had concerns that some Education Department employees were sympathetic to the Obama administration. "I . . . would not be surprised if there are also those that would try to subvert the mission of this organization and this department," she stated. Asked what she could do about that, she said, "Whatever can be done will be done, and it will be done swiftly and surely."

In April 2017, DeVos praised the president's nomination of Carlos G. Muñiz as the department's general counsel.

In April 2017, DeVos named Candice Jackson Deputy Assistant Secretary in the department's Office for Civil Rights, where she will be acting assistant secretary while that higher, Senate-confirmed appointment is vacant. DeVos named Jason Botel Deputy Assistant Secretary for Elementary and Secondary Education. Botel, a registered Democrat who supported President Obama and the Black Lives Matter movement, founded the KIPP Ujima Village Academy in Baltimore, after working for Teach For America.

In mid-May 2018, The New York Times reported that under DeVos, the size of the team investigating abuses and fraud by for-profit colleges was reduced from about twelve members under the Obama administration to three, with their task also being scaled back to "processing student loan forgiveness applications and looking at smaller compliance cases". DeVos also appointed Julian Schmoke as the team's new supervisor; Schmoke was a former dean of DeVry Education Group, which was one of the institutions the team had been investigating. The investigation into DeVry was not the only one stopped, others include those of Bridgepoint Education and Career Education Corporation. The Education Department has hired more ex-employees and people affiliated with those institutions, such as Robert S. Eitel, senior counselor to DeVos, Diane Auer Jones, an advisor to the department, and Carlos G. Muñiz, the department's general counsel.

In October 2018, it was announced that DeVos's chief of staff, Josh Venable, would be replaced by Nate Bailey, who at that time was DeVos's chief of communications. Two years later, Venable joined an anti-Trump group, the Republican Political Alliance for Integrity and Reform (REPAIR), which is led by former White House officials.

=== Policy actions ===
==== School choice and private schools ====
In February 2017, DeVos released a statement calling historically black colleges "real pioneers when it comes to school choice", causing controversy as some pointed out the schools originated after segregation laws prevented African Americans from attending others. DeVos later acknowledged racism as an important factor in the history of historically black colleges.

On March 24, 2017, during a visit to the Osceola County campus of Valencia College, DeVos said she was considering the extension of federal financial aid for students that were year-round and interested in placing more focus on community colleges.

DeVos delivered her first extended policy address on March 29, 2017, at the Brookings Institution which included the topic of school choice which has been her main advocacy issue for more than 30 years. She stated an interest in implementing choice policies directed toward children as individuals and criticizing the Obama administration's additional funding of $7 billion for the U.S.'s worst-performing schools as "throwing money at the problem" in an attempt to find a solution. On May 22, 2017, DeVos announced the Trump administration was offering "the most ambitious expansion" of school choice within American history. DeVos cited Indiana (which has the U.S.'s largest school voucher program) as a potential model for a nationwide policy but did not give specific proposals.

In a May 2017 House of Representatives committee hearing, Rep. Katherine Clark, said an Indiana private school which takes publicly funded vouchers maintains it is entitled to deny admission to LGBTQ students or those coming from families with "homosexual or bisexual activity." Clark asked if she would inform Indiana that it could not discriminate in that way if it accepted federal funding and asked her how she would respond in the event a voucher school rejected black students but a state "said it was okay." DeVos answered: "Well again, the Office of Civil Rights and our Title IX protections are broadly applicable across the board, but when it comes to parents making choices on behalf of their students..." Clark stopped her saying, "This isn't about parents making choices, this is about the use of federal dollars. Is there any situation? Would you say to Indiana, that school cannot discriminate against LGBT students if you want to receive federal dollars? Or would you say the state has the flexibility?" DeVos responded: "I believe states should continue to have flexibility in putting together programs ..."

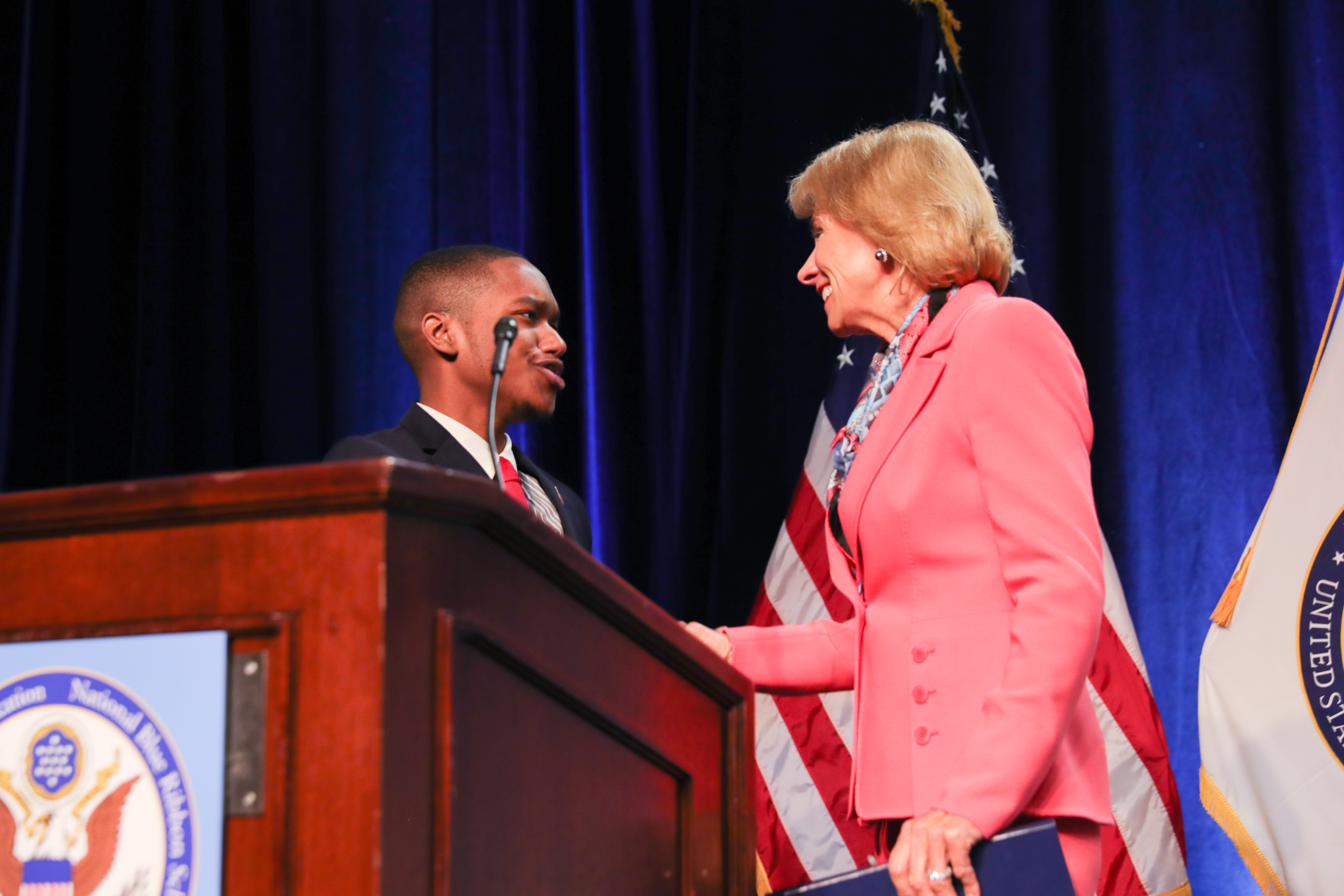
DeVos at 2017 National Blue Ribbon Schools Awards Ceremony

CBS reporter Lesley Stahl questioned DeVos, in a March 2018 60 Minutes interview, about the documented failure of the DeVos programs to demonstrate a positive result, in Michigan, her home state: "Your argument that if you take funds away that the schools will get better is not working in Michigan ... where you had a huge impact and influence over the direction of the school system." Stahl added, "The public schools here are doing worse than they did." DeVos was unable to provide any actual examples of improvement, but stated there were "pockets" where schools had done better than public schools.

On June 6, 2017, DeVos said states' rights would determine private schools being allocated funds by the federal government during an appearance before members of a House appropriations committee.

==== Student loans ====
On April 11, 2017, DeVos undid several Obama administration policy memos issued by John King Jr. and Ted Mitchell which were designed to protect student loan borrowers.

On July 6, 2017, Democratic attorneys-general in 18 states and Washington, D.C., led by Massachusetts attorney-general Maura Healey, filed a federal lawsuit against DeVos for suspending the implementation of rules that were meant to protect students attending for-profit colleges. The rules, developed during the Obama administration, were meant to take effect on July 1, 2017.

On September 12, 2018, DeVos lost the lawsuit brought by 19 states and the District of Columbia, which accused the Department of Education of improperly delaying implementation of regulations protecting student loan borrowers from predatory practices.

==== Coronavirus pandemic ====
During the coronavirus pandemic, DeVos directed millions of dollars of coronavirus relief funds from the Coronavirus Aid, Relief and Economic Security Act intended for public schools and colleges, to private and religious schools.

DeVos pushed for schools to re-open while coronavirus cases were still surging in large parts of the country. She said that the Trump administration was considering pulling funding from public schools unless they provided full-time in person learning during the pandemic. On July 12, 2020, she said "there's nothing in the data that suggests that kids being in school is in any way dangerous to them", an assertion that public health experts disputed. She also refused to say whether schools should follow guidelines laid out by the Centers for Disease Control and Prevention (CDC) on reopening schools.

==== Other ====
On June 2, 2017, DeVos announced her support of President Trump's decision to withdraw from the Paris Agreement the prior day.

On July 13, 2017, Candice Jackson, who is a sexual assault survivor, organized a meeting with DeVos, college sexual assault victims, accused assailants, and higher education officials, and said she would look at policies on sexual assault accusations on campuses from the Obama administration to see if accused students were treated within their rights. Asked by CBS 60 Minutes reporter Lesley Stahl about her repeal of Obama administration guidelines for colleges dealing with reports of sexual assaults, she said her concern was for men falsely accused of such assaults. "Survivors, victims of a lack of due process, and campus administrators have all told me that the current approach does a disservice to everyone involved," said DeVos. However, some survivors of sexual assault and harassment and organizations which advocate on their behalf oppose the changes and say they would make schools more dangerous.

In October 2017, DeVos revoked 72 guidance documents of the Office of Special Education and Rehabilitative Services which outlined the rights of disabled students under the Individuals with Disabilities Education Act and the Rehabilitation Act.

In a January 2018 speech, DeVos said that the American Federation of Teachers (AFT) found that "60 percent of its teachers reported having moderate to no influence over the content and skills taught in their own classrooms." In response, AFT noted that in the same survey of around 5,000 educators, 86% felt that DeVos had disrespected them.

In March 2018, DeVos announced a School Safety Commission, to provide meaningful and actionable recommendations. Members were four Cabinet members, including herself. The organization held a meeting on March 28 and a gathering of school shooting survivors and families on April 17.

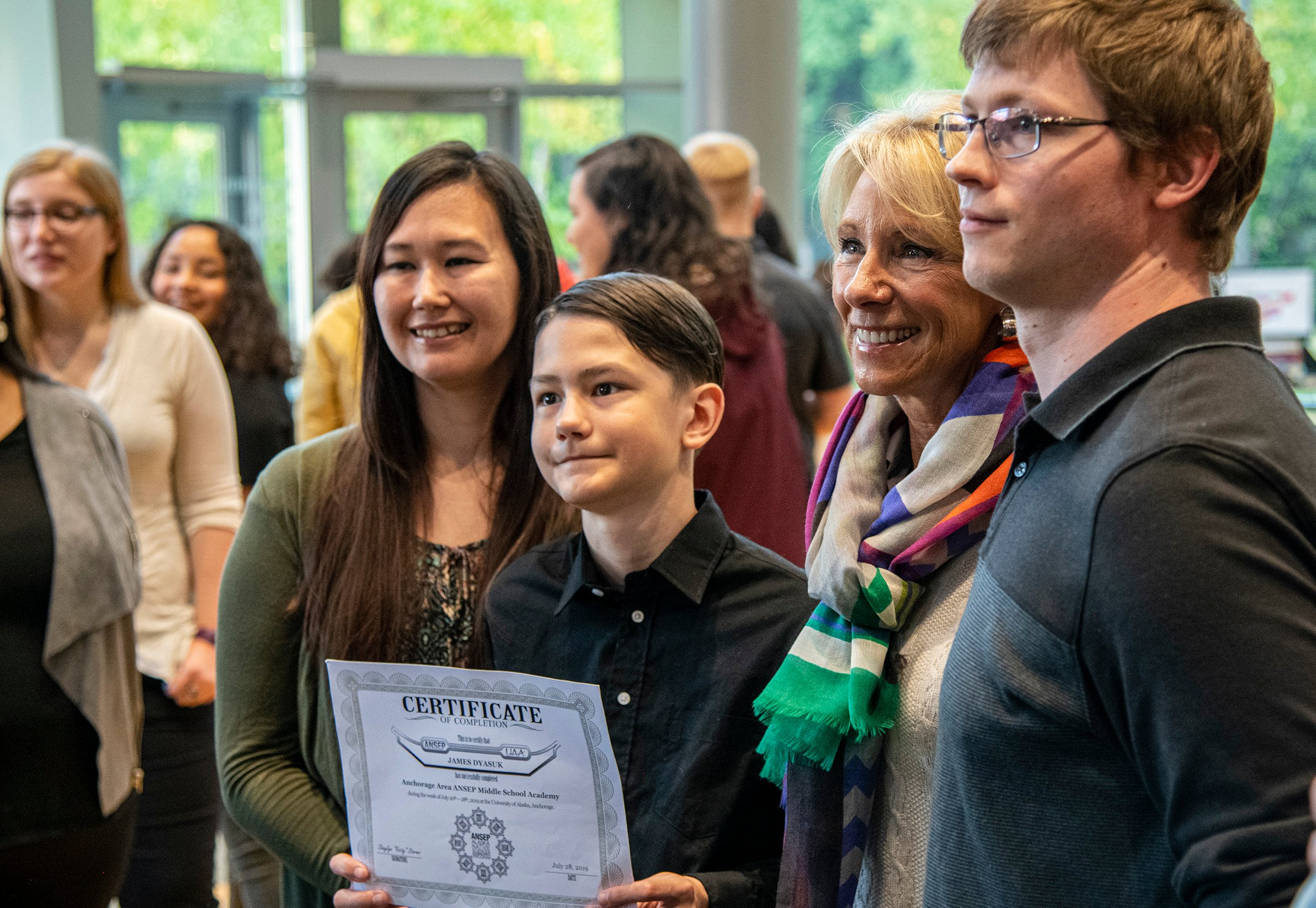
DeVos in Alaska in August 2019

In late May 2018, DeVos said that she believed it was "a school decision" on whether to report a student's family to the Immigration and Customs Enforcement (ICE) if the student or their family are undocumented immigrants. However, under Plyler v. Doe, the American Supreme Court ruled under the US constitution, schools are obligated to provide schooling irrespective of immigration status. The American Civil Liberties Union has said that because of this, it would be unconstitutional for schools to report students or their families to ICE.

In 2019, DeVos unsuccessfully attempted to cut federal funding for the Special Olympics from her department's budget, which she had also attempted to cut in her previous two annual budgets.

=== Protests and security ===
DeVos was a controversial figure throughout her tenure. In her first official appearance as Secretary on February 10, 2017, dozens of protesters showed up to prevent her appearance. The protesters physically blocked her from entering through the back entrance of Jefferson Academy, a D.C. public middle school in Southwest, Washington, D.C. DeVos was eventually able to enter the school through a side entrance.

Subsequent to the incident, the U.S. Marshals Service, rather than Education Department employees, began providing security for her. Education Department officials declined requests for information about the deployment of marshals or the current tasks of the Secretary's displaced security team normally assigned to her. Many of those security personnel are former Secret Service agents who have worked at the department for many years. Regarding the withdrawal of the department's team, former Education Secretary Arne Duncan said, "That's a waste of taxpayer money."

During her first visit to a public university on April 6, 2017, DeVos was confronted by around 30 protestors. She was touring an area designed to resemble a hospital ward at Florida International University. The following day, the U.S. Marshals Service said after a threat evaluation was conducted in February that DeVos would be given additional security, projecting a cost of $7.8 million between February and September 2017.

On May 10, 2017, DeVos gave a commencement speech at Bethune–Cookman University, a historically black college, and during her speech a majority of the students booed DeVos, with about half of them standing up and turning their backs to her. She also received an honorary doctorate from the university.

=== Legal issues ===
According to DeVos's 2018 financial disclosure form certified by the Office of Government Ethics on December 3, 2018, she had not divested from twenty-four assets required under her signed ethics agreement nearly 22 months after being confirmed in February 2017.

In May 2019, the Education Department inspector general released a report concluding that DeVos had used personal email accounts to conduct government business and that she did not properly preserve these emails.

In September 2020, it was reported that the Office of the Special Counsel had investigated DeVos over potential violations of the Hatch Act after she appeared on Fox News during the 2020 election campaign, where she attacked Democratic Party presidential nominee Joe Biden. After her television appearance, the Department of Education promoted her Fox News interview.

=== Resignation ===
On January 7, 2021, DeVos resigned from her position as Secretary of Education after the January 6 U.S. Capitol riots. She said in her letter to President Trump that the riots had overshadowed the accomplishments of his administration. She was the second cabinet member to resign following the insurrection, the first being Secretary of Transportation Elaine Chao. Hours after her resignation, Senator Elizabeth Warren later called her the worst Secretary of Education on Twitter, saying she never did anything to help students, and saying she would rather quit than invoke the Twenty-fifth Amendment to the United States Constitution to remove Trump from office.

== Philanthropy and activism ==
=== The Prince Foundation ===
DeVos was listed for many years on IRS form Form 990s as the foundation's vice president (hitherto called the Edgar and Elsa Prince Foundation). However, she testified under oath in the Senate Health, Education, Labor, and Pensions Committee hearing, in response to Senator Maggie Hassan's questions, that she had nothing to do with the contributions made by her mother's foundation to conservative advocacy groups including Focus on the Family and the Family Research Council.

=== Dick and Betsy DeVos Family Foundation ===
The Dick & Betsy DeVos Family Foundation was launched in 1989. The foundation's giving, according to its website, is motivated by faith, and "is centered in cultivating leadership, accelerating transformation and leveraging support in five areas", namely education, community, arts, justice, and leadership. In 2015, the DeVos Foundation made $11.6 million in charitable contributions, bringing the couple's lifetime charitable giving to $139 million. Forbes ranked the DeVos family No. 24 on its 2015 list of America's top givers.

The DeVos Foundation has donated to hospitals, health research, arts organizations, Christian schools, evangelical missions, and conservative, free-market think tanks. Of the $100 million the foundation donated between 1999 until 2014, half of it went to Christian organizations. Organizations funded by the foundation include: Michigan's Foundation for Traditional Values; Center for Individual Rights; Acton Institute; Institute for Justice; Center for Individual Rights; Michigan's Pregnancy Resource Center; Right to Life Michigan Educational Fund; and Baptists for Life.

With respect to educational-focused donations, the foundation from 1999 to 2014 supported private Christian schools (at least $8.6 million), charter schools ($5.2 million), and public schools ($59,750). Specific donations included $2.39 million to the Grand Rapids Christian High School Association, $652,000 to the Ada Christian School, and $458,000 to Holland Christian Schools.

In 2016, the foundation reported $14.3 million in donations to over 100 organizations including the X Prize Foundation, Mars Hill Bible Church, American Enterprise Institute.

When DeVos was appointed US Education Secretary, it was revealed that she was an elder at Mars Hill Bible Church. During her tenure, she reportedly donated $431,000 to the church between 2002 and 2004 and $453,349 to Flannel, producer of the NOOMA video series.

=== Acton Institute and All Children Matter ===
DeVos has served as chairperson, board member, and treasurer of the Acton Institute and headed the All Children Matter PAC.

=== Arts ===
==== Kennedy Center ====
DeVos was appointed by President George W. Bush to the board of directors of the Kennedy Center for the Performing Arts in 2004, and served until 2010. While she was on the board, she and her husband funded a center to teach arts managers and boards of directors how to fundraise and manage their cultural institutions. The couple donated $22.5 million in 2010 to continue the endeavor, which was given in the name of the DeVos Institute of Arts Management.

After the announcement of the DeVoses' gift to the Kennedy Center, DeVos explained that she had been persuaded by Kennedy Center official Michael Kaiser's observation that millions of dollars are invested "in the arts, and training artists", but not in "training the leaders who hire the artists and run the organizations". The DeVoses' gift was intended to remedy this oversight. "We want to help develop human capital and leverage that capital to the greatest extent possible", she said, describing Kaiser's "practice and approach" as "practical, realistic and creative". The DeVoses' gift, part of which would be spent on arts groups in Michigan that had been hit hard by the recession, was the largest private donation in the Kennedy Center's history.

==== ArtPrize ====
In 2009, Betsy DeVos's son Rick DeVos founded ArtPrize, an international art competition held in Grand Rapids, Michigan. As of 2016 approximately 16 percent of ArtPrize's $3.5 million annual budget was provided by various foundations run by the DeVos family, with the rest provided by other foundations and local and national businesses.

=== Education activism ===
Betsy and Dick DeVos provide an annual scholarship to students at Northwood University. DeVos is a former member of the board of the Foundation for Excellence in Education (ExcelinEd), an education think tank founded by Jeb Bush, the chairman since 2015 of which has been former US Secretary of State Condoleezza Rice, and which has received donations from Bill Gates, Michael Bloomberg and Eli Broad.

==== Christian motivation ====
DeVos in 2001 listed education activism and reform efforts as a means to "advance God's Kingdom". In an interview that year, she also said that "changing the way we approach ... the system of education in the country ... really may have greater Kingdom gain in the long run".

==== School choice ====
DeVos believes education in the United States should encourage the proliferation of charter schools and open up private schools to more students via financial assistance programs, often called vouchers. She has stated that education is "a closed system, a closed industry, a closed market. It's a monopoly, a dead end." DeVos believes that opening up the education market will offer parents increased choice, a view that critics call a drive to privatize the American public education system.

==== School vouchers ====
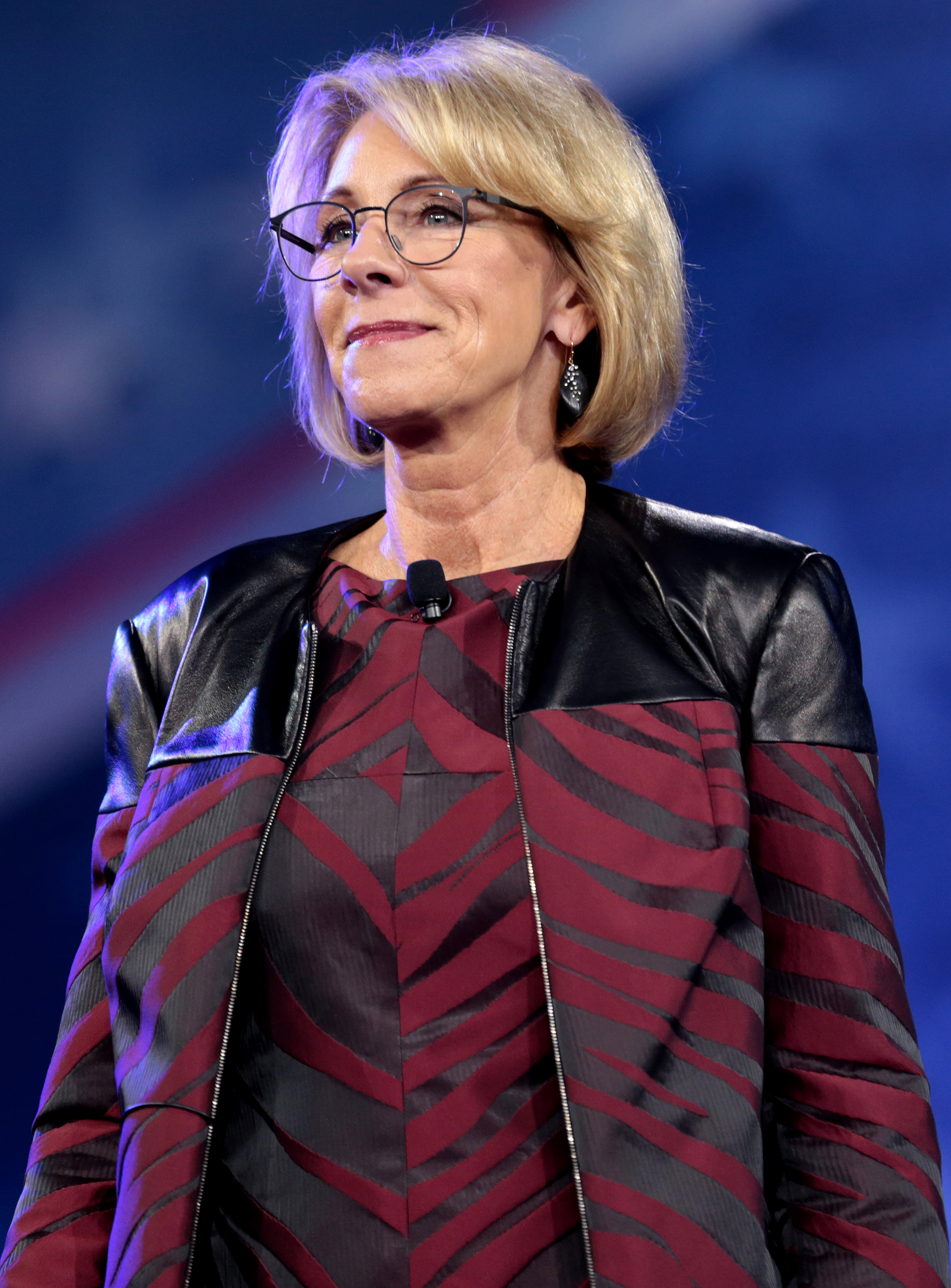
DeVos at CPAC in 2017

DeVos is known as "a fierce proponent of school vouchers" that would allow students to attend private schools with public funding. According to The New York Times, it "is hard to find anyone more passionate about the idea of steering public dollars away from traditional public schools than Betsy DeVos".

DeVos served as chairwoman of the board of Alliance for School Choice. Until November 2016, she headed the All Children Matter PAC which she and her husband founded in 2003 to promote school vouchers, tax credits to businesses that give private school scholarships, and candidates who support these causes. DeVos and her husband gave millions of dollars to the organization. In 2008, All Children Matter was fined $5.2 million in Ohio for illegally laundering money into political campaign funds. DeVos was not named in the case. The fine remained unpaid as of 2017, prompting calls by Democratic Party lawmakers for DeVos to settle the debt.

Her other activities on behalf of public-school reform have included membership on the boards of directors of the Advocates for School Choice, the American Education Reform Council, and the Education Freedom Fund. She has chaired the boards of Choices for Children, and Great Lakes Education Project (GLEP).

DeVos was chair of the American Federation for Children (AFC). Affiliated with the Alliance for School Choice, the AFC describes itself as "a leading national advocacy organization promoting school choice, with a specific focus on advocating for school vouchers and scholarship tax credit programs".

During the 1990s, she served on the boards of Children First America and the American Education Reform Council, which sought to expand school choice through vouchers and tax credits. She and her husband worked for the successful passage of Michigan's first charter-school bill in 1993, and for the unsuccessful effort in 2000 to amend Michigan's constitution to allow tax-credit scholarships or vouchers. In response to that defeat, DeVos started a PAC, the Great Lakes Education Project, which championed charter schools. DeVos's husband and John Walton then founded All Children Matter, a political organization, which she chaired.

==== Detroit charter school system ====
DeVos has been an advocate for the Detroit charter school system. Douglas N. Harris, professor of economics at Tulane University, wrote in a 2016 The New York Times op-ed that DeVos was partly responsible for "what even charter advocates acknowledge is the biggest school reform disaster in the country". In the National Assessment of Educational Progress, Detroit had the lowest reading and mathematics scores "by far" over any city participating in the evaluation. According to Harris, she designed a system with no oversight in which schools that do poorly can continue to enroll students.

Ramesh Ponnuru of National Review argued that Harris overstates the failure of charter schools in Detroit. According to Ponnuru, the study referenced by Harris, the National Assessment of Educational Progress, did "not sound nearly as helpful to Harris's case as he suggests". Ponnuru pointed out that the study says "some 47 percent of charter schools in Detroit significantly outperform[ed] traditional public schools in reading and 49 percent of charters significantly outperforming traditionals on math. Only one percent of charters were significantly outperformed by traditional public schools in reading and only 7 percent on math." Also defending DeVos's record in Michigan, Jay P. Greene, professor of education policy at the University of Arkansas, argued that Harris's The New York Times article misled readers on the evidence and "falsely claimed that Detroit has failed to close failing charter schools", noting that Detroit has closed more charters than Louisiana, a state Harris cites as a model for charter school legislation.

In a written response to a question about charter school performance posed during DeVos's confirmation hearing by Senator Patty Murray (D-WA), asking "why do you think their performance is so poor?", DeVos defended the charter school system using graduation rates that were significantly higher than those used for state and federal accountability purposes. DeVos provided examples of several charter schools that she said had 4-year graduation exceeding 90%. These examples were contested by Columbia University professor Aaron Pallas and Education Week reporter Ben Herold on the basis that the actual graduation rates were roughly only half as large as DeVos had stated.

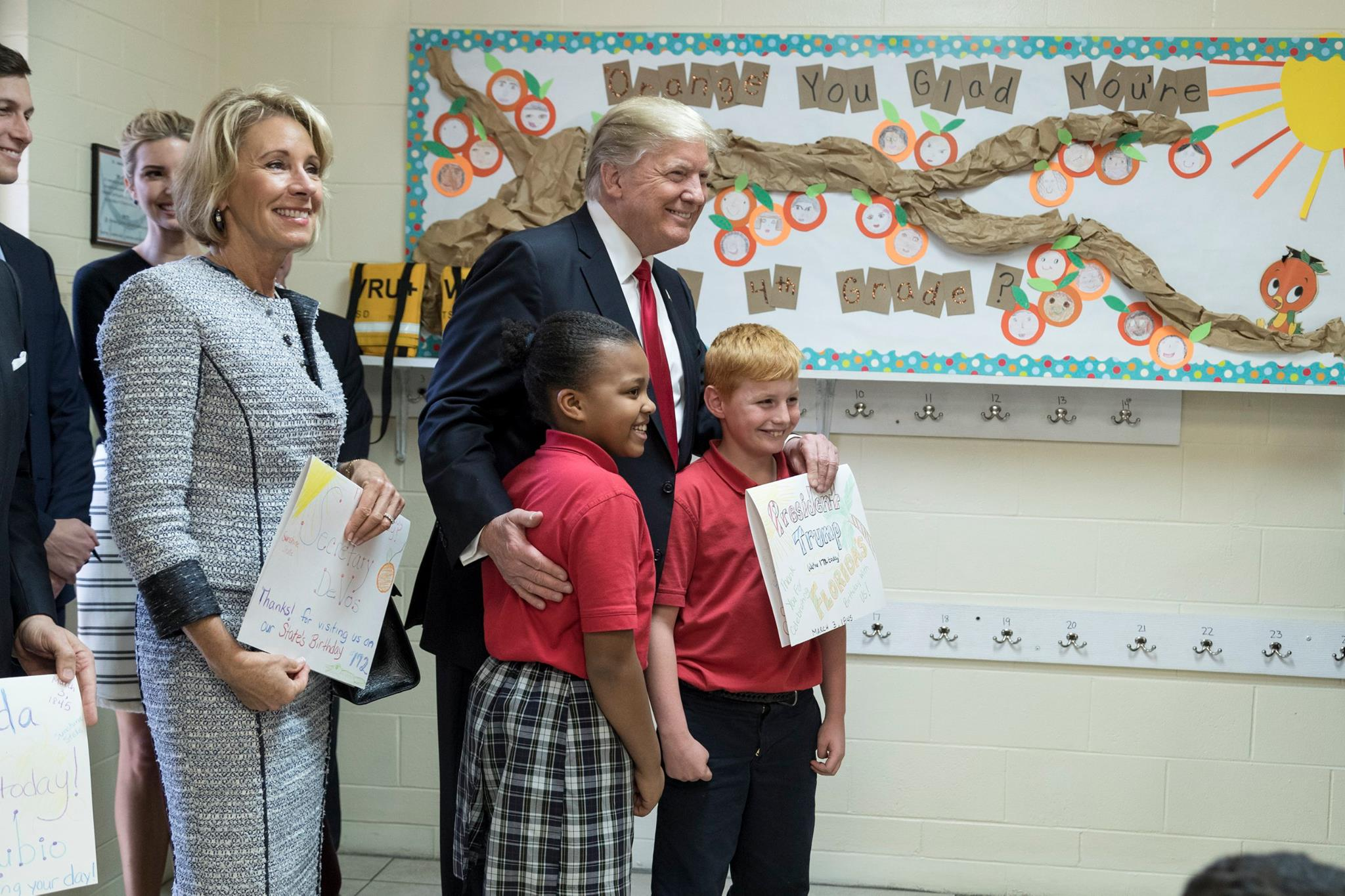
DeVos and Donald Trump with students in Florida

== Personal life ==
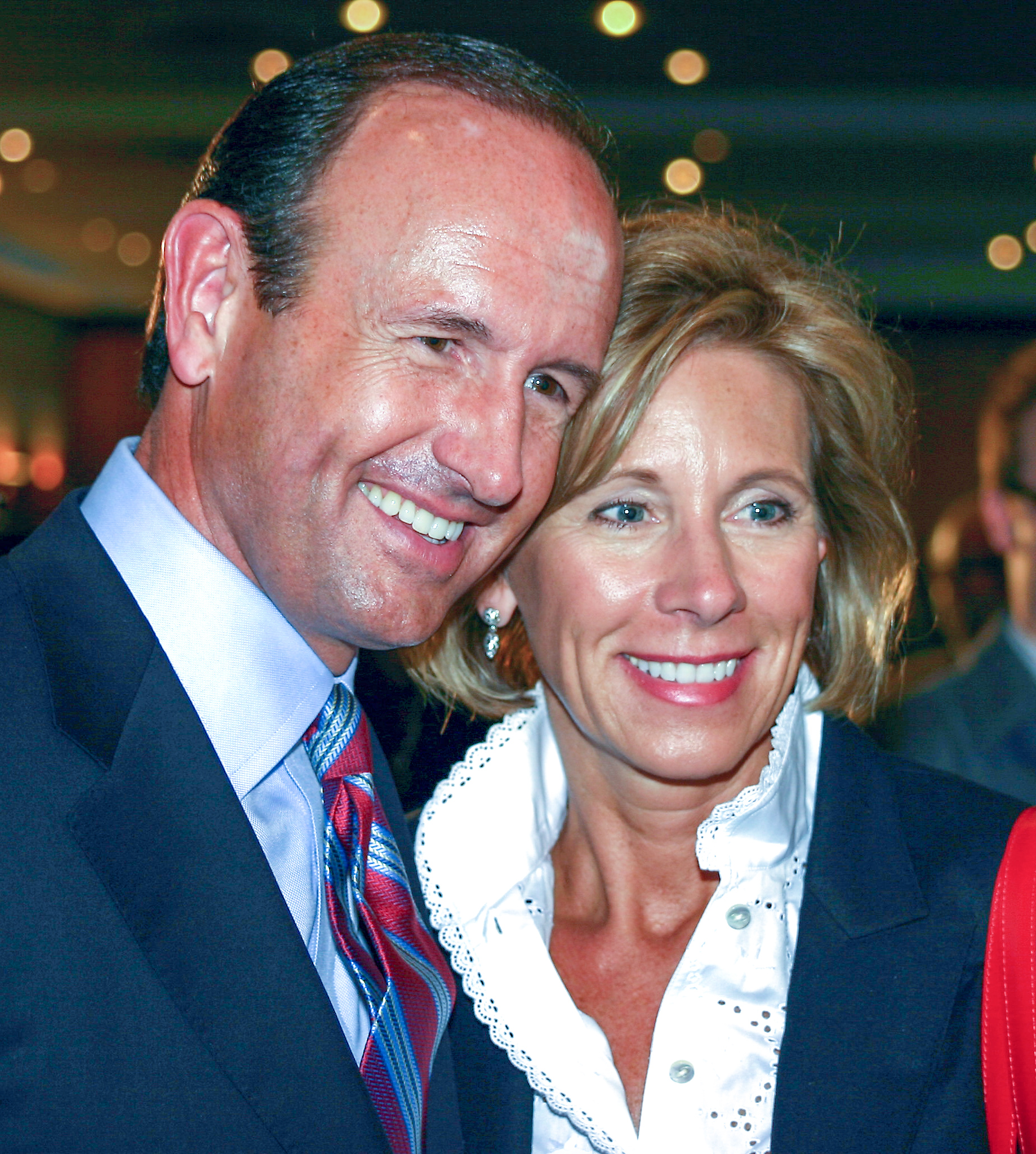
Dick and Betsy DeVos at the October 10, 2006 gubernatorial debate in Grand Rapids, Michigan

The DeVos family is one of Michigan's wealthiest. Betsy DeVos's husband, Richard Marvin "Dick" DeVos Jr., is a multi-billionaire heir to the Amway fortune who ran Amway's parent company, Alticor, from 1993 to 2002. Dick DeVos is a major donor to conservative political campaigns and social causes, and was the 2006 Republican nominee for Governor of Michigan. Dick's father, Richard Marvin DeVos Sr., co-founded Amway and was the owner of the Orlando Magic NBA basketball team. Richard DeVos was listed by Forbes in 2016 as having a net worth of $5.1 billion, making him America's 88th wealthiest individual.

Dick and Betsy DeVos married in 1979, and have four grown children: Rick, Elissa, Andrea, and Ryan. Rick works for the Windquest Group as a consultant on urban development, and is the founder of Grand Rapids' ArtPrize festival.

Betsy DeVos's brother, Erik Prince, a former U.S. Navy SEAL officer, is the founder of Blackwater USA, a private military services contractor.

== Cultural depictions ==
In February 2017, artist Glenn McCoy created a political cartoon called Trying to Trash Betsy DeVos, based on Norman Rockwell's The Problem We All Live With. In the same month, The Tonight Show Starring Jimmy Fallon parodied the Education Department's typos on Twitter, featuring Jo Firestone as DeVos.

DeVos has been played by Kate McKinnon on Saturday Night Live multiple times, including satirizing DeVos's 60 Minutes interview in March 2018. That same month, Randy Rainbow created a satirical "interview" with DeVos based on the 60 Minutes interview, with Out stating, "It goes about as well as you'd expect it to."

DeVos was depicted by drag queen Scarlet Envy on the March 21, 2019 episode of RuPaul's Drag Race season 11 titled "Trump: The Rusical." Scarlet Envy depicted DeVos as "silly" and "martini-swilling." In the series' fourteenth season, drag queen Jasmine Kennedie appeared as DeVos for the show's signature celebrity impersonation challenge, Snatch Game.

== See also ==
- List of female United States Cabinet members

Party political offices
Preceded by Susy Avery	Chair of the Michigan Republican Party; 1996–2000	Succeeded by Gerald Hills
Preceded by Gerald Hills	Chair of the Michigan Republican Party; 2003–2005	Succeeded by Saul Anuzis
Political offices
Preceded by John King Jr.	United States Secretary of Education; 2017–2021	Succeeded by Miguel Cardona
U.S. order of precedence (ceremonial)
Preceded by John F. Kelly as Former U.S. Cabinet Member	Order of precedence of the United States as Former U.S. Cabinet Member	Succeeded by Jeff Sessions as Former U.S. Cabinet Member
