= Pobo =

Pobo or POBO may refer to:

- POBO, an initialism of "president of baseball operations", a role superior to a general manager in professional baseball
- Kenneth Pobo (born 1954), American author, poet, and educator
- El Pobo, a municipality in the province of Teruel, Aragon, Spain
- El Pobo de Dueñas a municipality in the province of Guadalajara, Castile-La Mancha, Spain

== See also ==
- POB (disambiguation)
- P.O. box
