= Ellman's =

Former catalog merchant

- Industry: Retailing
- Predecessor: Citizens Jewelry
- Founded: 1946, Atlanta, Georgia, U.S.
- Founder: Michael Ellman, Robert Weinstein
- Defunct: 1985
- Fate: Acquired by Service Merchandise
- Headquarters: Atlanta, Georgia, U.S.
- Area served: Atlanta, Georgia; Greensboro, North Carolina; Charlotte, North Carolina
- Products: Jewelry, general merchandise

Ellman's was an American catalog merchant. Founded in 1946 in Atlanta, Georgia as a jewelry store, it began operating catalog stores in 1966. The chain reached a peak of eleven locations, with nine in the metropolitan Atlanta area and two in North Carolina, before being bought out by Service Merchandise in 1985.

== History ==
Ellman's began in 1946 in Atlanta, Georgia. Michael Ellman owned a jewelry store called Citizens Jewelry, and began wholesaling merchandise to military bases during World War II with his son-in-law Robert Weinstein. Weinstein joined with Abe Lewis and Irving Wender to operate the wholesaler full time, and named it after Ellman despite him no longer being involved in the company, as they thought doing so was indicative of his name recognition as a local merchant.

After the war, the company began wholesaling jewelry to local merchants, as well as businesses who used jewelry as incentives for company milestones. The company began selling jewelry to the general public in the 1950s, and first distributed catalogs in 1959. As their wholesaling was proving unsuccessful, they chose to switch the business operation to a catalog merchant instead. Their first catalog store opened in 1966, located at 2489 Cheshire Bridge Rd. NE in Atlanta. The 50,000-square-foot (4,600 m^{2}) building, in addition to a catalog showroom, also housed the company's offices and warehouse. Two more Atlanta-area locations opened in 1972 and 1973. Also in 1973, the firm announced plans to build a location adjacent to Altamonte Mall in Altamonte Springs, Florida. However, the location was never built, and the site was sold off in 1979 for non-retail use.

A fourth location opened by Southlake Mall later in the decade. In 1977, Weinstein reported that the opening of the fourth location had created a 24 percent increase in sales across all stores. The firm's first location outside of Atlanta opened in 1977, adjacent to Carolina Circle Mall in Greensboro, North Carolina. The sixth location, in Charlotte, North Carolina, began construction in 1978. The chain's fifth Atlanta-area location and seventh overall opened near Northlake Mall in 1980. The store featured a computerized inventory system, as well as a system of conveyor belts to aid in movement of merchandise, and was described by a company director as "the largest-volume catalog showroom in the Southeast."

Weinstein stepped down as president of Ellman's in 1981 and was replaced with Al Katz. The company employed twelve staff members to publish and distribute catalogs, and manufactured most of its own jewelry. In 1981, they were estimated to have printed over 600,000 catalogs annually. Despite store renovations, Ellman's reported decrease in sales in 1983, which the firm attributed to increased competition from Atlanta-based department store Rich's, as well as the rise of off-price and discount stores.

Service Merchandise announced in April 1985 that it was seeking to purchase the Ellman's chain. At the time, it consisted of eleven stores: nine in the Atlanta area and two in North Carolina. This, coinciding with a purchase of H. J. Wilson Co. that same month, led to Service Merchandise becoming the largest catalog retailer in the United States.
