= Jim Abel =

American singer-songwriter

- Born: James L. Abel; March 1, 1947 (age 79); Independence, Missouri, U.S.
- Genres: folk, alternative music
- Occupations: Singer; Songwriter
- Instruments: Guitar (heard in profiles and performance descriptions)
- Years active: 2002–2008 (based on active recording and performance period)
- Label: Independent (self-released) (based on his DIY album releases)
- Website: www.wordsandmusic.us

Jim Abel (born March 1, 1947, in Independence, Missouri) is an American singer-songwriter. He writes and performs a style of folk and alternative music, influenced by the American Songbook, Woody Guthrie, Tom Paxton, and music of the 1960s.

== Education ==
Abel began writing songs while attending Wheaton College, where he majored in philosophy. He subsequently received an MBA from Northwestern University's Kellogg School of Management, where he was an Austin Scholar, and embarked on a successful career as an executive in the healthcare industry.

== Career ==
Abel left the corporate world in 1984 to manage his investments full-time and became a stay-at-home father to son Ted. In 2002 he began to focus more intensively on his musical career.

Until he announced his retirement from the music business, Abel wrote, performed, and recorded a wide variety of music, including humorous and serious songs about love, friends, and family; political songs; parodies; and show tunes.

Abel played regularly in venues in Kansas City, Missouri and surrounding communities. He has received a great deal of press attention including articles in The Kansas City Star, the Johnson County Sun, the Lee's Summit Journal, The Topeka Capital-Journal, and 435 South magazine; TV coverage on KBMC TV9 Evening News and WDAF TV4 Midday News; and online coverage in The Pitch Wayward Blog, KansasCity.com Prime Buzz, KClightrail.com, and the Midwest Record.

Abel has released four independent albums: Live! from Death Valley Junction (2003); Patriot Act (2003); Decoration Day(2006); and Thunder (May 2008).

Abel currently lives in Leawood, Kansas, with his wife, Deborah Hays.

== See also ==
- List of Wheaton College (Illinois) alumni
