= Service Merchandise =

American catalog showroom retailer

- Type: Private
- Industry: Retail
- Founded: 1934; 92 years ago (as five-and-dime store and later wholesale company); 1960; 66 years ago (as catalog showroom retailer)
- Founders: Harry Zimmerman; Mary Zimmerman
- Defunct: 2002; 24 years ago
- Fate: Bankruptcy and liquidation
- Headquarters: Brentwood, Tennessee
- Key people: Harry Zimmerman; Raymond Zimmerman
- Products: Jewelry, gifts, home decor products, sporting goods, electronics, toys

Service Merchandise was a retail chain of catalog showrooms carrying jewelry, toys, sporting goods and electronics. The company, which first began in 1934 as a five-and-dime store, was in existence for 68 years before ceasing operations in 2002.

== History ==
Service Merchandise's history can be traced to 1934, to a small five-and-dime store founded by Harry and Mary Zimmerman in the town of Pulaski, Tennessee. After leaving the wholesale business, they opened Service Merchandise, Inc., the first of what evolved into a chain of catalog showrooms. It opened in 1960 at 309 Broadway in downtown Nashville, Tennessee.

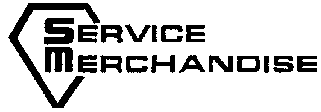
Older logo mainly used in the 1970s–1985

During the 1970s and 1980s, Service Merchandise was a leading catalog-showroom retailer. At its peak, the company achieved more than $4 billion in annual sales. As the company expanded, it began to open showrooms nationwide, mostly in the vicinity of major shopping malls, which were in vogue in the 1970s. In the early 1980s, the Service Merchandise headquarters moved from Nashville to nearby Brentwood, Tennessee, becoming one of the first businesses to plant itself in the area that is now known as Cool Springs. During that same time, and into the 1990s, the company became a prominent sponsor of game shows such as Wheel of Fortune and The Price Is Right, where the company provided some of the prizes awarded to contestants.

In May 1985, Service Merchandise acquired the H. J. Wilson Co. for approximately $200 million. Raymond Zimmerman, the CEO, was attracted to Wilson's stores to gain a stronger foothold in the Sun Belt states. Several of these Wilson's locations included an off-priced apparel department of about 15,000 square feet (1,400 m^{2}). Service Merchandise also had other wholly owned subsidiaries featuring retail stores, such as Zim's Jewelers, HomeOwners Warehouse (later called Mr. HOW Warehouse), The Lingerie Store and The Toy Store.

=== Downfall ===
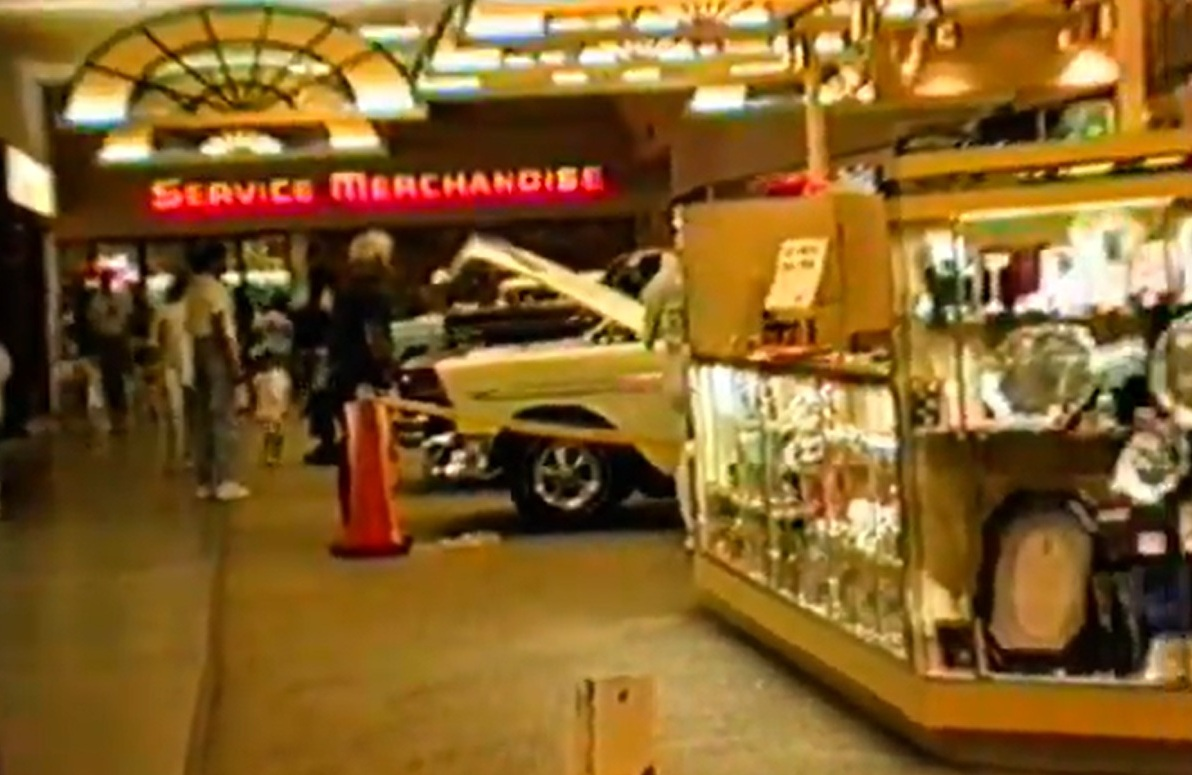
Service Merchandise at the Dutchess Mall in Fishkill, New York in 1989

The company lost market share in its housewares and electronics sectors to giant discounters, such as Walmart and Bed Bath & Beyond, and later Best Buy and Circuit City. Although Service Merchandise was early to embrace the Internet in the 1990s, generating tens of millions of dollars in sales, it was not enough to offset the damage done by the mega-chain stores springing up nationwide.

Gary M. Witkin was appointed to the new position of president and chief operating officer in 1994.

The company responded to the market pressures with a series of restructuring plans that included the discontinuation of unprofitable product lines, including electronics, toys and sporting goods, and refocusing on jewelry, gifts and home decor products. Many of its showrooms were also closed or downsized significantly.

=== Bankruptcy and liquidation ===
Final logo used from 1999 to 2002 before the company's bankruptcy and closure

While in the process of changing its retail format, a group of creditors forced an involuntary petition for bankruptcy under Chapter 11 on March 15, 1999, seeking court supervision of the company's restructuring. The company later filed a voluntary Chapter 11 petition to improve relations with its vendors and creditors in an effort to stabilize its business. At the time, it was one of the top ten bankruptcy cases in the nation.

Raymond Zimmerman, son of the original founders, resigned as chairman of the board in November 2000. The company attempted to pull itself out of bankruptcy once again in summer 2001, but the economic downturn following the September 11 attacks proved to be a hurdle the company could not clear.

With only 200 catalog showrooms remaining, the stock was valued at less than one cent per share. With no profitability in sight, Service Merchandise ceased operations and shuttered all of its remaining stores by early 2002.

== Showroom ordering process ==
Service Merchandise had an unusual ordering process that emphasized the catalog, even within the showrooms. Other chains such as Brendle's, Best Products, Sterling Jewelry & Distributing Company, and McDade's used this model. However, they too eventually suffered the same fate.

The reason behind offering the catalog showroom approach to retailing was that it reduced the risk of merchandise theft, known in the industry as shrinkage, and also enabled customers to shop without the inconvenience of physically dragging purchases throughout the store.

For non-jewelry orders, customers would enter the showroom and receive a carbon-paper order form and clipboard to record the catalog numbers of desired items. Items were displayed in working order in the showroom, allowing customers to test products as they shopped. Current Service Merchandise catalogs were placed on stands in strategic locations throughout the store to allow customers to shop for items not on display. When ready to place their orders, customers would take the order form to a clerk, who would submit the order to the store's stockroom via his computer-terminal cash register, as well as take payment for the items. The customer would then move to the "Merchandise Pickup Area" near the exit, where the order would emerge from the stockroom on a conveyor belt.

This process was altered in the late 1980s to allow customers to place their own orders on a number of self-service computer kiosks named "Silent Sam", which the company later renamed "Service Express".

In the mid-1980s, Service Merchandise experimented with the installation of drive-through windows at two showrooms (near Chicago and Nashville), allowing customers with phone-in orders to pick up their orders without leaving their automobiles. The concept was not expanded beyond its test stores, but remained in place at those locations.

== Support of the Muscular Dystrophy Association ==
Service Merchandise was a large corporate donor to the Muscular Dystrophy Association. Chairman/CEO Raymond Zimmerman would appear multiple times on the yearly Jerry Lewis MDA Telethon to present donations on behalf of the company and its customers.

== See also ==
- Argos – a comparable UK big box operation featuring similar goods and catalogue-warehouse fulfillment
- Consumers Distributing – a similar (and also failed) retailer in Canada and the US
- Witmark – a regional competitor in Michigan
