= Gerald Hills =

American politician and educator

Chair of the Michigan Republican Party
- In office July 27, 2000 – October 26, 2003
- Preceded by: Betsy DeVos
- Succeeded by: Betsy DeVos

Personal details
- Born: Gerald J. Hills II
- Party: Republican
- Spouse: Carla Hills
- Children: 3

Gerald (Rusty) J. Hills, II is an American politician and educator in the state of Michigan and was formerly the senior advisor to former Michigan Attorney General Bill Schuette.

Rusty Hills also serves as Chancellor and Founder of Holy Spirits Institute, a non-profit educational venture. His goal is to establish a quality, four-year liberal arts Catholic college, located in the Greater Lansing area. The first class began in the fall of 2005.

Prior to beginning the college, Hills spent almost two decades in public service and politics. He was twice elected unanimously to serve as Chairman of the Michigan Republican Party. Before that, Hills served ten years as one of Governor John Engler's chief lieutenants following Engler's electoral ouster of two-term incumbent James Blanchard in November 1990.

Before his government service, Rusty Hills worked for then State Party Chairman Spencer Abraham, as Director of Communications, helping Abraham to re-engineer the renaissance of the Michigan Republican Party.

Prior to politics, Hills worked as a reporter and anchorman for CBS and NBC television affiliates in Lansing, Jackson and Flint, Michigan.

Hills has a Bachelor of Arts degree in Telecommunications from Michigan State University, and he earned a Master of Government degree from the University of Notre Dame.

Rusty is married to Carla Hills, and they have three children.

Party political offices
Preceded by Betsy DeVos	Chairman of the Michigan Republican Party; 2000 – 2003	Succeeded by Betsy DeVos
