= Shop-Rite (Canada) =

Chain of catalogue stores in Ontario, Canada

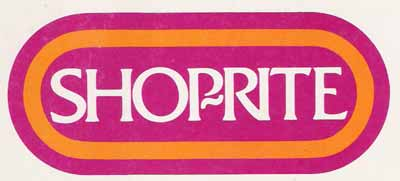
- Company type: Subsidiary
- Industry: Catalogue store
- Founded: Early 1970s
- Defunct: 1982
- Fate: Bankruptcy
- Headquarters: Brampton, Ontario
- Number of locations: 65
- Parent: Middlesex Warehouse Sales Ltd. (early 1970s-1972); Hudson's Bay Company (1972-1982)

Shop-Rite was a chain of catalogue stores in Ontario, Canada, that operated from the 1970s to 1982. In a Shop-Rite catalogue store, customers would browse the catalogue, select their merchandise and apply to the store clerk for the item.

The chain began with four stores in London, Ontario, in the early 1970s and was acquired in 1972 by Hudson's Bay Company (HBC) when it purchased Middlesex Warehouse Sales Ltd., the operators of Shop-Rite catalogue stores. HBC, which operates The Bay department store chain and other retailers, expanded the chain to 60 stores within three years and built a large distribution centre in Brampton.

In November 1981, the chain had 65 stores in Ontario when HBC announced that it would close the unprofitable chain on January 30, 1982. Shop-Rite had been running annual losses of $3 million as a result of waning consumer interest. It was expected that it would cost The Bay $8 million to close the chain, and that about 10 percent of Shop-Rite's staff would be offered jobs in The Bay. Wally Evans, president of The Bay at the time, said that in order to make the business viable, it would have to expand outside of Ontario, but that it did not have the money to do so.

Shop-Rite was unable to compete with Consumers Distributing, which had over 400 catalogue stores in 1981 and sales of 40 per cent more per store than Shop-Rite. Consumers Distributing closed in 1996 due mainly to the increase in big-box department stores like Zellers and Walmart.

== See also ==
- List of Canadian department stores
