= Brendle's =

Defunct American catalog showroom chain

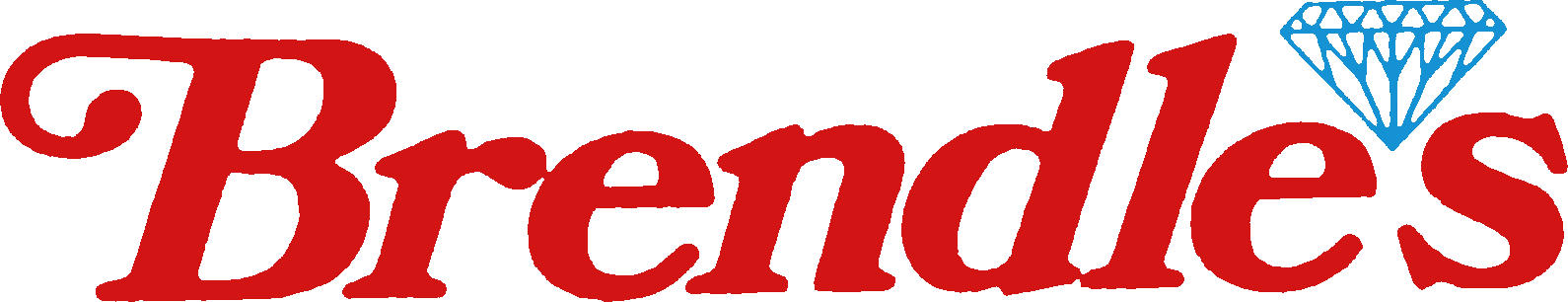
- Genre: Catalog showroom
- Founded: 1918
- Defunct: 1996
- Fate: Bankruptcy and liquidation
- Headquarters: Elkin, North Carolina

Brendle's was a chain of catalog showrooms based in Elkin, North Carolina, USA. Its showrooms carried jewelry, toys, sporting goods, and electronics. At its peak in 1990, Brendle's operated 58 showrooms in North Carolina, South Carolina, Virginia, Georgia, and Tennessee.

The company announced it was closing in 1996 a few months after filing for Chapter 11 bankruptcy protection for a second time.

== History ==
The company began in 1918 as SW&Y Supply, a wholesale grocery-distributing business. In 1953, Douglas D. Brendle, the grandson of the company's founder, joined the business. He began stocking toys and houseware items, turning its Elkin warehouse into its first wholesale showroom. In 1957, Brendle began publishing the company's first catalog.

At its peak in 1990, Brendle's had 3,000 employees, and 58 stores.

The company filed for Chapter 11 bankruptcy protection in 1992, closing six stores. Douglas Brendle retired in 1995.

Brendle's then filed for Chapter 11 for a second time in April 1996. The company, whose struggles mirrored Service Merchandise, pared down to 12 stores and tried to refocus on home goods, crafts and party items while eliminating consumer electronics, toys and sporting goods. However, realizing that there wasn't nearly enough time for the new strategy to take hold, company officials ultimately decided to go out of business in December.
