= Consumers Distributing =

Defunct retail company

- Company type: Private (1957–1969); Public (1969–1996)
- Industry: Catalogue store
- Founded: 1957
- Founder: Jack Stupp
- Defunct: 1996
- Fate: Filed for bankruptcy
- Headquarters: 6303 Airport Road; Mississauga, Ontario, Canada
- Number of locations: 243 (Canada); 217 (United States)
- Key people: Jack Stupp (President)
- Products: Seasonal goods, jewellery, appliances, kitchenware, personal care, discount furniture, electronics, toys
- Parent: Oshawa Group (1969–1987); Provigo (1987–1993); Ackermans & van Haaren (1993–1996)

Consumers Distributing (known in Quebec as Distribution aux Consommateurs, and informally as Consumers) was a catalogue store in Canada and the United States that operated from 1957 to 1996. At its peak, the company operated 243 outlets in Canada and 217 in the United States; these included stores in every province in Canada and in the states of New Hampshire, Massachusetts, Connecticut, New York, New Jersey, Pennsylvania, Maryland, California and Nevada.

Consumers Distributing aimed to reduce costs for customers by stocking merchandise in a warehouse-type stocking system instead of displaying them in a costly showroom. Customers made their selections from a catalogue, filled out a form listing the items they wanted, then waited for stock staff to retrieve the items from the warehouse. The business model of Consumers Distributing has been described as "Internet shopping before the Internet".

== History ==
The first Consumers Distributing store was opened in 1957 by Jack Stupp and Sydney Druckman in Toronto. The company was taken public in 1969. In 1978, Oshawa Group sold the 50% interest it had acquired. In 1988, revenues topped $1 billion.

Consumers Distributing purchased the 42-store Cardinal Distributors catalogue chain from Steinberg Inc. and the 70-store American chain Consumers from May Department Stores, bringing its total store count to approximately 400 in 1981.

During the 1980s, Consumers Distributing built a chain of toy stores called Toy City (Toyville in Quebec). In 1990 and 1991, some stores became Toy City/Consumers Distributing stores. They closed in the mid-1990s.

Consumers Distributing was bought by the Quebec-based grocery retailer Provigo in 1987, then was sold in 1993 to a group controlled by Ackermans & van Haaren, a Belgian holding company.

In the 1990s, Consumers Distributing struggled to compete with Zellers and then Walmart Canada. Consumers Distributing sought bankruptcy protection in 1996.

Ten years following the bankruptcy, former Consumers Distributing employee Marc King relaunched the company as an online retailer. The new Consumers Distributing website operated in the run up to the 2012 holiday season, taking orders for furniture and brand-name electronics. However, the site was shuttered in January 2013. King was accused of owing back wages to employees. In May 2015, the company was issued a compliance order by Consumer Protection B.C. for deceptive acts and practices and for failing to issue refunds. The regulator reopened the investigation in October 2016 when it received a new complaint, noting that the company still had not paid penalties from the prior investigation.

== Store format ==
The main focus of the retailer was jewellery, appliances, kitchenware, toys, personal care, discount furniture, electronics and seasonal goods. The retail store layout consisted of a series of glass cabinets that displayed merchandise. Customers were for the most part required to select their products from catalogues that were located throughout the store, filling out a request form for the item they desired. This form was given to a store clerk and processed for fulfilment, with the goods stored in non-public space in a warehouse system stock area, behind the counters.

There were two main catalogue launches per year, with seasonal mini-catalogues issued more frequently to highlight certain items. The entire line changed twice a year with few exceptions. New items were introduced only with a new catalogue. A few specialty lines, such as batteries, film and some jewellery lines on counter racks, and were not found in the catalogue. Photo processing was another service available in many stores.

== Competitors and similar retailers ==
Hudson's Bay Company, which operates Canadian department stores under The Bay and (formerly) Zellers names, acquired the small Shop-Rite catalogue chain in 1972 and quickly expanded it in an attempt to compete with Consumers Distributing. The chain never reached profitability, and ceased operations in 1982.

American competition was mainly from the catalogue showroom retail store chains Best Products (also known simply as Best) and Service Merchandise. Both Best Products and Service Merchandise ultimately declared bankruptcy and ceased operations.

== Business model issues and attempts to address them ==
Consumers Distributing was plagued by the perception that items were frequently out of stock due to the catalogue shopping nature of the store. With the catalogue concept, the customer selected the item either at home while looking through the company's catalogue, or by a group of catalogues in the showroom of every store. It was not uncommon for a customer to wait in line only to be told by a clerk that the merchandise was not in stock. In 1984, a concept called the Flashboard was introduced. The Flashboard was a steel bulletin board with magnetic catalogue numbers for out of stock items. Customers were able to look at the Flashboard for their item and if it was listed, they knew that it was out of stock and they did not have to wait in line. This concept was used in some New York and New Jersey stores before computerization became mainstream.

Consumers Distributing undertook several initiatives to dispel this out-of-stock perception, including "super stores" that had all of the in-stock products on display, and free home delivery or store to store transfer for items that were not in stock. It also implemented a state-of-the-art inventory system that could check the availability of other stores in real time, and also would suggest alternate products at the store which were in stock.

Consumers Distributing was one of the first to implement real-time stock checking and prepayment for products available at other branches and the main warehouse. These initiatives, including the superstore expansion, costly free delivery, and costly new inventory management software, overextended the company.

High operating expenses, increasing competition, changing retailing trends (such as warehouse format stores), deflation in several product categories (jewellery and electronics), a deep lingering recession and the expansion of Walmart into Canada all contributed to the company's bankruptcy in 1996.

== Corporate offices ==
Consumers Distributing's final Canadian headquarters was located at 6303 Airport Road, in Mississauga, Ontario.

== See also ==
- List of Canadian department stores
- Service Merchandise — a defunct American company with similar business model
