= Nuala Archer =

American poet (born 1955)

Nuala Archer (born 1955) is an American poet of Irish descent, author of five books, most recently, Inch Aeons (Les Figues Press, 2006). Her first book, Whale on the Line, won the Patrick Kavanagh Poetry Award in 1980. She has published poems in literary journals and magazines including The American Poetry Review, Mid-American Review and Seneca Review. Until 2011, she was an associate professor in the English Department at Cleveland State University. During the 1990s, she briefly served as the director of Cleveland State University Poetry Center. She has taught literature and edited the Midland Review at Oklahoma State University. She has also taught at Yale University and Albertus Magnus College. She was educated at Wheaton College in Illinois (see List of Wheaton College (Illinois) alumni), Trinity College Dublin and the University of Wisconsin-Milwaukee. Born in Rochester, New York to Irish parents, her family moved to Canada, Costa Rica, Ecuador and Panama.

== Published works ==
- Inch Aeons (Les Figues Press, 2006)
- From a Mobile Home (Salmon Poetry, 1995)
- The Hour of Pan/Amá (Salmon Publishing, 1992)
- Two Women, Two Shores:Poems by Medbh McGuckian and Nuala Archer (New Poets Series/Salmon Press, 1989)
- Whale on the Line (Gallery Books, 1981)
