= NOOMA =

Film series

NOOMA is a series of 24 short films (less than 14 minutes each) produced by Flannel that "blend [events of] everyday with discussion about God". The name NOOMA comes from a phonetic spelling of the Greek word πνευμα (pneuma), meaning "wind or spirit". The video series consists of 24 videos created featuring Christian teacher Rob Bell, which appeared from 2002 through 2009.

== Format ==
Each film is 10 to 14 minutes that blends events of everyday life with "discussion about God", each on a different topic, without a pre-planned order. Each short story covers a specific topic on a real-life situation, usually by relating the various experiences from a Christian perspective. Each NOOMA video features Rob Bell, the author of Love Wins, who was pastor at Mars Hill Bible Church in Grandville, Michigan in 2011. The NOOMA videos are subtitled in English, Spanish, French, German, Portuguese, Mandarin and Korean. The executive director of Flannel, the producer of NOOMA, announced in 2009 plans to feature additional Christian teachers in future NOOMA films.

== Notable locations ==
Most NOOMAs featuring are shot on location in Western Michigan or the Chicago area. However, NOOMAs "Today | 017" and "Name | 018" were both filmed in the Jacksonville, Florida area. The Amway Grand Plaza Hotel is prominent in "Trees". A restaurant called The Rainbow Grill in Grandville, Michigan was used for "Sunday". The Gerald R. Ford International Airport is featured in "Luggage". The Van Andel Arena is featured in "Bullhorn". A beach along Lake Michigan is featured in "Kickball". "Breathe" is shot in the Lake station on the Red Line in downtown Chicago. "Open" was filmed at the new Metro Health Hospital in Wyoming, Michigan three months before the hospital opened its doors. "Shells" was filmed primarily at the Pew Campus of Grand Valley State University with several shots of Rob Bell sitting in the Steelcase Library.

== History ==
Originally, the non-profit company Flannel began making the NOOMA films in September 2001.. The first film in the series was titled "Rain", and was made in collaboration with co-writer and director Adam Stielstra and producer Brett Van Til. Stielstra was hired to develop a narrative formula and worked in collaboration with Rob Bell and Santino Stoner to successfully develop that formula and story structure from which all following Nooma films were based. Flannel was originally known as Fringe and is located in Grandville, Michigan. Since November 2002, Flannel has distributed the films through its website, NOOMA.com. A soundtrack featuring music from the first ten films (plus "Flowers" from 013) became available in December 2005 through NOOMA.com and digital music outlets.

In March 2005, Zondervan started distributing the series, making it available to retail markets. The entire look of the NOOMA series changed when Zondervan began distributing the films. Previously, the first 10 NOOMAs had been available as DVDs in clear and light blue plastic packaging. New packaging which accompanied the re-release of 001–010 and all subsequent episodes features a paper case and a 32-page discussion book. The books feature Scripture, stills from the film, questions related to the film's topic, and a single fun fact for each episode, usually about some production aspect of the film.

An app is also available for watching the NOOMA videos on both iOS and Android. The app was developed by Zondervan.

== NOOMA series ==
NOOMA premiered in November 2002. The last film was published July 2009. Twenty-four different films have been created, each with a different theme:

- 001 | Rain: "Things don't always work out the way we want them to."
- 002 | Flame: "What's up with the word love?"
- 003 | Trees: "Do our lives really matter?"
- 004 | Sunday: "Why do we do the things we do?"
- 005 | Noise: "Why is silence so hard to deal with?"
- 006 | Kickball: "Why can't we always have what we want?"
- 007 | Luggage: "It isn't always easy to forgive."
- 008 | Dust: "Does God believe in us?"
- 009 | Bullhorn: "Can we separate loving God and loving others?"
- 010 | Lump: "A lot of us have done things in our lives we are ashamed of."
- 011 | Rhythm: "What does it mean to have a relationship with God?"
- 012 | Matthew: "Suffering the loss of someone we love can be the most difficult thing in life to deal with."
- 013 | Rich: "Maybe God has blessed us with everything we have so we can bless and give to others."
- 014 | Breathe: "Our physical breath is actually a picture of a deeper spiritual reality."
- 015 | You: "Some of the central claims of the Christian faith are the source of many discussions and heated debates. But are we always debating the right things?"
- 016 | Store: "We all get angry about things from time to time."
- 017 | Today: "How much time and energy do we spend wishing things were how they used to be?"
- 018 | Name: "Why are we so concerned with what other people think, say, or look like?"
- 019 | Open: "What if there’s more to prayer than just God listening and answering?"
- 020 | Shells: "What are we really doing with our time?"
- 021 | She: "When we omit the feminine, are we missing a very fundamental part of God's nature?"
- 022 | Tomato: "Do we try so hard to live the perfect life that we miss out on how to truly live?"
- 023 | Corner: "Why is it that often when we get what we want, we still feel empty?"
- 024 | Whirlwind: "What do we do when there aren't nice, neat answers?"

== Soundtrack ==
Music from the first ten NOOMA videos were released the soundtrack NOOMA Soundtrack | Volume 001 in December 2005. It features Brie Stoner and David Vandervelde, both independent artists that are not employed by NOOMA.

Track #	Name	Artist	NOOMA Video
01	Come Down	Brie Stoner	Rain
02	History	David Vandervelde	Rain
03	Indiana	David Vandervelde	Flame
04	Yum Choi Bo Ram	David Vandervelde	Flame
05	All My Prayers	David Vandervelde	Trees
06	Son of Gold	David Vandervelde	Sunday
07	Slaves	Brie Stoner	Noise
08	Can You Love Me	Brie Stoner	Kickball
09	Instrumental	David Vandervelde	Luggage
10	Wait	Brie Stoner	Dust
11	Cheap	Brie Stoner	Bullhorn
12	Heaven Weeps	David Vandervelde	Bullhorn
13	Flowers	David Vandervelde	Rich

The later NOOMA videos feature music that is not on the soundtrack:

NOOMA Video	Artist	Name
Lump	The Album Leaf	Over the Pond
Rhythm	David Vandervelde	Moonlight (Instrumental)
Matthew	The Album Leaf	Window
NOOMA Trailer	Aphex Twin	Girl / Boy
