= Gerald McKenny =

American theologian

Gerald McKenny is an American theologian, and has served as the Walter Professor at University of Notre Dame since 2011. His teaching and writing are focused on Christian ethics and political theology, especially the ethics of Karl Barth and issues in biomedical ethics. He has been on the faculty at Notre Dame since 2001. Previously he was an assistant and later associate professor of religious studies at Rice University from 1989 to 2001.

== Education ==
- B.A., Wheaton College (Illinois) 1979
- M.Div., Princeton Theological Seminary, 1982
- Ph.D., University of Chicago, 1989
