= Rob Bell =

American author & pastor (born 1970)

Robert Holmes Bell Jr.
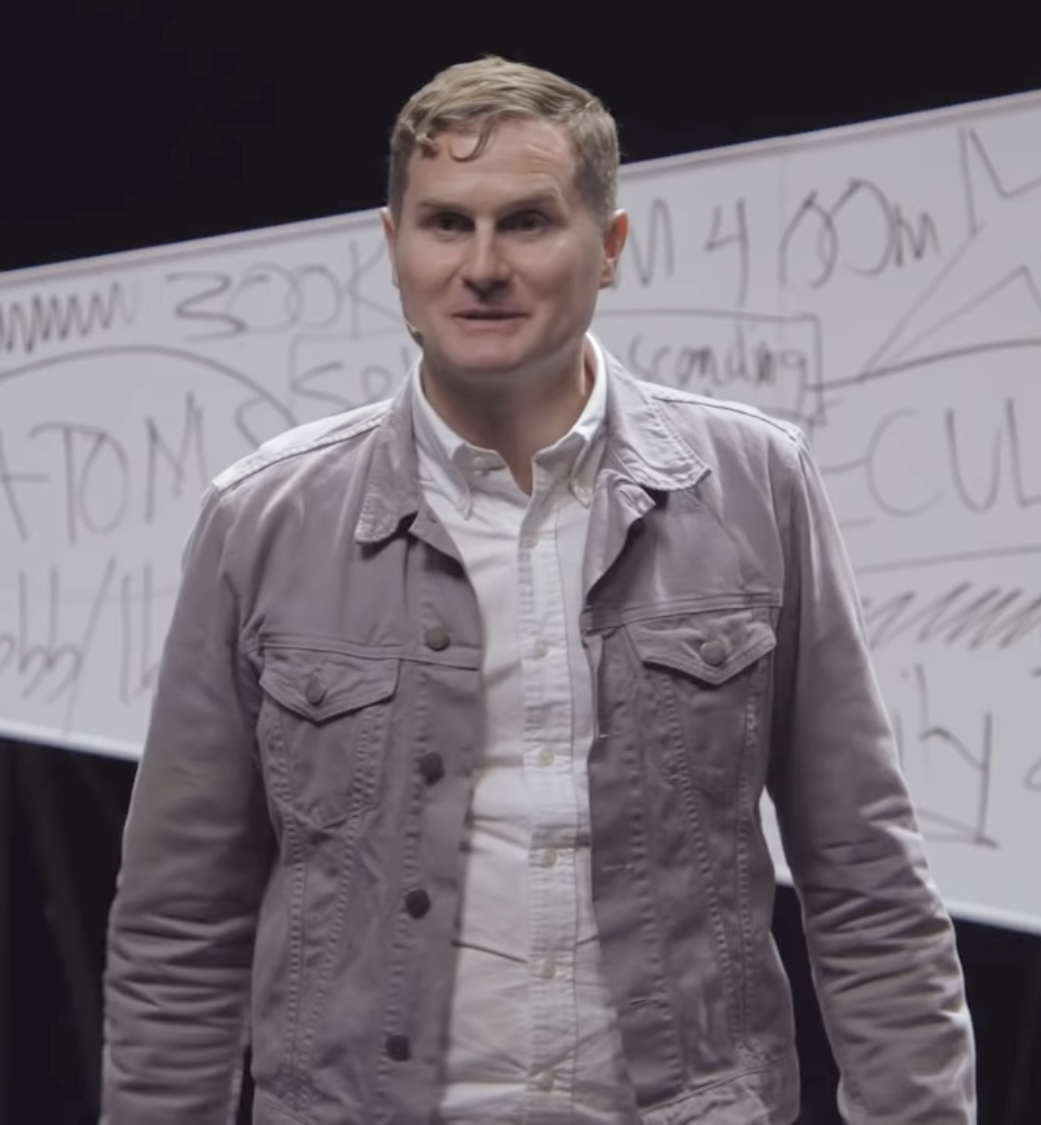
- Bell on "Everything is Spiritual" tour in 2016
- Born: August 23, 1970 (age 56)
- Education: Wheaton College (B.A. 1992); Fuller Theological Seminary (M.Div. 1995)
- Known for: writing Love Wins, founding Mars Hill Bible Church
- Father: Robert Holmes Bell
- Honours: Time 100 (2011)

Robert Holmes Bell Jr. (born 1970) is an American author, speaker, playwright, musician and former pastor. Bell founded Mars Hill Bible Church in Grandville, Michigan, and pastored it until 2012. Under his leadership, Mars Hill was one of the fastest-growing churches in America.

Bell is also the author of the New York Times bestseller Love Wins and the writer and narrator of a series of spiritual short films called NOOMA. In 2011, Time named Bell on its list of the 100 Most Influential People in the World. He has since become a freelance writer and speaker appearing on various talk shows and national speaking tours on topics related to spirituality and leadership. He also hosts a popular podcast called The Robcast. In 2018, a documentary about Bell called The Heretic was released.

== Biography ==
=== Early life and education ===
Bell is the son of U.S. District Judge Robert Holmes Bell, who was appointed to the federal bench by Ronald Reagan.

After graduating from High School, Bell attended Wheaton College, Illinois. While at Wheaton, he formed an alternative rock band called _Ton Bundle and taught water skiing at a Christian camp. At camp, he was asked to fill in as a replacement preacher. Bell received his bachelor's degree from Wheaton and also earned a Master of Divinity degree from Fuller Theological Seminary in Pasadena, California.

=== Mars Hill Bible Church ===
Bell and his wife moved from California to Grand Rapids to be close to family and on invitation to study under pastor Ed Dobson. He handled many of the preaching duties for the Saturday Night service at Calvary Church. Bell announced that he would be branching out on his own to start a new kind of community and would name it "Mars Hill" after the Greek site where the apostle Paul said: "For as I walked around and looked carefully at your objects of worship, I even found an altar with this inscription: TO AN UNKNOWN GOD. Now what you worship as something unknown I am going to proclaim to you."

In February 1999, Bell founded Mars Hill Bible Church, with the church originally meeting in a school gym in Wyoming, Michigan. Within a year the church was given a shopping mall in Grandville, Michigan, and purchased the surrounding land. In July 2000 the 3,500 "grey chair" facility opened its doors. As of 2005, an estimated 11,000 people attended the two "gatherings" on Sundays at 9 and 11 AM. As of March 2011, Sunday attendance numbered between 8,000 and 10,000. His teachings at Mars Hill inspired the popular "Love Wins" bumper sticker, and the congregation freely distributed these stickers after services.

In order to maintain balance in his life, Bell maintained his Fridays as a personal sabbath, where he did not allow contact by electronic means, and had all pastoral duties transferred to other Mars Hill pastors.

In the January 2007 issue of the magazine TheChurchReport.com, Bell was named No. 10 in its list of "The 50 Most Influential Christians in America" as chosen by their readers and online visitors.

Bell's 2011 book, Love Wins, caused controversy within evangelical circles because of its teachings about hell; that controversy caused thousands to leave Mars Hill and also led to Bell's departure. On September 22, 2011, Bell announced his resignation from Mars Hill Church to start "a spiritual talk show in Los Angeles".

=== Other projects ===
==== Pre-Mars Hill departure ====
Bell was the featured speaker in NOOMA, a series of short films. The title of the video series, "NOOMA", is an English representation of the Greek word pneuma, which means breath or spirit. All the videos feature the teachings of Bell accompanied by music written and sung by local independent artists (with the exception of The Album Leaf's music, which was licensed for the NOOMA DVD Lump).

In August 2005, Zondervan Publishing published Bell's first book, Velvet Elvis: Repainting the Christian Faith, which is, according to the official online summary, "for the millions of people who are fascinated by Jesus, but can't do the standard Christian package. In his debut book, Bell explores a new understanding of the Christian faith."

Bell's Everything is Spiritual national speaking tour launched on June 30, 2006, in Chicago. The proceeds from ticket sales were used to support WaterAid, an international non-profit organization dedicated to helping people escape the poverty and disease caused by living without safe water and sanitation.

Bell's second book, titled Sex God: Exploring the Endless Connections between Sexuality and Spirituality, was released in 2007. In June 2007, Bell toured the United Kingdom and Ireland with a series called Calling All Peacemakers. Bell launched another speaking tour in 2007, "The Gods Aren't Angry", which provided a narrative defense of justification through faith and not works.

Bell's 2009 project, Drops Like Stars, explores the links between creativity and suffering. Drops Like Stars was an international tour and a book, initially handwritten by Bell, with photographs. Bell looks at the creativity, empathy, new connections, and growth that can spring from suffering. When asked in an interview how he had become interested in suffering, Bell replied that as a pastor he had seen some of the most poignant moments of people's lives. At the same time he was lecturing on creativity and realized, "There was a connection between these two halves of my life – all these connections between suffering and art-making."

==== Post-Mars Hill departure ====
In July 2012, Bell held his first major event since leaving Mars Hill, speaking at the Viper Room night club in Los Angeles. Bell has hosted conferences and workshops in Laguna Beach for "leaders, teachers, preachers, entrepreneurs, artists, pastors—anyone whose work involves creating something and then turning it loose in the world."

In September 2013, Bell was interviewed by Oprah for her Super Soul Sunday television show. Bell's book, What We Talk About When We Talk About God, was also listed as the first recommended book that month in Oprah's "Book of the Month" club.

=== Television ===
Beginning in 2011, ABC television announced production of a new television drama, Stronger, co-written by Bell and Carlton Cuse, the executive producer of the television series Lost. The show, based loosely on Bell's life and his unpublished novel-turned-pilot-script, would follow the life of Tom Stronger, a musician on a spiritual journey. Ultimately, Bell and Cuse were unable to get approval to shoot a pilot for Stronger.

Bell and Cuse have moved on to another project described as a "faith-inflected talk show" presented by Bell. Two tapings of the proposed show were filmed in September 2012 in a warehouse in Los Angeles' art district in order to put together a reel for network executives. At the time, they were referenced as either That One Show Rob Bell and Carlton Cuse Have Been Working On, or The September Shows for short.

=== Podcast ===
Bell hosts a podcast called The Robcast. He is the only host, but is regularly joined by guests. Bell believes that "churches and denominations are waning" and that the medium of podcasting provides freedom to learn and grow spiritually without the hindrances of institutions. It was called the best religion and spirituality podcast of 2015 on iTunes. Juliana Chan Erikson of the World Magazine, questioned the direction that podcasts like The Robcast steers their audiences.

== Beliefs ==
In his writings, Bell says, "I affirm the truth anywhere in any religious system, in any worldview. If it's true, it belongs to God."

Bell's 2011 book, Love Wins, caused a major controversy within the evangelical community. The controversy was the subject of a Time magazine cover story and a featured article in The New York Times. In the book, Bell states that "It's been clearly communicated to many that this belief (in hell as eternal, conscious torment) is a central truth of the Christian faith and to reject it is, in essence, to reject Jesus. This is misguided and toxic and ultimately subverts the contagious spread of Jesus' message of love, peace, forgiveness and joy that our world desperately needs to hear." In this book, Bell outlines a number of views of hell, including universal reconciliation. Though he does not choose any one view as his own, he states "Whatever objections a person may have of [the universalist view], and there are many, one has to admit that it is fitting, proper, and Christian to long for it."

The book was criticized by numerous conservative evangelical figures (in particular, some reformed church leaders), such as Albert Mohler, John Piper, and David Platt, with Mohler saying that the book was "theologically disastrous" for not rejecting universalism. Other religious leaders, such as Brian McLaren, Greg Boyd and Eugene Peterson defended Bell's views. Bell denies that he is a universalist and says that he does not embrace any particular view but argues that Christians should leave room for uncertainty on the matter. As Jon Meacham stated, Love Wins presents [Bell's] "case for living with mystery rather than demanding certitude." Some evangelicals argued that this "uncertainty" is incompatible with Scripture, while others say that the book is simply promoting overdue conversation about some traditional interpretations of Scripture. In the book, Bell also questions "evacuation theology" which has Christians focused on getting to heaven, instead of focusing on God's renewal and transformation of this world. Bell argues that Jesus (and the wider Jewish tradition of which he was a part) focused on God's ongoing restoration of this world, not getting individuals to heaven.

At his Viper Room appearance in July 2012, Bell took a question from an audience member concerned about the church's acceptance of gay members. Said Bell, "Some people are gay, and you're our brothers and you're our sisters, and we love you. We love you... [Gay people] are passionate disciples of Jesus just like I'm trying to be, so let's all get together and try to do something about the truly big problems in our world." On March 17, 2013, in an interview at Grace Cathedral in San Francisco, Bell said, "I am for marriage. I am for fidelity. I am for love, whether it's a man and a woman, a woman and a woman, a man and a man... And I think the ship has sailed. This is the world we are living in and we need to affirm people wherever they are."

In March 2013, Bell expressed frustration with the state of conservative evangelicalism, calling it "a very narrow, politically intertwined, culturally ghettoized Evangelical subculture." He says that Evangelicals have "turned away lots of people" from the church by talking about God in ways that "don't actually shape people into more loving, compassionate people," adding that Evangelicals "have supported policies and ways of viewing the world that are actually destructive, and we've done it in the name of God and we need to repent."

In 2018, a documentary about Bell called The Heretic was released.

== Awards and recognition ==
In June 2011, Bell was named by Time Magazine as one of the "2011 Time 100", the magazine's annual list of the 100 most influential people in the world.

== Publications ==
=== Novels ===
- Millones Cajones: A Novel. 2015.
- Book One: Welcome to Firdus. Where'd You Park Your Spaceship?: An Interplanetary Tale of Love, Loss, and Bread. California: BackHouse Books. 2023.
- Book Two: There's Only One Noon Yeah. Where'd You Park Your Spaceship?: An Interplanetary Tale of Love, Loss, and Bread. California: BackHouse Books. 2024.

=== Plays ===
- What's a Knucka?: A Play. BackHouse Books. 2022.
- We'll Get Back to You: A Play. BackHouse Books. 2022.

=== Sole-authored books ===
- Velvet Elvis: Repainting the Christian Faith. Grand Rapids: Zondervan. 2005.
- Sex God: Exploring the Endless Connections Between Sexuality and Spirituality. Grand Rapids: Zondervan. 2007.
- Drops Like Stars: A Few Thoughts on Creativity and Suffering. Grand Rapids: Zondervan. 2010.
- David Vanderveen, ed. (2011). Love wins: A Book About Heaven, Hell and the Fate of Every Person Who Ever Lived. San Francisco: HarperOne.
- Love Wins: Enhanced Edition. New York: Collins. 2012.
- Love Wins: For Teens. New York: HarperCollins. 2013.
- What We Talk About When We Talk About God: Finding a New Faith for the Twenty-First Century. Glasgow: William Collins. 2014.
- How to Be Here: A Guide to Creating a Life Worth Living. San Francisco: HarperOne. 2017.
- What is the Bible? How an Ancient Library of Poems, Letters, and Stories Can Transform the Way You Think and Feel About Everything. San Francisco: HarperOne. 2017.
- Everything is Spiritual: Who We Are and What We're Doing Here. New York: St Martin's Essentials. 2020.

=== Co-authored books ===
- Rob Bell; Don Golden (2008). Jesus Wants to Save Christians: A Manifesto for the Church in Exile. Grand Rapids: Zondervan.
- Rob Bell; Kristen Bell (2014). The Zimzum of Love: A New Way of Understanding Marriage. San Francisco: HarperOne.

=== Study guides ===
- Collection 001: Book 001-004. Nooma. Grand Rapids: Zondervan. 2010.
- Collection 002: Book 005-008. Nooma. Grand Rapids: Zondervan. 2010.
- David Vanderveen, ed. (2012). The Love Wins Companion: A Study Guide For Those Who Want to God Deeper. New York: HarperCollins.

=== Anthologies ===
- The Rob Bell Reader: Selection from Love Wins, Velvet Elvis, Sex God, Drops like Stars, and Jesus Wants to Save Christians. New York: HarperCollins. 2012.
- Love Wins and The Love Wins Companion. New York: HarperCollins. 2013.
- The Complete Rob Bell: His Seven Bestselling Books, All in One Place. New York: HarperCollins. 2013.

=== DVDs ===
- Everything is Spiritual [2006 Tour Film]. 2006.
- The God's Aren't Angry [Tour Film]. 2008.
- Drops Like Stars [Tour Film]. 2010.
- Everything is Spiritual [2016 Tour Film]. 2016.

=== Audio Series ===
- Find Me a Straight River [A 3 hour audiobook on fear and failure].
- Handling Your Fire: Passion, Burnout, Routines and Resilience [6 hour audiobook].
- Grabbin' the Bag: A Few Thoughts on Money [3 hour audiobook].
- Something to Write [4 hour audio].
- The Holy Shift Tour.
- Launching Rockets: 17 Observations on Being a Parent.
- Something to Say [7 hour audio].
- Blood, Guts & Fire: The Gospel According to Leviticus.
- Rob Bell and Richard Rohr (2015). In the Beginning [Six hours with Rob Bell and Richard Rohr on reclaiming the original Christian narrative] (Lecture).

== See also ==
- Religion and spirituality podcast
- Wellman Jr, J. K. (2012). Rob Bell and a New American Christianity. Abingdon Press.
- Willey, R. D. (2019). Shifting the sacred: Rob Bell and the postconservative evangelical turn. Critical Research on Religion, 7(1), 80-99.
