= Edward Breathitte Sellers =

Edward Breathitte Sellers is the first known college graduate of color of Wheaton College and one of the first African American graduates in the state of Illinois.

Edward Breathitte Sellers was said to have been born in Mississippi around 1842. Born and reared in slavery, somehow prior to his matriculating at Wheaton College, he moved to Illinois and listed Shawneetown, Illinois as his home. He appears in the 1860 census for DuPage county and is listed as a laborer. His race is noted as white.

Initially in 1860, he began studies in the Preparatory program as a junior student and progressed to senior standing the following year. In the 1862 Wheaton College Catalog, he is shown to have entered the Collegiate program and is listed as a Freshman.

That same year he joined the Beltionian Literary Society. Founded in 1856, the crimson-clad Belts championed the cause of "striving for the greater and better." It was in the literary society that Sellers was able to hone his oral and written communication skills as he debated his fellow students on topics ranging from economics to ethics, such as the lawfulness of slavery. Sellers held leadership positions within the society and gained a reputation as “one of the leading disputants” on campus.

During his junior year at Wheaton College, Sellers joined several of his classmates and heeded the call of the Union Army for "hundred-days men." Sellers, along with his friends, enlisted May 18, 1864 in the 132nd Illinois Volunteer Infantry Regiment. This regiment was organized at Camp Fry, Chicago, Illinois, and mustered in for 100 days service from June 1, 1864. and encamped and trained near Paducah, Kentucky – not far from his Shawneetown home. Sellers didn't seem to have seen any skirmishes. He was mustered out October 17, 1864.

After his summer soldiering, Sellers returned to school and graduated in 1866, the sole graduate that year. With the help of Wheaton's president, Jonathan Blanchard, Sellers moved to Boston and enrolled at Andover Theological Seminary. The 1870 census for Suffolk county, Massachusetts lists Sellers as white and working as a store clerk. He is listed in the junior class in the 1872 Congregational Quarterly. He earned his bachelor of divinity in 1874 and was ordained that November at the Congregational Church in Selma, Alabama. Afterwards, he was appointed by the American Missionary Association to a pastorate in Chattanooga, Tennessee.

After two years in this pastorate, Sellers' life takes a twist and begins to become unclear. In 1876, he moved back to Boston for a year. From 1877-1883 he lived in Taunton and Worcester, Massachusetts. The 1880 census for Taunton county lists Sellers as a black patient in the Taunton Lunatic Asylum suffering from "mania." He was known to have died of "insanity" at 41 years of age on June 4, 1883 in Worcester.
