= Catalog merchant =

Form of retailing

A catalog merchant (catalogue merchant in Commonwealth English) or catalog showroom is a form of retailing in which consumers select items from a catalog, inspect display samples in a public showroom, then submit written orders for immediate fulfillment from an attached warehouse which is closed to the public. The typical catalog merchant sells a wide variety of household and personal products, with many emphasizing jewelry. Unlike most retail formats, the vast majority of the merchandise remains in the warehouse space and is therefore immune to shoplifting because it cannot be touched by consumers outside of the presence of a cashier.

== Description ==
This retail format flourished in the 1970s as an attempt to combine the atmosphere of a department store with the convenience of reviewing a mail order catalog at one's leisure and the convenience and savings to be obtained from buying at a local discount store.

A consumer can search a mail order catalog for a particular product much more efficiently than walking around a department store and speaking with salespersons, but mail order has the drawbacks of very high per-item shipping costs, very slow fulfillment, and the inability to inspect the product until it arrives. Discount stores usually place their merchandise on self-service shelves open to the public where consumers can inspect the goods and then purchase and carry away a desired product that very day, but they suffer greatly from shoplifting. Full-service department stores provide a pleasant shopping atmosphere and have salespersons on the floor to provide quick service, but the consumer then has to deal with salespersons' tactics (e.g., hard sell, soft sell) and must pay higher prices to cover all that overhead.

A catalog showroom avoids all these issues. The consumer first searches the catalog at home at their leisure, and identifies products to see in person. The consumer then visits a local catalog showroom to inspect display samples of those products. The showroom is a retail environment which tries to reproduce the ambience of a department store on a much smaller scale, except with a smaller range of products. The consumer fills out and submits a written order form with catalog numbers corresponding to desired items. A clerk retrieves packaged products corresponding to those order numbers from an backroom warehouse space which is not open to the public and delivers them immediately to an on-site pickup counter.

== Purpose ==
The catalog merchant has generally lower prices than other retailers and lower overhead expenses due to the smaller store size and lack of large showroom space.

There are a few key benefits to this retail format. By operating as an in-store catalog sales center, it could be exempt from the "resale price maintenance" policy of the manufacturers, which can force conventional retailers to charge a minimum sales price to prevent price-cutting competition.

Because the consumer cannot touch packaged merchandise outside of the presence of a cashier, it also reduces the risk of losses to shoplifting, known in the industry as shrinkage. Display samples are still at risk for shrinkage, but are usually mounted or displayed in such a way that a thief who takes them will draw unwanted attention (for example, shattering glass to reach inside a cabinet).

From the consumer's point of view, there are potential advantages and disadvantages. The biggest advantage is that the catalog showroom tries to bring the warehouse to the consumer, so consumers can avoid the high per-item shipping costs associated with traditional mail-order catalogs and the high overhead of traditional full-service department stores. Catalogs traditionally emphasized such savings by showing the purported manufacturer "list price" versus the catalog price. The consumer can inspect display samples in the showroom before making a decision, rather than have to guess from a printed catalog alone whether the product is appropriate for their needs.

Another advantage is that a consumer can shop all over a store without having to carry with them everything they want to buy. Instead, they just write down catalog numbers on a form and then pay for and collect everything at the end.

Disadvantages include having to disclose contact information when placing an order, taking the time to fill out order forms, and having to wait some period of time for an order to be fulfilled as a clerk searches the attached warehouse.

If an item is not in stock in the attached warehouse, then the catalog showroom may have to submit a mail order and then it becomes just as slow and expensive as traditional mail order.

Another disadvantage is the risk of discovering that the actual item delivered has sustained in-transit damage and is not identical to the defect-free item on display. In a self-service retail store, a consumer can closely examine several product boxes at their leisure before taking the most pristine one to the cashier, but in a catalog showroom, such a detailed examination is not practical, especially if a consumer has already waited for a long period of time for retrieval of that item and there are several other customers in line waiting for their orders.

== Countries ==
=== Canada ===
Consumers Distributing operated over 400 stores in Canada and the United States, and closed in 1996. Competitors in the Montreal area included Cardinal Distributors (launched by Steinberg but sold to Consumers Distributing in 1979) and Unique (folded in the 1970s). Shop-Rite, which operated 65 stores in Ontario, closed its doors in 1982. Sears Canada Inc still issues over 15 printed catalogues every year. Included in these (15) printed catalogues are three (3) large catalogues - the Spring and Summer Catalogue, the Fall and Winter General Catalogue, and the popular Christmas WishBook catalogue. In fall 2012, Sears Canada catalogue issued its 60th anniversary WishBook edition.

=== United Kingdom ===
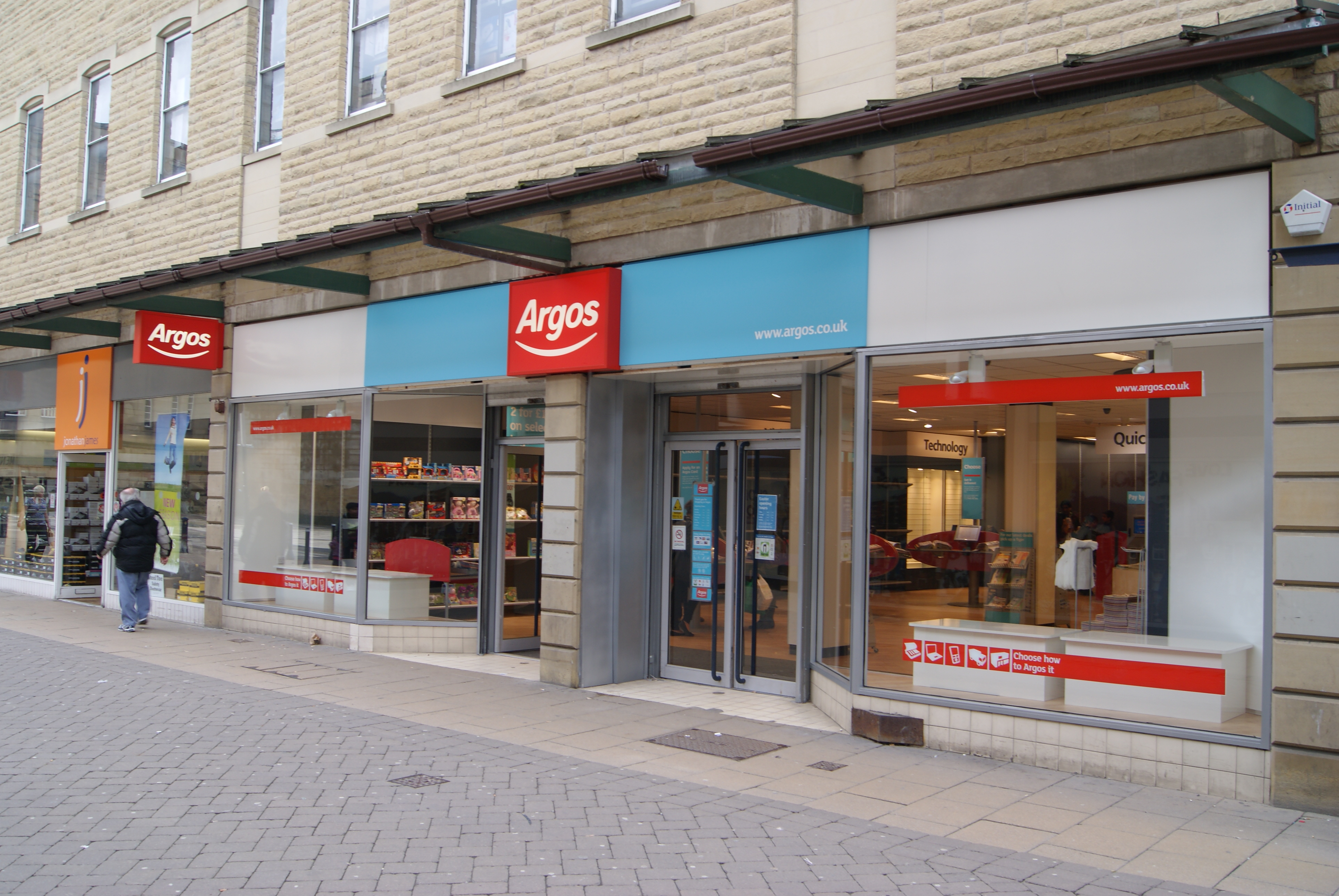
A smaller branch of Argos in Huddersfield, West Yorkshire, Argos is the largest catalogue retailer in the United Kingdom.

In the United Kingdom, the sole national general goods catalogue merchant left in the high street market is Argos. Former catalogue retailers include Littlewoods, which owned the 'Index' brand as a high street competitor to Argos and Kays, which unlike Argos and Littlewoods/Index had no shops and sold only by postal orders. Littlewoods, Kays and existing Grattan built their businesses around offering credit, however in the 21st century most High Street shops now offer store cards (a means of credit specific to the retailer) meaning these catalogues have lost some of their market niche.

Littlewoods also ran a smaller catalogue that did not offer credit called Index. Unlike goods from the Littlewoods Catalogue, which were purchased via postal order, Index goods could be purchased at Index branches and some branches of the Littlewoods department stores.

Unlike Littlewoods, Kays and Grattan, who focused mainly on Clothing, Argos (and formerly Index) focus primarily on furniture, electronics and white goods. In 2001, Argos started a clothing catalogue called Argos Additions, however they sold the brand to Shop Direct Group in 2004.

In 2021, Argos ceased production of its printed catalogue, but an electronic catalogue can be browsed in-store as well as online.

=== United States ===
Catalog merchants in the United States have declined since 1980, in favor of chain discounters, big box stores, and internet shopping. Prominent among catalog merchants during the 19th and 20th centuries were Belknap Hardware and Manufacturing Company and Sears, Roebuck & Company.

The repeal of the resale price maintenance sanctioning law in 1980 meant that chain discounters such as Wal-Mart and KMart could set and change prices at will, in a more consumer-friendly environment where the customer can examine the goods and confirm availability before approaching sales staff. As a result, this retail sector went into decline in the 1980s. As big box stores and internet shopping became increasingly popular in the 1990s, the decline of the catalog merchant business accelerated.

Many companies in recent years have moved away from relying solely on catalog sales, augmenting them with online sales or direct retail. The move toward online sales includes long-established department store chains such as Sears and JCPenney that relied heavily on catalog sales. However, many long-established catalog merchants have gone out of business since the 1980s, including Best Products, Brendle's, Ellman's, Jafco, KeyMid, Montgomery Ward, Rink's, Aldens, H. J. Wilson Co., Service Merchandise, Sterling Jewelry & Distributing Company and Consumers Distributing. The Houston Jewelry & Distributing Company division of Sterling Jewelry & Distributing Company was successfully reconfigured as a full service fine jewelry and gift store in 1993 and has been in operation ever since. Houston Jewelry remains the only former catalog showroom to successfully return to a traditional jewelry format.
