= Jay P. Greene =

Jay P. Greene is a senior research fellow at The Heritage Foundation, an American right-wing think tank. He was previously a distinguished professor and head of the Department of Education Reform at the University of Arkansas.

Greene writes about and researches education. His research was cited four times in the U.S. Supreme Court's opinions in the Zelman v. Simmons-Harris case on school vouchers.

Greene has written several books: Education Myths (Rowman & Littlefield, 2005), Why America Needs School Choice (Encounter Broadside, 2011) and co-editor of Failure Up Close: What Happens, Why It Happens, and What We Can Learn from It (Rowman & Littlefield, 2018) and Religious Liberty and Education: A Case Study of Yeshivas vs. New York (Rowman & Littlefield, 2020).

== Education ==
Greene graduated from Tufts University with a B.A in History, then Harvard University with an A.M. then Ph.D in Political Science.

== Research ==
Greene's research addresses topics connected to education and schooling. Greene's work is often not peer-reviewed, a practice which has attracted public criticism by other researchers such as Edward Muir. Greene has critiqued the merit and utility of peer-review. Henry M. Levin has written that: "There tends to be an ideological dimension to his work that even very bright people, and maybe especially bright people, are susceptible to" while Gerald W. Bracey has suggested that Greene aims to get his "slanted statement into the press first. Once the damage is done, people will have a hard time getting the truth known." Rick Ayers, in a response to Greene's criticism of his own work, wrote that Greene "would stoop to ad hominem attacks, while claiming to argue for the high road."

Greene's articles include:

- Erickson, H.H., Watson A.R., & Greene, J.P. (Forthcoming). An Experimental Evaluation of Culturally Enriching Field Trips. Journal of Human Resources.
- Greene, J. P., Cheng, A., & Kingsbury I. (2021). Are Educated People More Anti-Semitic? Tablet Magazine, March 29.
- Greene, J.P., Erickson, H.H., Watson, A.R., & Beck, M.I. (2018). The Play’s the Thing: Experimentally Examining the Social and Cognitive Effects of School Field Trips to Live Theater Performances. Educational Researcher, 47(4), 246-254.
- Greene, J.P., & Kingsbury, I. (2017). The Relationship Between Public and Private Schooling and AntiSemitism. Journal of School Choice, 11(1), 111-130.
- Greene, J. P, Hitt, C., Kraybill, A., & Bogulski, C. A. (2015). Learning from live theater. Education Next, 15(1), 54-61.
- Kisida, B., Greene, J. P., & Bowen, D. H. (2014). Creating cultural consumers: The dynamics of cultural capital acquisition, Sociology of Education, 87(4), 281-295.
- Greene, J. P., Kisida, B., & Bowen, D. H. (2014). The educational value of field trips. Education Next, 14(1), 78-86.
- Bowen, D. H., Greene, J. P., & Kisida, B. (2014). Learning to think critically: A visual art experiment. Educational Researcher, 43(1), 37-44.
- Margulis, E. H., Kisida, B., & Greene, J. P. (2013). A knowing ear: The effect of explicit information on children’s experience of a musical performance. Psychology of Music, Advance online publication. 1-10.
- Bowen, D. H., & Greene, J. P. (2012). Does athletic success come at the expense of academic success?. Journal of Research in Education, 22(2), 1-22.
- Winters, M. A., & Greene, J. P. (2012). The medium-run effects of Florida’s test-based promotion policy. Education Finance and Policy, 7(3), 305-330.
- Winters, M. A., Dixon, B. L., & Greene, J. P. (2012). Observed characteristics and teacher quality: Impacts of sample selection on a value added model. Economics of Education Review, 31(1), 19-32.
- Winters, M. A., & Greene, J. P. (2011). Public school response to special education vouchers: The impact of Florida’s McKay Scholarship Program on disability diagnosis and student achievement in public schools. Educational Evaluation and Policy Analysis, 33(2), 138-158.
- Greene, J. P. (2011). The Big Rock Candy Mountain of education. In G. Forster & C. B. Thompson (Eds.), Freedom and School Choice in American Education (pp. 1-16). New York, NY: Palgrave Macmillan.
- Greene, J. P., & Winters, M. A. (2011). Florida’s program to end social promotion. In D. L. Leal & C. B. Thompson (Eds.), The politics of Latino education (pp. 58-71). New York, NY: Teachers College Press.
- Winters, M. A., Trivitt, J. R., & Greene, J. P. (2010). The impact of high-stakes testing on student proficiency in low-stakes subjects: Evidence from Florida’s elementary science exam. Economics of Education Review, 29(1), 138-146.
