= POB =

POB or Pob may refer to:

- Parti Ouvrier Belge (Belgian Workers Party), forerunner of the Socialist Party (Belgium)
- Place of birth
- Poblacion or Pop, a term for the central business district of a Philippine city
- Positive Organizational Behavior, an application of psychology
- Post office box
- Professional Oversight Board, independent oversight of professional organizations in the United Kingdom

== Entertainment ==
- Paris Opera Ballet
- Pob, central character of Pob's Programme, a British children's TV programme (ran 1985–1990)
- Patrick O'Brian, novelist and author
- "Pob", an episode of Folklore

== Maritime/aviation ==
- Pope Field (IATA: POB), Fayetteville, North Carolina, U.S., a military air base
- Personnel on board, an abbreviation in oil and gas exploration and production and in shipbuilding
- Person overboard, a gender-neutral equivalent of the expression "Man overboard"
- "Pilot on board", by which the time of the pilot's boarding the ship is understood
