= Witmark =

Former catalog showroom chain

Witmark Catalog Showrooms
- Company type: catalog showroom
- Industry: Retail
- Founded: 1969 (Grand Rapids)
- Founder: Paul Leven
- Defunct: 1997
- Fate: Liquidated
- Headquarters: Grand Rapids, Michigan
- Area served: Western Michigan
- Products: Jewelry, electronics, sporting goods, furniture, beauty products, housewares, toys.

Witmark was a catalog showroom and jewelry/electronics chain that operated in West Michigan from 1969 to 1997. The chain was founded by Paul Leven.

Over its nearly 30-year history, Witmark dominated the jewelry market with an average of a 34% market share. The organization made it a point to develop and keep close ties with the communities the stores served.

By the early 1990s, Witmark's earnings began to decrease due to continued involvement in unprofitable categories outside of jewelry. Big box stores such as Best Buy, Circuit City, Toys "R" Us, Dick's Sporting Goods, and MC Sports captured the electronics, toy, and sports markets respectively and more effectively than Witmark could.

In 1996, Witmark experienced its fourth consecutive year of declining sales and earnings, and the company announced changes to its operating strategy. Unfortunately, vast barriers—such as long-term leases on real estate—limited the company's ability to adapt to the changing business climate. The following year, Witmark liquidated its assets and laid off its 700+ employees. Like the larger national chains of catalog showrooms (such as Best Products), the retail concept collapsed in the late 1990s due to overwhelming competition from big box stores and Internet shopping.

== Image gallery ==
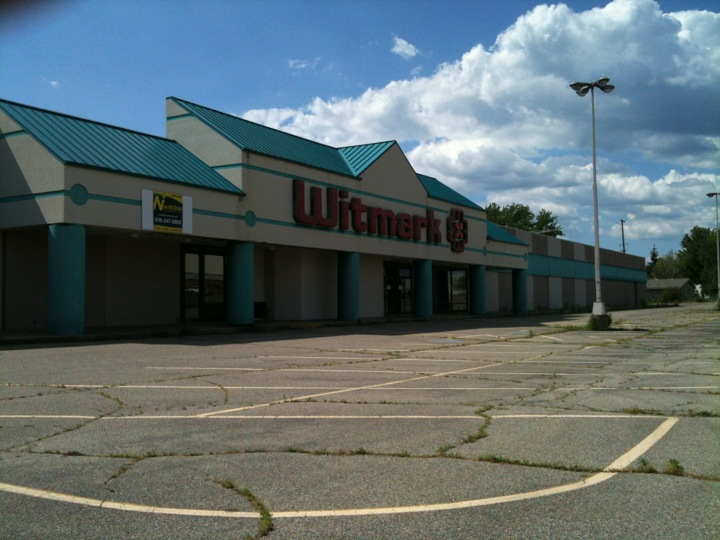
The Plainfield Township, MI Witmark Catalog Showroom. Opened 1969, demolished 2021.

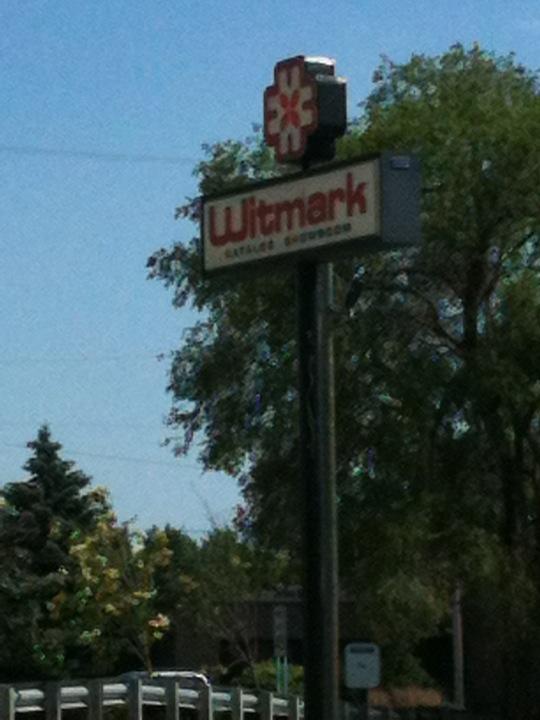
Store sign from Plainfield Ave.

Witmark catalog from the 1997 spring season.
