= Kenneth Pobo =

Kenneth George Pobo
- Born: August 24, 1954 (age 71)
- Occupation: Author - Poet - Professor
- Writing career
- Period: 1974 - present
- Subject: LGBTQ+ - Nature - Humanity
- Notable work: Uneven Steven - Bend of Quiet - Loplop in a Red City
- Notable awards: Moonstone Arts Chapbook prize (2019) - Winner of the Alabama State Poetry Society Chapbook Contest (2019)

Kenneth George Pobo (born August 24, 1954) is an American author, poet, and educator. He has received many awards throughout his career for his poetry and fiction, including the Moonstone Arts Chapbook Prize in 2019 and the Qarrtsiluni Poetry Chapbook Prize in 2011.

== Early life and education ==
Pobo began writing poetry in the summer of 1970, influenced by music of the late 1960s and early 1970s, as well as late and living poets of the time. He attended Wheaton College in Illinois, graduating in 1976. There, he began publishing his poetry in a number of literary magazines. He continued his education at the University of Wisconsin-Milwaukee. His master's thesis, completed in 1979, was his poetry manuscript entitled "Billions of Lit Cigarettes." His first volume of poetry, Musings from the Porchlit Sea, was published in 1979. He began work as a teaching assistant while at the University of Wisconsin-Milwaukee, where he earned his Ph.D. in English in 1983.

== Career ==
Pobo served as poetry editor of the Cream City Review of the University of Wisconsin between 1981 and 1983. From 1983-2020, he had several teaching appointments, beginning as an instructor at the University of Tennessee in Knoxville, Tennessee, until 1987. That year, he was hired as an assistant professor at Widener University in Chester, Pennsylvania. Between 1988 and 1993, he worked again as a poetry editor, this time for Widener Review. In 1991, he became an associate professor at Widener University, and in 2010, he was promoted to professor and remained in his position until he retired in 2020. He worked at Arcadia College during the summer of 1998. Throughout his years of teaching, Pobo focused on being student-centered, creating class discussions, and helping students write more clearly and effectively.

Pobo has published more than 25 books of poetry and short fiction in addition to numerous poems and flash fiction pieces in literary journals and magazines, such as Indiana Review, Mudfish, The Cider Press Review, The Fiddlehead, and Hawaii Review. His poetry is regarded for exploring thoughtful and provocative questions of survival, both of humanity and nature. His writing is not only elegant and readable, but also ethical and ironic, such as in his book Bend of Quiet. Pobo is also appreciated for his research in and writing of LGBTQIA+ literature, including for his book of poems, Uneven Steven.

Between 1998 and 2003, Pobo sat as a review board member for The Oswald Review at the University of South Carolina Aiken. He has conducted many presentations and poetry readings across the United States. He has also written a number of reviews for publications, as well as essays.

Since 2015, Pobo has been productive with book publications on an almost annual basis. His most recent book is It Gets Dark So Soon Now published by Broken Tribe Press, Raleigh, North Carolina.

== Personal life ==
Pobo enjoys spending weekends in his garden and listening to the Widecast Internet music show, Obscure Oldies. His favorite song of all time is "12:30 (Young Girls Are Coming To The Canyon)" by The Mamas & The Papas, released in 1967. Pobo is also a tie-dye enthusiast and on the matter says, "I love color and I want color to slide all over me. Clothes should dream in color. No more coffin-esque flat colors afraid of their own energy."

== Bibliography ==
=== Books ===
- Musings from the Porchlit Sea (Brandon Press, 1979)
- Ordering: A Season in My Garden (Higganum Hills Books, 2001)
- Introductions (Pearl's Book'Em Publisher, 2003)
- Glass Garden (WordTech Press, 2008)
- Bend of Quiet (Blue Light Press, 2015)
- Booking Rooms in the Kuiper Belt (Urban Farmhouse Press, 2015)
- Loplop in a Red City (Circling Rivers, 2017)
- The Atlantis Hit Parade (Clare Songbirds Press, 2019)
- Dindi Expecting Snow (Duck Lake Books, 2019)
- Wingbuds (Cyberwit.net, 2019)
- Uneven Steven (Assure Press, 2020)
- A Preliminary Vision Tested in the Flower (Cyberwit.net, 2021)
- Lilac and Sawdust (Meadowlark Books, 2021)
- Sore Points (Finishing Line Press, 2022)
- It Gets Dark So Soon Now (Broken Tribe Press, 2025)

=== Chapbooks ===
- Billions of Lit Cigarettes (Raw Dog Press, 1981)
- Evergreen (Bragdon Books, 1985)
- A Pause Inside Dusk (Song Press, 1986)
- Ferns on Fire (Nightshade Press, 1991)
- Yes: Irises (Singular Speech Press, 1992)
- Ravens and Bad Bananas (Osric Publishing, 1995)
- A Barbaric Yawp on the Rocks (Alpha Beat Press, 1996)
- Cicadas and Apple Trees (Palanquin Press, 1998)
- Open To All (2River View, 2000)
- Kenneth Pobo's Greatest Hits (Pudding House Press, 2002)
- Postcards from America (Tamafyhr Mountain Press, 2004)
- Crazy Cakes (Scars Publications, 2008)
- Something To Be Said (Flutter Press)
- Trina and the Sky (Main Street Rag Press, 2009)
- Fitting Parts (Philistine Press, 2010)
- Tea on Burning Glass (Tandava Poetry Press, 2010)
- Closer Walks (Thunderclap Press, 2011)
- Contralto Crows (Green Fuse Press, 2011)
- Tiny Torn Maps (Deadly Chaps, 2011)
- Ice and Gaywings (Phoenicia Press, 2011)
- Save My Place (Finishing Line Press, 2012)
- Placemats (Eastern Point Press, 2013)
- When The Light Turns Green (Spruce Alley Press, 2014)
- Highway Rain (Poet's Haven Press, 2015)
- Calligraphy With Ball (Encircle Press, 2017)
- Dust and Chrysanthemums (Grey Borders Books, 2017)
- Threads (Yavanika Press, 2019)
- Snowflake (Local Gems Poetry Press, 2019)
- Your Place or Mine (Alabama State Poetry Society, 2020)
- The Book of Micah (Moonstone Arts, 2020)
- Lavender Fire, Lavender Rose (Brick/House Books, 2021)
- Gold Bracelet in a Cave: Aunt Stokesia (Ethel Press, 2022)
- Raylene and Skip (Wolfson Press, 2025)

== Awards and honors ==
- 1979 Mae E. Gales Creative Writing Award
- 1998 Palanquin Press Poetry Chapbook Prize
- 2009 Main Street Rag Poetry Chapbook Prize
- 2010 Lindback Prize for Teaching Excellence
- 2011 Qarrtsiluni Poetry Chapbook Prize
- 2013 Eastern Point Press Chapbook Award
- 2016 LGBTQ Flash Fiction Prize, Sweater Weather Magazine, for "Evening Ritual"
- 2019 Alabama State Poetry Society's Morris Memorial Chapbook Award for Your Place or Mine
- 2019 Moonstone Arts Chapbook Prize for The Book of Micah
