= Mars Hill Bible Church =

Church in Grandville, Michigan, United States

- Mars Hill Bible Church
- Location: Grandville, Michigan
- Country: United States
- Denomination: non-denominational
- Website: marshill.org

History
- Founded: February 1999
- Founder: Rob Bell

Clergy
- Pastor: A.J. Sherrill (2016-2020) Ashlee Eiland (2021-present) Troy Hatfield (2021-present)

Mars Hill Bible Church is an American non-denominational Christian megachurch located in Grandville, Michigan near Grand Rapids. The teaching pastor was Rob Bell until December, 2011 when Bell transitioned into another ministry and was succeeded by his friend and fellow Mars Hill pastor Shane Hipps. In August 2012, the church announced to its members that Kent Dobson, son of well-known church leader and speaker Ed Dobson, would assume the position of teaching pastor. Dobson was then succeeded in August 2016 by AJ Sherrill, former pastor of Trinity Grace Church: Chelsea in NYC. In 2020, Sherrill departed from the church and in 2021 was succeeded by Ashlee Eiland and Troy Hatfield.

== History ==
Founded in February 1999, the church's services, or "gatherings", were originally held in a school gym in Wyoming, Michigan. Based on the idea that worship could be stripped down to its simplest form, it quickly grew in popularity. Through word-of-mouth and the launch support of Calvary Church in Grand Rapids, Michigan, the church attracted about 1,000 visitors to its first gathering. Within a year the church had the defunct Grand Village Mall donated to it and purchased the land on which it is now located in Grandville, Michigan. After some remodeling, the 3,500 seat facility opened its doors in July 2000. In the early 2000s, the church attracted around 6,000 churchgoers to its two Sunday services and had up to 50,000 downloads per week. Its current weekly attendance is around 2500.

== Leadership ==
Rob Bell founded the church aged 28, and served as Mars Hill's Teaching Pastor until 2011. On August 1, 2005, Zondervan Publishing released his first book, Velvet Elvis: Repainting the Christian Faith. His second book, Sex God, was released in 2007 through the same publishing company, and in 2008, former Lead Pastor Don Golden co-wrote a book with Bell titled "Jesus Wants to Save Christians: A Manifesto for the Church in Exile." Upon Golden's departure, Mars Hill shifted to a team leadership structure while retaining an executive pastor, currently Brian Mucci. In 2010 Shane Hipps joined Mars Hill, splitting time with Bell as teaching pastor. Hipps had previously pastored a small Mennonite Church in Arizona, Trinity Mennonite Church. Prior to his pastoral ministry, Hipps had worked in marketing and advertising for Porsche. In March 2011 Bell released a book titled Love Wins: A Book About Heaven, Hell And The Fate Of Every Person Who Ever Lived. The church announced on 9 September 2011 that Bell would be leaving the church in pursuit of new opportunities. On 18 December 2011, Bell delivered his final message as the head pastor of Mars Hill, saying farewell to the community in which he had a critical role in launching nearly 13 years prior.

Following Bell's departure, a national search was conducted and in August 2012, it was announced that Kent Dobson would take over the role as sole teaching pastor. Previously, Dobson had served as worship director during the early years of the church.

In November 2015, Dobson announced he was leaving Mars Hill telling the congregation "being a pastor at a church is not really who I am." Dobson was succeeded in August 2016 by AJ Sherrill, former pastor of Trinity Grace Church: Chelsea in NYC.

In August 2020, Sherrill announced his departure from Mars Hill. In summer of 2021, it was announced that Ashlee Eiland and former worship pastor Troy Hatfield would fill in Sherrill's role as co-lead pastors.

== Grand Village Mall ==
Mars Hill Bible Church occupies a building which was originally a shopping mall called Grand Village Mall. The mall, including a Witmark catalog showroom as an anchor store, closed in the late 1990s and was converted into the current home of Mars Hill.
