= Hudson's Bay Trading Company =

American portfolio company

Hudson's Bay Trading Company, L.P
- Type: Holding company
- Industry: Retail
- Founded: 2008
- Defunct: 2012
- Fate: dissolved
- Headquarters: New York, New York
- Area served: Canada and United States
- Key people: Robert C. Baker and Richard A. Baker
- Owner: NRDC Equity Partners
- Number of employees: 70,000

Hudson's Bay Trading Company, L.P. was an American portfolio company for NRDC Equity Partners, a private equity company. Hudson's Bay Trading Company was founded in 2008.

NRDC Equity Partners was founded by Robert Baker and Richard Baker of National Realty and Development Corp., and William Mack and Lee Neibart of AREA Property Partners. Richard Baker served as President CEO of NRDC Equity Partners.

On January 23, 2012, the Financial Post reported that Baker had dissolved Hudson's Bay Trading Co., and Toronto-based Hudson's Bay Company was now to operate both The Bay and Lord & Taylor. This new entity would be run by The Bay CEO Bonnie Brooks. CEO Brendan Hoffman would leave Lord & Taylor and take over as CEO at the department store chain Bon Ton. Baker would remain governor and CEO of the business and Donald Watros stay on as chief operating officer.

== Assets ==
Canada

- Hudson's Bay Company, a Canadian retail company consisting of:
  - The Bay, a high-end department store chain
  - Zellers, a mass-market department store
  - Home Outfitters, a home decor retailer
  - Fields, a variety store chain

United States

- Lord & Taylor, a high-end department store chain
- Fortunoff (2008-09), jewelry department store chain
