= Hudson's Bay Company =

Canadian retail business holding company (1670–2025)

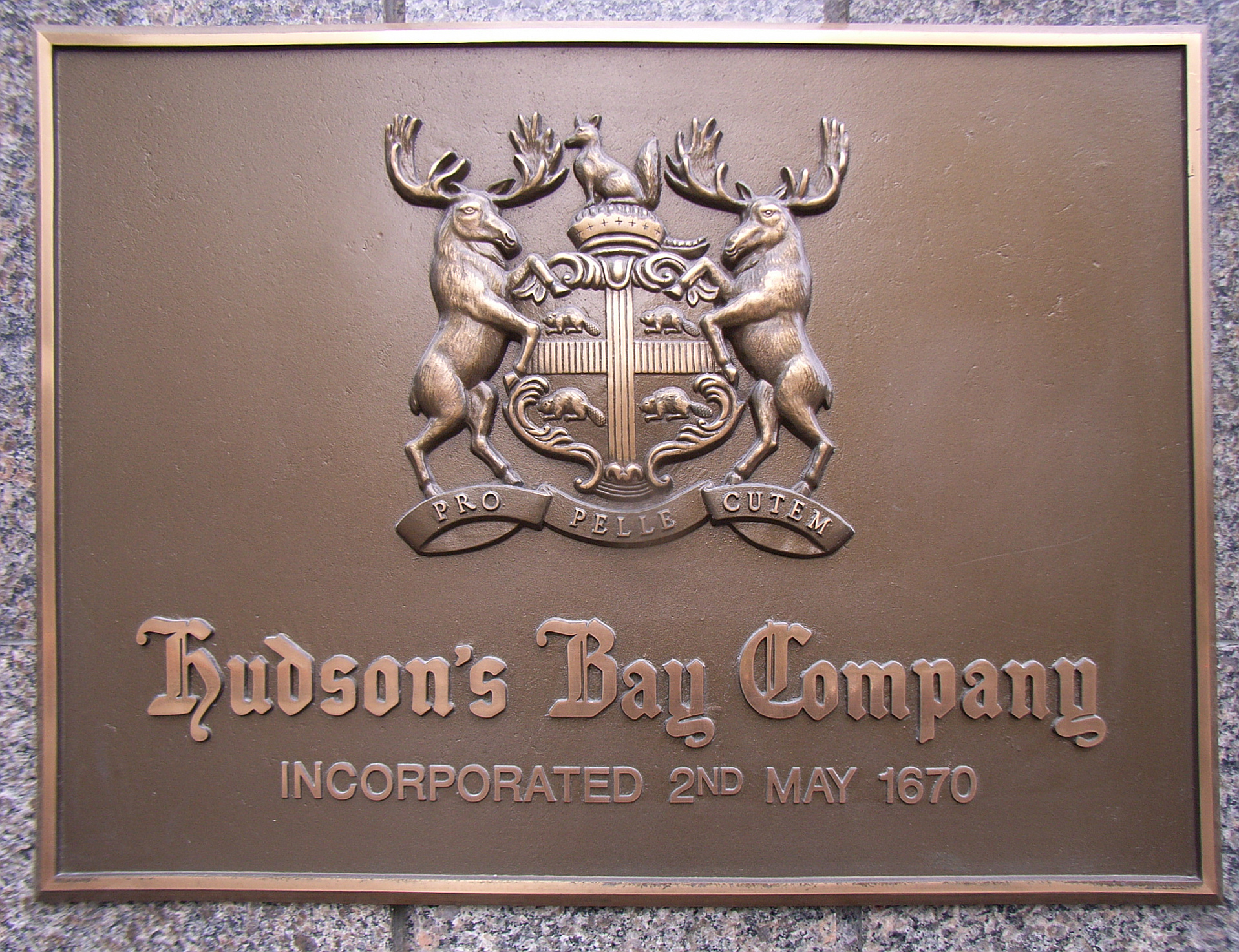
- Coat of arms plaque on the exterior of the former flagship store in Downtown Toronto (2007)
- Formerly: The Governor and Company of Adventurers of England Trading Into Hudson's Bay
- Type: Privately held
- Industry: Retail
- Genre: Department stores
- Founded: 2 May 1670; 356 years ago in London, England
- Founders: Médard des Groseilliers; Pierre-Esprit Radisson
- Defunct: 1 June 2025; 17 months ago
- Fate: Creditor protection and liquidation; remains an intellectual property and brand for point blankets and other merchandise
- Successor: Canadian Tire
- Headquarters: Toronto, Ontario, Canada
- Areas served: Canada
- Revenue: ▲CA$9.4 billion (2018)
- Net income: ▼CA$−631 million (2018)
- Number of employees: 9,364 (at liquidation, 2025)
- Parent: NRDC Equity Partners (2008–2025)
- Subsidiaries: Hudson's Bay (1881–2025) Previously defunct and/or divested: Saks Fifth Avenue (2013–2024); Saks Off 5th (2013–2024); Home Outfitters (1998–2019); Lord & Taylor (2012–2019); Galeria Kaufhof (2015–2018); Gilt (2015–2018); Zellers (1978–2013) (2023-2025) pop-up at select Hudson's Bay locations; Fields (1978–2012); Designer Depot (2004–2008); Kmart Canada (1998); Woodward's (1993); Simpsons (1978–1991); Towers (1990–1991); Shop-Rite (1972–1982); Morgan's (1960–1973); Freimans (1972–1973); I. G. Baker Company (1891)
- Website: Archived official website

The Hudson's Bay Company (Note: French: Compagnie de la Baie d'Hudson) (abbreviated HBC and colloquially Hudson's Bay or The Bay) was a Canadian holding company of department stores and commercial property. Founded in 1670 and liquidated in 2025, it was the oldest company in Canada and the second in North America after the Harvard Corporation (the managing corporation of Harvard University). It was headquartered at the Simpson Tower in Toronto. It is now an intellectual property and brand of Canadian Tire within its stores for its iconic point stripe blankets and other HBC merchandise.

The founding royal charter, issued by King Charles II, granted the company the right of "sole trade and commerce" over the Rupert's Land territory, the borders of which were based on the Hudson Bay drainage basin covering most of central Canada and smaller parts of the northern United States. HBC controlled the fur trade throughout English and later British North America, and was its de facto government until it relinquished control of the land to Canada in 1869. The company then diversified with the ownership and operation of several retail businesses throughout Canada. The company established its namesake department stores in 1881, the Home Outfitters home furnishings stores in 1999, and acquired the Zellers and Fields discount stores in 1978. It also owned several regional department stores that were eventually converted to The Bay, including Morgan's, Simpsons, and Woodward's. Expansions beyond Canada included the United States, where it owned department stores including Lord & Taylor, Saks Fifth Avenue, and Saks Off 5th in the 2010s; and the Netherlands, where it sold its remaining stores in 2019.

The Thomson family was the majority stockholder of HBC from 1979 to 1992 and sold its last shares in the company in 1997. HBC was bought by American businessman Jerry Zucker in 2006 and became privately held. Following Zucker's death in April 2008, HBC was acquired by NRDC Equity Partners and was operated by the latter's holding company Hudson's Bay Trading Company until 2012. HBC went public again from 2012 to 2020 on the Toronto Stock Exchange, with NRDC as the main shareholder.

HBC spun-off its American assets into the holding company Saks Global in November 2024, and filed for creditor protection in March 2025. By this time, its business consisted only of Hudson's Bay stores and the Canadian locations of Saks. Following the closure of its remaining stores by June 2025 and the subsequent sale of its intellectual property to Canadian Tire, the Hudson's Bay Company was formally renamed 1242939 B.C. Unlimited Liability Co. in August 2025. By December 2025, the liquidation of the company was essentially complete, with the royal charter and art collection having been auctioned off, and its former store leases either sold to other parties or returned to landlords. As of February 2026, eight people were still working at the company, compared to 9,364 when it filed for creditor protection and closed its stores in 2025, and a high of 70,000 employees in 2006.

== 17th-century history ==
Rupert's Land, an area that encompasses the drainage basin of the Hudson Bay

For much of the 17th century, the French colonists in North America, based in New France, operated a de facto monopoly in the North American fur trade. Two French traders, Pierre-Esprit Radisson and Médard des Groseilliers (Médard de Chouart, Sieur des Groseilliers), Radisson's brother-in-law, learned from the Cree that the best fur country lay north and west of Lake Superior, and that there was a "frozen sea" still further north. Assuming this was Hudson Bay, they sought French backing for a plan to set up a trading post on the Bay in order to reduce the cost of moving furs overland. According to Peter C. Newman, "concerned that exploration of the Hudson Bay route might shift the focus of the fur trade away from the St. Lawrence River, the French governor", Marquis d'Argenson (in office 1658–61), "refused to grant the coureurs des bois permission to scout the distant territory". Despite this refusal, in 1659 Radisson and Groseilliers set out for the upper Great Lakes basin. A year later they returned to Montreal with premium furs, evidence of the potential of the Hudson Bay region. Subsequently, they were arrested by French authorities for trading without a licence and fined, and their furs were confiscated by the government.

Determined to establish trade in the Hudson Bay area, Radisson and Groseilliers approached a group of English colonial merchants in Boston to help finance their explorations. The Bostonians agreed on the plan's merits, but their speculative voyage in 1663 failed when their ship ran into pack ice in the Hudson Strait. Boston-based English commissioner Colonel George Cartwright learned of the expedition and brought the two to England to raise financing. Radisson and Groseilliers arrived in London in 1665 at the height of the Great Plague. Eventually, the two met and gained the sponsorship of Prince Rupert. Prince Rupert introduced the two to his cousin, the reigning king – Charles II. In 1668 the English expedition acquired two ships, the Nonsuch and the Eaglet, to explore possible trade into Hudson Bay. Groseilliers sailed on the Nonsuch, commanded by Captain Zachariah Gillam, while the Eaglet was commanded by Captain William Stannard and accompanied by Radisson. On 5 June 1668, both ships left port at Deptford, England, but the Eaglet was forced to turn back off the coast of Ireland.

The Nonsuch continued to James Bay, the southern portion of Hudson Bay, where its explorers founded, in 1668, the first fort on Hudson Bay, Charles Fort at the mouth of the Rupert River. It later became known as "Rupert House", and developed as the community of present-day Waskaganish, Quebec. Both the fort and the river were named after the sponsor of the expedition, Prince Rupert of the Rhine, one of the major investors and soon to become the new company's first governor. After a successful trading expedition over the winter of 1668–69, Nonsuch returned to England on 9 October 1669 with the first cargo of fur resulting from trade in Hudson Bay. The bulk of the fur – worth £1,233 – was sold to Thomas Glover, one of London's most prominent furriers. This and subsequent purchases by Glover proved the viability of the fur trade in Hudson Bay.

Hudson's Bay Company Act 1689
- Act of Parliament
- Parliament of England
- Long title: An Act for confirming to the Governor and Company trading to Hudson's Bay, their Privileges and Trade.
- Citation: 2 Will. & Mar. c. 15 Pr.
- Territorial extent: England and Wales

Dates
- Royal assent: 20 May 1690
- Commencement: 20 March 1690 (Note: Start of session.)

Status: Current legislation

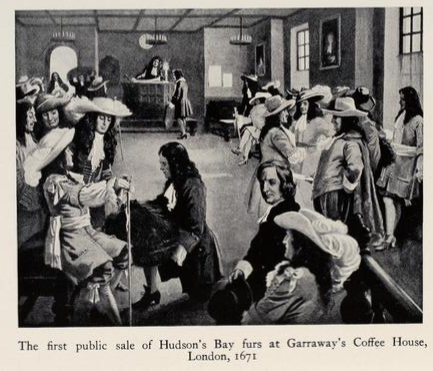
Depiction of the first sale of Hudson's Bay fur at Garraway's Coffee House in London, 1671

A royal charter from King Charles II incorporated "The Governor and Company of Adventurers of England, trading into Hudson's Bay" on 2 May 1670. The charter granted the company a monopoly over the region drained by all rivers and streams flowing into Hudson Bay in northern parts of present-day Canada, taking part on behalf of England. The area was named "Rupert's Land" after Prince Rupert, the first governor of the company appointed by the King. This drainage basin of Hudson Bay spans 3,861,400 square kilometres (1,490,900 sq mi), comprising over one-third of the area of modern-day Canada, and stretches into the present-day north-central United States. The specific boundaries remained unknown at the time. Rupert's Land would eventually become Canada's largest land "purchase" in the 19th century.

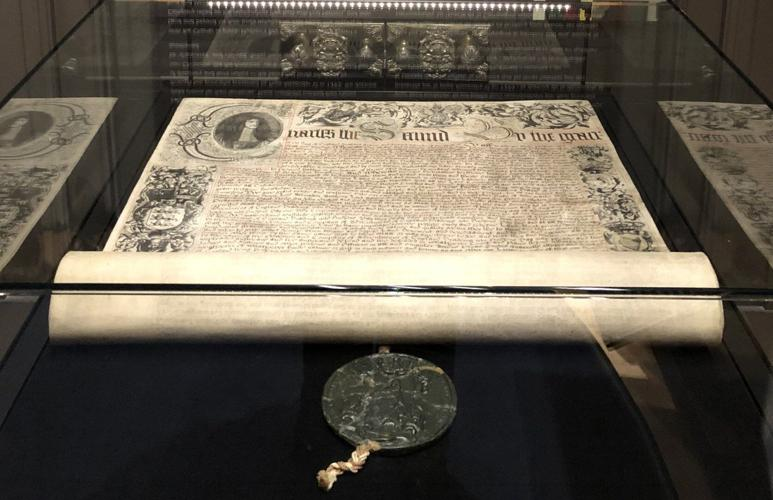
Charter of the HBC

The HBC established six posts between 1668 and 1717. Rupert House (1668, southeast), Moose Factory (1673, south) and Fort Albany, Ontario (1679, west) were erected on James Bay; three other posts were established on the western shore of Hudson Bay proper: New Severn (1685), York Factory (1684), and Fort Churchill (1717). Inland posts were not built until 1774. After 1774, York Factory became the main post because of its convenient access to the vast interior waterway-systems of the Saskatchewan and Red rivers. Originally called "factories" because the "factor", i.e., a person acting as a mercantile agent, did business from there, these posts operated in the manner of the Dutch fur-trading operations in New Netherland. By adoption of the Standard of Trade in the 18th century, the HBC ensured consistent pricing throughout Rupert's Land. A means of exchange arose based on the "Made Beaver" (MB); a prime pelt, worn for a year and ready for processing: "the prices of all trade goods were set in values of Made Beaver (MB) with other animal pelts, such as squirrel, otter and moose quoted in their MB (made beaver) equivalents. For example, two otter pelts might equal 1 MB".

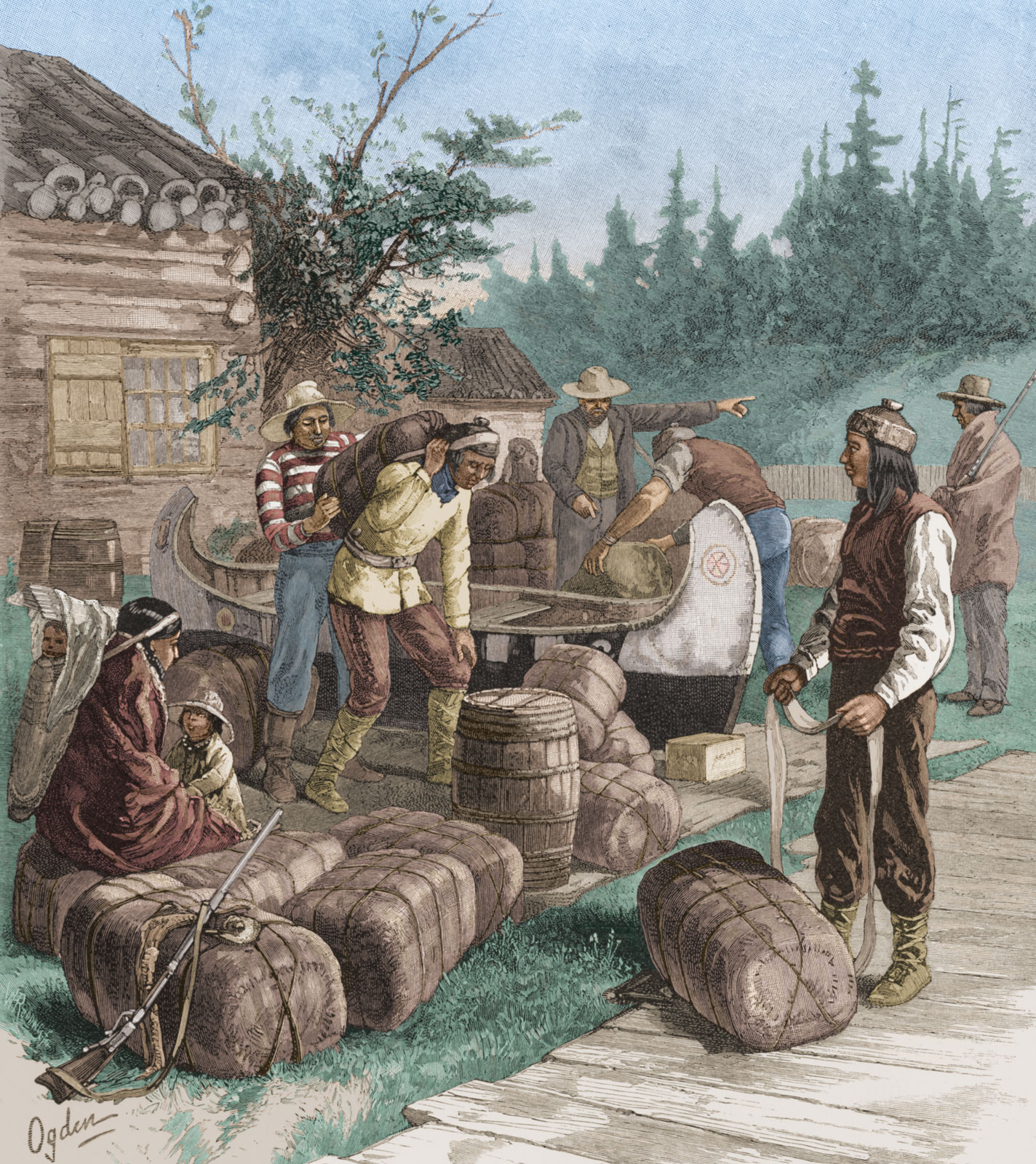
Trading at an HBC trading post

During the fall and winter, First Nations men and European fur trappers accomplished the vast majority of the animal trapping and pelt preparation. They travelled by canoe and on foot to the forts to sell their pelts. In exchange they typically received popular trade-goods such as knives, kettles, beads, needles, and the Hudson's Bay point blanket. The arrival of the First Nations trappers was one of the high points of the year, met with pomp and circumstance. The highlight was very formal, an almost ritualized "trading ceremony" between the chief trader and the captain of the Indigenous contingent who traded on their behalf. During the initial years of the fur trade, prices for items varied from post to post.

In addition to fur, Indigenous people were also traded to the company as slaves. The York Factory General Account Book for 1688-9, one of the oldest records of HBC activity, lists a transaction of "one short English Gun given for a slave man, One Long[ English] Gun given for a woman." Indigenous slaves were usually women or young boys, stolen by war parties and then sold to traders. They were kept as guides, translators, and labourers by company employees, or otherwise married to workers, part of the practice of intermarriage known as Marriage à la façon du pays ("according to the custom of the country"). Records of Indigenous enslavement extend from the beginning of the HBC's presence in North America through the early 19th century.^{:86-89}

The early coastal factory model of the English contrasted with the system of the French, who established an extensive system of inland posts at native villages and sent traders to live among the tribes of the region, learning their languages and often forming alliances through marriages with Indigenous women. In March 1686 the French sent a raiding party under the Chevalier de Troyes more than 1,300 km (810 mi) to capture the HBC posts along James Bay. The French appointed Pierre Le Moyne d'Iberville, who had shown great heroism during the raids, as commander of the company's captured posts. In 1687 an English attempt to resettle Fort Albany failed due to strategic deceptions by d'Iberville. After 1688 England and France were officially at war, and the conflict played out in North America as well. D'Iberville raided Fort Severn in 1690 but did not attempt to raid the well-defended local headquarters at York Factory. In 1693 the HBC recovered Fort Albany; d'Iberville captured York Factory in 1694, but the company recovered it the next year.

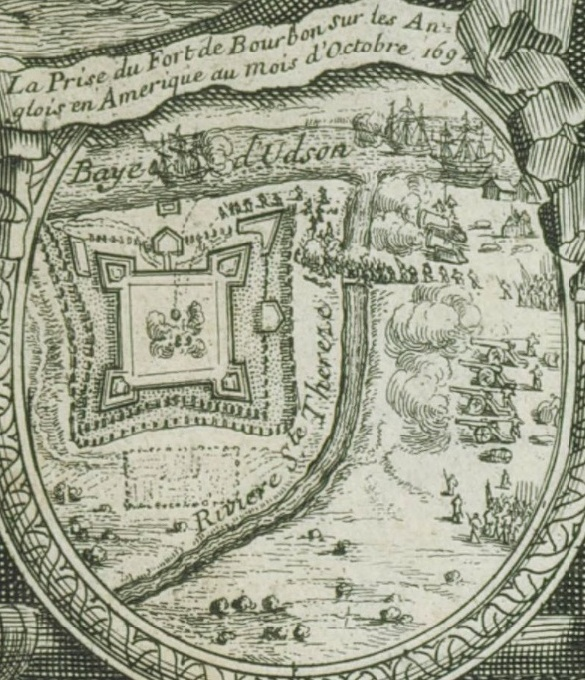
Depiction of the capture of York Factory by French forces in 1694

In 1697, d'Iberville again commanded a French naval raid on York Factory. On the way to the fort he defeated three ships of the Royal Navy in the Battle of Hudson's Bay (5 September 1697), the largest naval battle in the history of the North American Arctic. D'Iberville's depleted French force captured York Factory by laying siege to the fort and pretending to be a much larger army. The French retained all of the outposts except Fort Albany until 1713. A small French and Indian force attacked Fort Albany again in 1709 during Queen Anne's War but was unsuccessful. The economic consequences of the French possession of these posts for the company were significant; the HBC did not pay any dividends for more than 20 years. See Anglo-French conflicts on Hudson Bay.

== 18th-century history ==
With the ending of the Nine Years' War in 1697, and the War of the Spanish Succession in 1713 with the signing of the Treaty of Utrecht, France had made substantial concessions. Among the treaty's many provisions, it required France to relinquish all claims to Great Britain on the Hudson Bay, which again became a British possession. (The Kingdom of Great Britain had been established following the union of Scotland and England in 1707).

After the treaty, the HBC built Prince of Wales Fort, a stone star fort at the mouth of the nearby Churchill River. In 1782, during the American Revolutionary War, a French squadron under Jean-François de Galaup, comte de Lapérouse captured and demolished York Factory and Prince of Wales Fort in support of the American rebels.

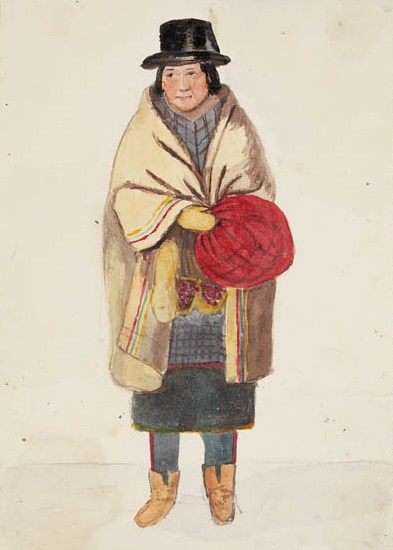
Depiction of an Indigenous woman wearing a Hudson's Bay point blanket, c. 1850

In its trade with Indigenous peoples, Hudson's Bay Company exchanged wool blankets, called Hudson's Bay point blankets, for the beaver pelts trapped by Indigenous hunters. By 1700, point blankets accounted for more than 60 percent of the trade. The number of indigo stripes (a.k.a. points) woven into the blankets identified its finished size. A long-held misconception is that the number of stripes was related to its value in beaver pelts.

A parallel may be drawn between the HBC's control over Rupert's Land with the trade monopoly and government functions enjoyed by the East India Company over India during roughly the same period. The HBC invested £10,000 in the East India Company in 1732, which it viewed as a major competitor.

Hudson's Bay Company's first inland trading post was established by Samuel Hearne in 1774 with Cumberland House, Saskatchewan.

Conversely, a number of inland HBC "houses" pre-date the construction of Cumberland House, in 1774. Henley House, (HH) established in 1743, inland from Hudson Bay, at the confluence of the Albany and Kenogami Rivers, a prime strategic location between Upland and Lowland Indigenous peoples, as well as the rival English and French traders. HH was dependent on Albany River – Fort Albany for lines of communication. Henley House was sacked in 1754, and its servants killed. Three of the five attackers (rebels?) were apprehended at Albany Fort and hanged on June 21, 1755. HH was raised a few years later, then rebuilt in 1759, only to be sacked again immediately. Next, the inland houses of Split Lake and Nelson Houses were established between 1740 and 1760. These were dependent on York River – York Factory and Churchill River, respectively. Although not inland, Richmond Fort was established in 1749. This was on an island within Hudson Bay. It was titled a "New Discovery" in 1749, and by 1750 was titled Richmond Gulf. The name was changed to Richmond Fort and given the abbreviation RF from 1756 to 1759, it served mainly as a trade goods and provisions storage location. Additional inland posts were Capusco River and Chickney Creek, both circa 1750. Likewise, Brunswick (1776), New Brunswick (1777), Gloucester (1777), Upper Hudson (ca. 1778), Lower Hudson (1779), Rupert, and Wapiscogami Houses were established in the 1770s. These post-date Cumberland House, yet speak to the expanding inland incursion of the HBC in the last quarter of the 18th century. Minor posts also during this time period include Mesackamy/Mesagami Lake (1777), Sturgeon Lake (1778), and Beaver Lake Posts.

On their way to Canada from London, the Company's ships would call in at Stromness in Orkney to take on water and supplies. For most of the Eighteenth Century Orkney became the Company's principal recruiting ground.

In 1779, other traders founded the North West Company (NWC) in Montreal as a seasonal partnership to provide more capital and to continue competing with the HBC. It became operative for the outfit of 1780 and was the first joint-stock company in Canada and possibly North America. The agreement lasted one year. A second agreement established in 1780 had a three-year term. The company became a permanent entity in 1783. By 1784, the NWC had begun to make serious inroads into the HBC's profits.

== 19th-century history ==
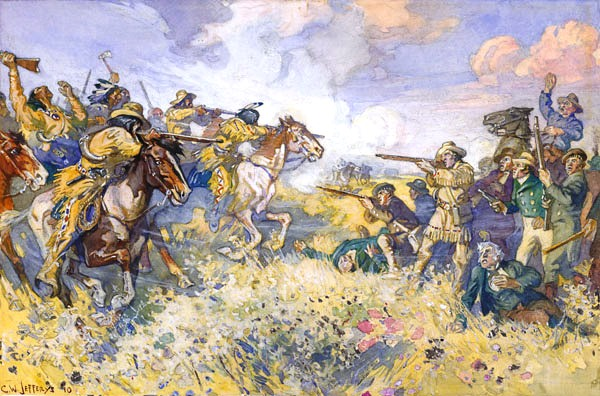
Depiction of the Battle of Seven Oaks, a violent confrontation between HBC and the North West Company during the Pemmican War

The North West Company (NWC) was the main rival in the fur trade. The competition led to the small Pemmican War in 1816, which culminated in the Battle of Seven Oaks on 19 June 1816. In 1821, the NWC and Hudson's Bay Company were forcibly merged by intervention of the British government to put an end to the violent competition. Of the 175 posts, 68 of them the HBC's, were reduced to 52 for efficiency and because many were redundant as a result of the rivalry and were inherently unprofitable. Their combined territory was extended by a licence to the North-Western Territory, which reached to the Arctic Ocean in the north and, with the creation of the Columbia Department in the Pacific Northwest, to the Pacific Ocean in the west. The NWC's regional headquarters at Fort George (Fort Astoria) was relocated to Fort Vancouver by 1825, making it the HBC's base of operations on the Pacific Slope.

Before the merger, the employees of the HBC, unlike those of the NWC, did not participate in its profits. After the merger, with all operations under the management of Sir George Simpson (1826–60), the company had a corps of commissioned officers: 25 chief factors and 28 chief traders, who shared in the company's profits during the monopoly years. Its trade covered 7,770,000 km^{2} (3,000,000 sq mi), and it had 1,500 contract employees.

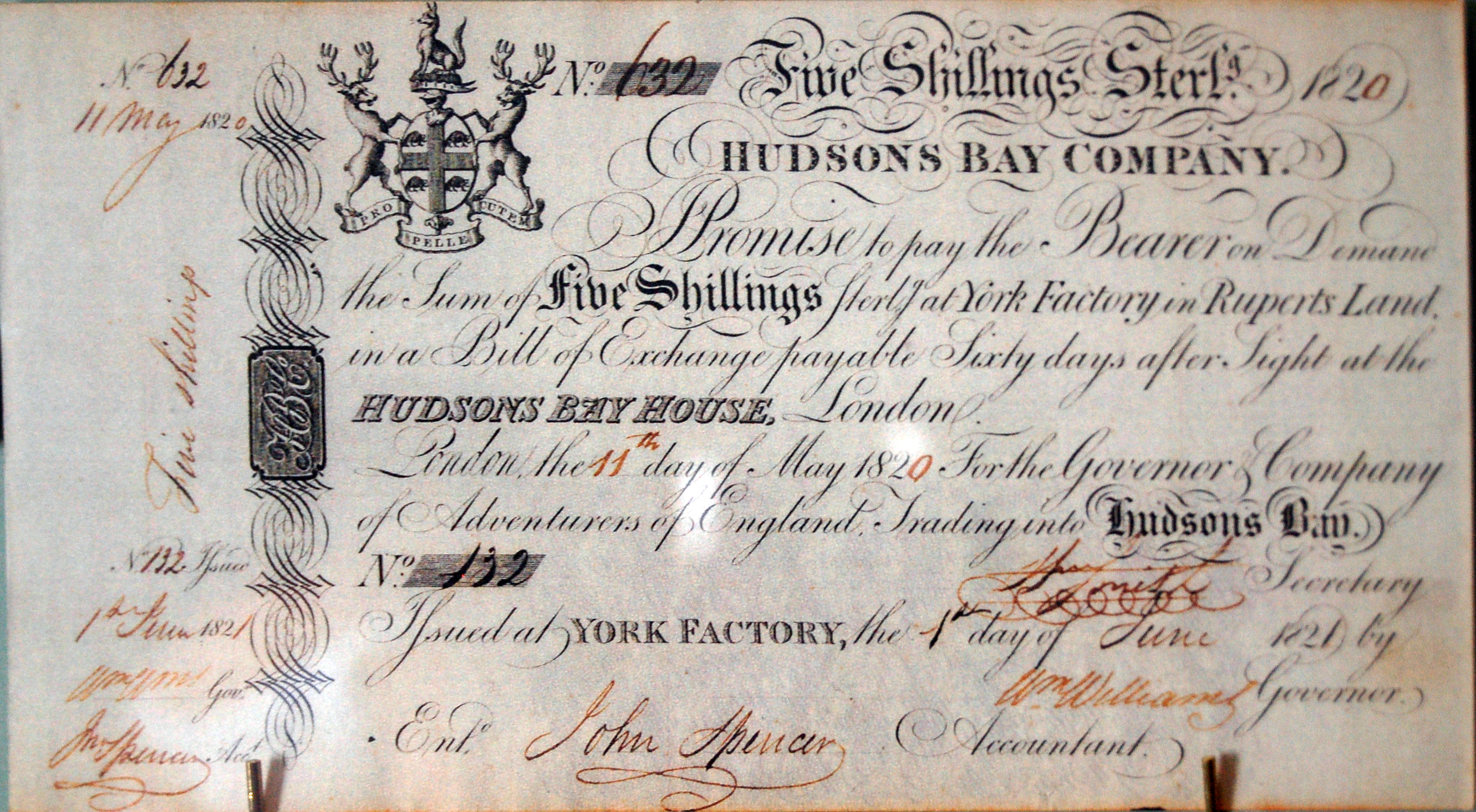
Currency issued by the Hudson's Bay Company, 1820

Between 1820 and 1870, the HBC issued its own paper money. The notes, denominated in sterling, were printed in London and issued at York Factory for circulation primarily in the Red River Colony.

=== Competition and exploration ===
Although the HBC maintained a monopoly on the fur trade during the early to mid-19th century, there was competition from James Sinclair and Andrew McDermot (Dermott), independent traders in the Red River Colony. They shipped furs by the Red River Trails to Norman Kittson, a buyer in the United States. In addition, Americans controlled the maritime fur trade on the Northwest Coast until the 1830s.

Throughout the 1820s and the 1830s, the HBC controlled nearly all trading operations in the Pacific Northwest region and was based at its headquarters at Fort Vancouver, on the Columbia River. Although claims to the region were by agreement in abeyance, commercial operating rights were nominally shared by the United States and Britain through the Anglo-American Convention of 1818, but company policy, enforced via Chief Factor John McLoughlin of the company's Columbia District, was to discourage US settlement of the territory. The company's effective monopoly on trade virtually forbade any settlement in the region.

=== Additional early presence in present-day United States ===
Over and above the NWC Fort George headquarters site, the HBC carried on the early presence in the region of the NWC when it merged in 1821 with noteworthy sites: Spokane House, Fort Okanogan and Fort Nez Percés. Fort Colville located further North on the Columbia River replaced Spokane House in 1825.

In the mid-1820s, Peter Skene Ogden and a brigade of over 100 men pushed south to trap in the area that is now the state of Utah. As one of the notable early European explorers in the region, several locations in northern Utah now bear Ogden's name, including the city of Ogden, the Ogden Valley and the Ogden River.

Fort Umpqua was established in 1832 in present-day southern Oregon after the Willamette River had been explored up toward its headwaters by mainly the NWC. Nisqually House was built during the same year to establish a presence further North on Puget Sound in present-day State of Washington, resulting in Fort Nisqually a few years later closer to present-day Canadian sites.

The HBC established Fort Boise in 1834 (in present-day southwestern Idaho) to compete with the American Fort Hall, 483 km (300 mi) to the east. In 1837, it purchased Fort Hall, also along the route of the Oregon Trail. The outpost director displayed the abandoned wagons of discouraged settlers to those seeking to move west along the trail.

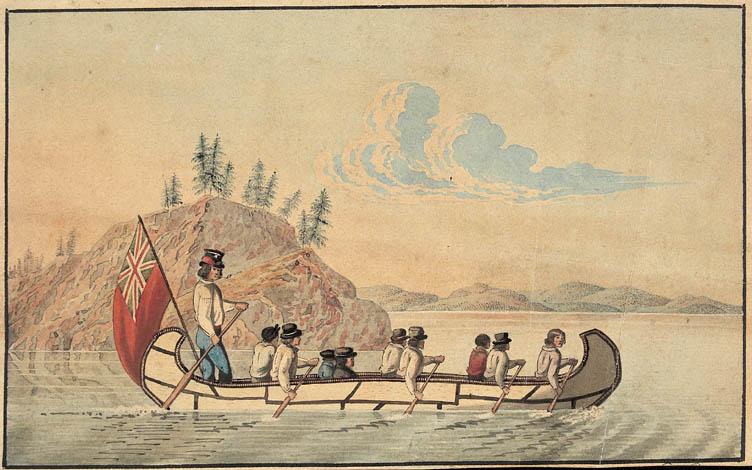
HBC officials in an express canoe crossing a lake, 1825

HBC trappers were also deeply involved in the early exploration and development of Northern California. Company trapping brigades were sent south from Fort Vancouver, along what became known as the Siskiyou Trail, into Northern California as far south as the San Francisco Bay Area, where the company operated a trading post at Yerba Buena (San Francisco). The southern-most camp of the company was French Camp, east of San Francisco in the Central Valley adjacent to the future site of the city of Stockton. These trapping brigades in Northern California faced serious risks, and were often the first to explore relatively uncharted territory. They included the lesser known Peter Skene Ogden and Samuel Black.

The HBC also operated a store in what were then known as the Sandwich Islands (now the Hawaiian Islands), engaging in merchant shipping to the island kingdom between 1828 and 1859. Hawaiians themselves were recruited as part of the HBC workforce as navigators and often settled anywhere it harboured in the Northwest and intermarrying with the local populations from present day British Columbia all the way south to Washington especially Fort Vancouver.

Extending the presence it had built in present-day British Columbia northern coast, the HBC reached by 1838 as far North as Fort Stikine in the Alaska Panhandle by present-day Wrangell. The RAC-HBC agreement (1839) with the Russian American Company (RAC) provided for such a continuing presence in exchange for the HBC to supply the Russian coastal sites with agricultural products. The Puget Sound Agricultural Company subsidiary was created to supply grain, dairy, livestock and manufactured goods out of Fort Vancouver, Fort Nisqually, Fort Cowlitz and Fort Langley in present-day southern British Columbia.

The company's stranglehold on the region was broken by the first successful large wagon train to reach Oregon in 1843, led by Marcus Whitman. In the years that followed, thousands of emigrants poured into the Willamette Valley of Oregon. In 1846, the United States acquired full authority south of the 49th parallel; the most settled areas of the Oregon Country were south of the Columbia River in what is now Oregon. McLoughlin, who had once turned away would-be settlers when he was company director, then welcomed them from his general store at Oregon City. He later became known as the "Father of Oregon".

=== Early presence in present-day Canada (British Columbia) ===
The HBC also carried on the early presence in the region of the NWC in present-day central and northern British Columbia with noteworthy sites: Fort Alexandria, Fort d'Épinette (Fort St. John), Fort St. James, Fort George and Fort Shuswap (Fort Kamloops).

Since the 1818 Treaty settled the 49th parallel border only as far as the Rocky Mountains, the HBC was looking for a site further West in case the parallel border would become further extended at the end of the 10 years joint occupancy term. By 1824, the HBC was commissioning an expedition to travel from the Fort George regional headquarter on the southern shore of the Columbia River all the way to the Fraser River. The three boats 40 some crew led by the James McMillan were first to officially ever make it to Puget Sound from the continent, to reach its northern end into Boundary Bay and to bypass the mouth of the Fraser. They shortcut through two mainland rivers and a portage in order to finally reach the lower Fraser. Friendly tribes were identified along with subsistence farming land suitable for sustaining a trading post. The first Fort Langley was subsequently built (1827), establishing an early settlers long lasting presence in current day southern British Columbia. The fur trade in a wet climate turned out to be marginal and quickly evolved into a salmon trade site with abundant supply in the vicinity.

The HBC stretched its presence North on the coastline with Fort Simpson (1831) on the Nass River, Fort McLoughlin (1833) and the Beaver (1836), the first steamship to ever roam the Pacific Northwest for resupplying its coastline sites. The HBC was securing a trading monopoly on the coastline keeping away independent American traders: "By 1837, American competition on the North West Coast was effectively over".

The HBC gained more control of the fur trade with both the coastline and inland tribes to access the fur rich New Caledonia district in current day northern British Columbia: "monopoly control of the coastal fur trade allowed the HBC to impose a uniform tariff on both sides of the Coast Mountains".

By 1843, under pressure from the Americans to withdraw further North with the looming Oregon Treaty border negotiation finalized in 1846, and strong of its coastal presence on the northern coast, HBC built Fort Victoria at the southern end of present-day Vancouver Island in southern BC. A well sheltered ocean port with agricultural potential in the vicinity would allow the new regional headquarter to further develop the trade on salmon, timber and cranberries. Trade via the Hawaiian post was also increasing. The Fort Rupert (1849) at the northern end of the island would open up access to coal fields. On the continent mainland, Fort Hope and Fort Yale (1848) were built to extend the HBC presence on the Fraser River as far as navigable. Brigades would link a rebuilt Fort Langley (1840) on the Lower Fraser to Fort Kamloops by 1850 and the rest of the transportation network to York Factory on the Hudson Bay along with the New Caledonia district fur returns.

=== End of monopoly ===
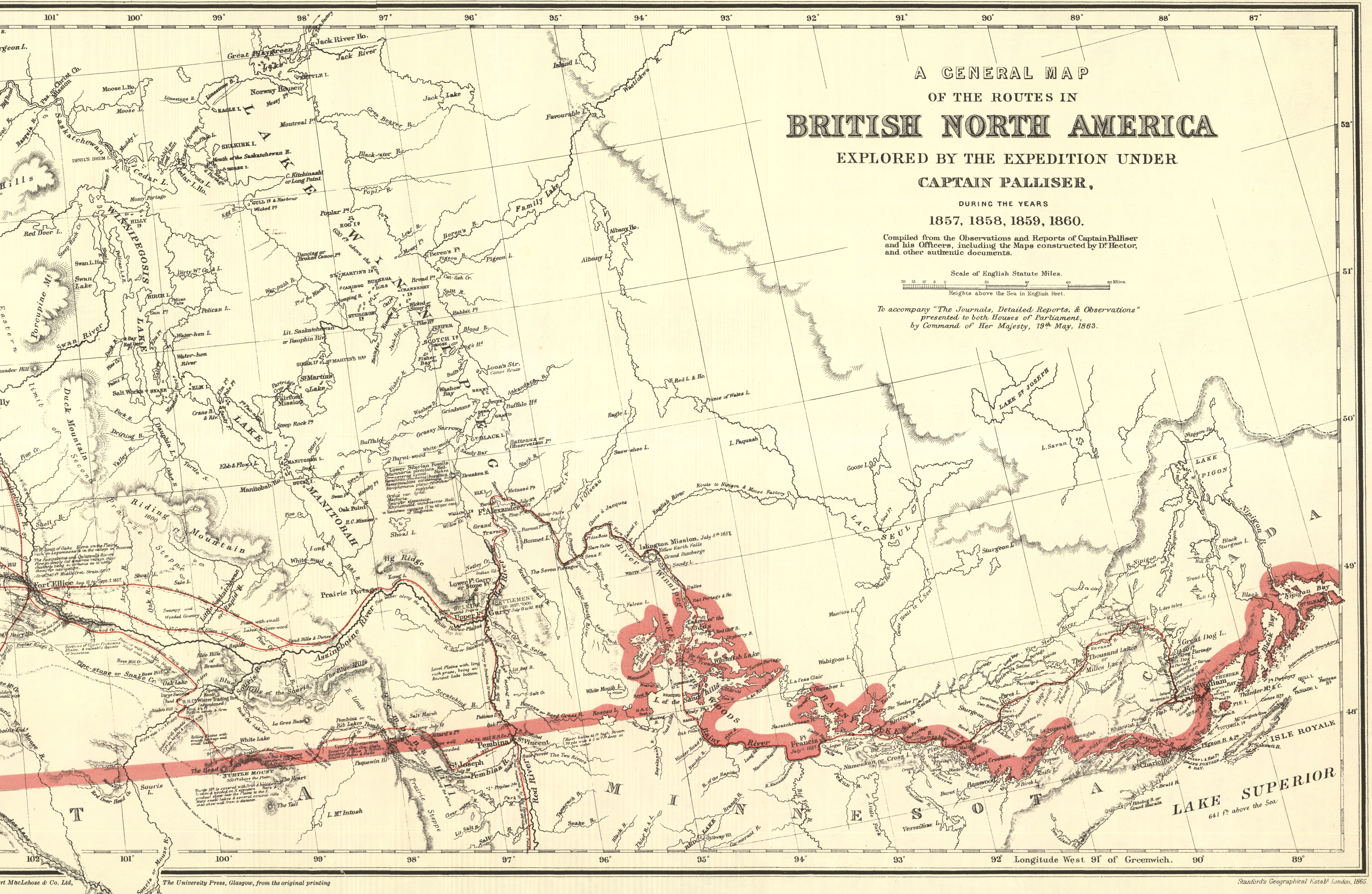
A section of a map showing the routes explored during the Palliser expedition

The Guillaume Sayer trial in 1849 contributed to the end of the HBC monopoly. Guillaume Sayer, a Métis trapper and trader, was accused of illegal trading in furs. The Court of Assiniboia brought Sayer to trial, before a jury of HBC officials and supporters. During the trial, a crowd of armed Métis men led by Louis Riel Sr. gathered outside the courtroom. Although Sayer was found guilty of illegal trade, having evaded the HBC monopoly, Judge Adam Thom did not levy a fine or punishment. Some accounts attributed that to the intimidating armed crowd gathered outside the courthouse. With the cry, "Le commerce est libre ! Le commerce est libre !" ("Trade is free! Trade is free!"), the Métis loosened the HBC's previous control of the courts, which had enforced their monopoly on the settlers of Red River.

Another factor was the findings of the Palliser Expedition of 1857 to 1860, led by Captain John Palliser. He surveyed the area of the prairies and wilderness from Lake Superior to the southern passes of the Rocky Mountains. Although he recommended against settlement of the region, the report sparked a debate. It fuelled the ongoing debate over the region's agricultural potential, challenging the position of the Hudson's Bay Company, which had long disputed that the Canadian West was capable of agricultural settlement.

In 1863, the International Financial Society bought controlling interest in the HBC, signalling a shift in the company's outlook: most of the new shareholders were less interested in the fur trade than in real estate speculation and economic development in the West. The Society floated £2 million in public shares on non-ceded land held ostensibly by the Hudson's Bay Company as an asset and leveraged this asset for collateral for these funds. These funds allowed the Society the financial means to weather the financial collapse of 1866, which destroyed many competitors, and invest in railways in North America.

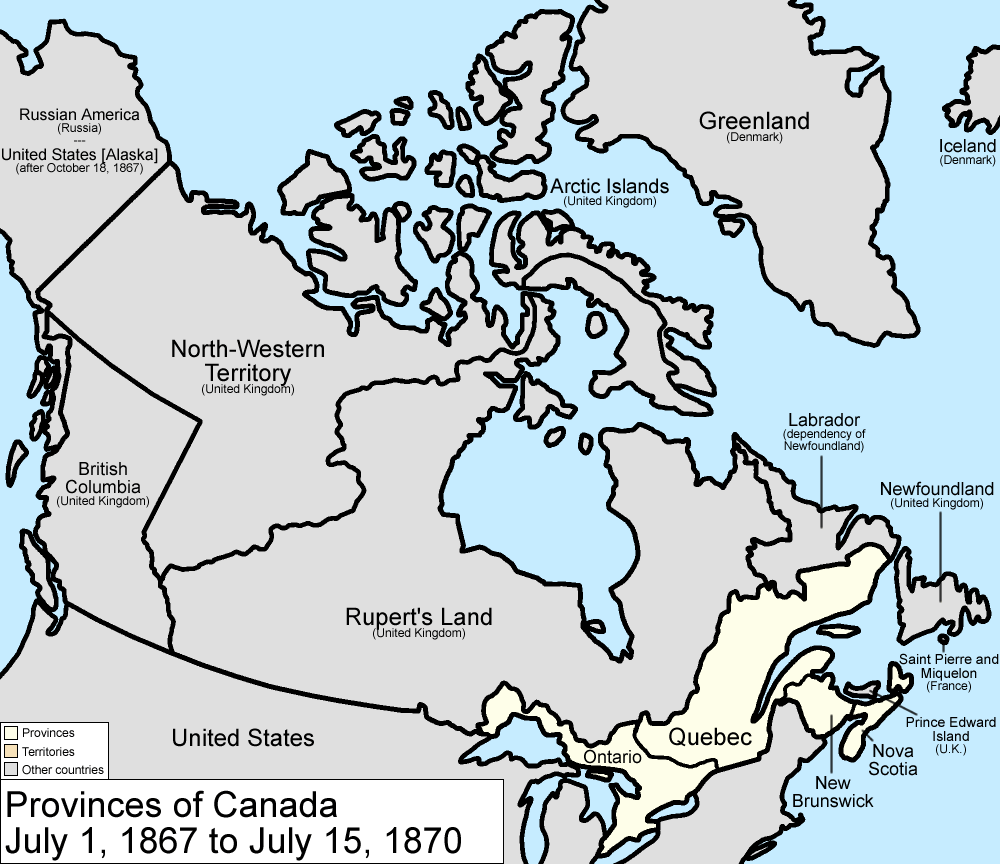
Map of British North America in 1870, prior to HBC ceding Rupert's Land and the North-Western Territory to Canada

In 1869, after rejecting the American government offer of CA$10 million, the company approved the return of Rupert's Land to Britain. The government gave it to Canada and loaned the new country the £300,000 required to compensate HBC for its losses. HBC also received one-twentieth of the fertile areas to be opened for settlement and retained title to the lands on which it had built trading establishments. The deal, known as the Deed of Surrender, came into force the following year. The resulting territory, the North-West Territories, was brought under Canadian jurisdiction under the terms of the Rupert's Land Act 1868, enacted by the Parliament of the United Kingdom. The Deed enabled the admission of the fifth province, Manitoba, to the Confederation on 15 July 1870, the same day that the deed itself came into force.

During the 19th century the Hudson's Bay Company went through great changes in response to such factors as growth of population and new settlements in part of its territory, and ongoing pressure from Britain. It seemed unlikely that it would continue to control the future of the West.

=== Shift to department stores ===
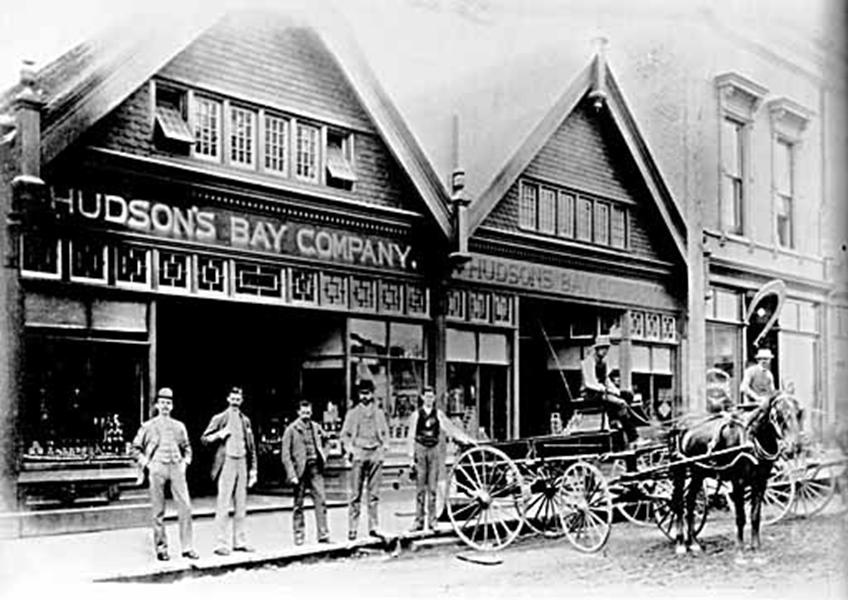
An HBC store in Vancouver, c. 1890s

The modern department store evolved from trading posts at the start of the 19th century, when they began to see demand for general merchandise grow rapidly. HBC soon expanded into the interior and set-up posts along river settlements that later developed into the modern cities of Winnipeg, Calgary and Edmonton. In 1857, the first sales shop was established in Fort Langley. This was followed by other sales shops in Fort Victoria (1859), Winnipeg (1881), Calgary (1884), Vancouver (1887), Vernon (1887), Edmonton (1890), Yorkton (1898), and Nelson (1902). The first of the grand "original six" department stores was built in Calgary in 1913. The other department stores that followed were in Edmonton, Vancouver, Victoria, Saskatoon, and Winnipeg.

== 20th-century history ==
The First World War interrupted a major remodelling and restoration of retail trade shops planned in 1912. Following the war, the company revitalized its fur trade and real estate activities, and diversified its operations by venturing into the oil business. During the Russian Civil War, the company briefly operated in the Siberian far east, even obtaining an agreement with the Soviet government until departing in 1924. The company co-founded Hudson's Bay Oil and Gas Company (HBOG) in 1926 with Marland Oil Company (which merged with Conoco in 1929). Although the company diversified into a number of areas, its department store business is the only remaining part of the company's operations, in the form of department stores under the Hudson's Bay brand. The company also established new trading posts in the Canadian Arctic.

=== Indigenous health ===
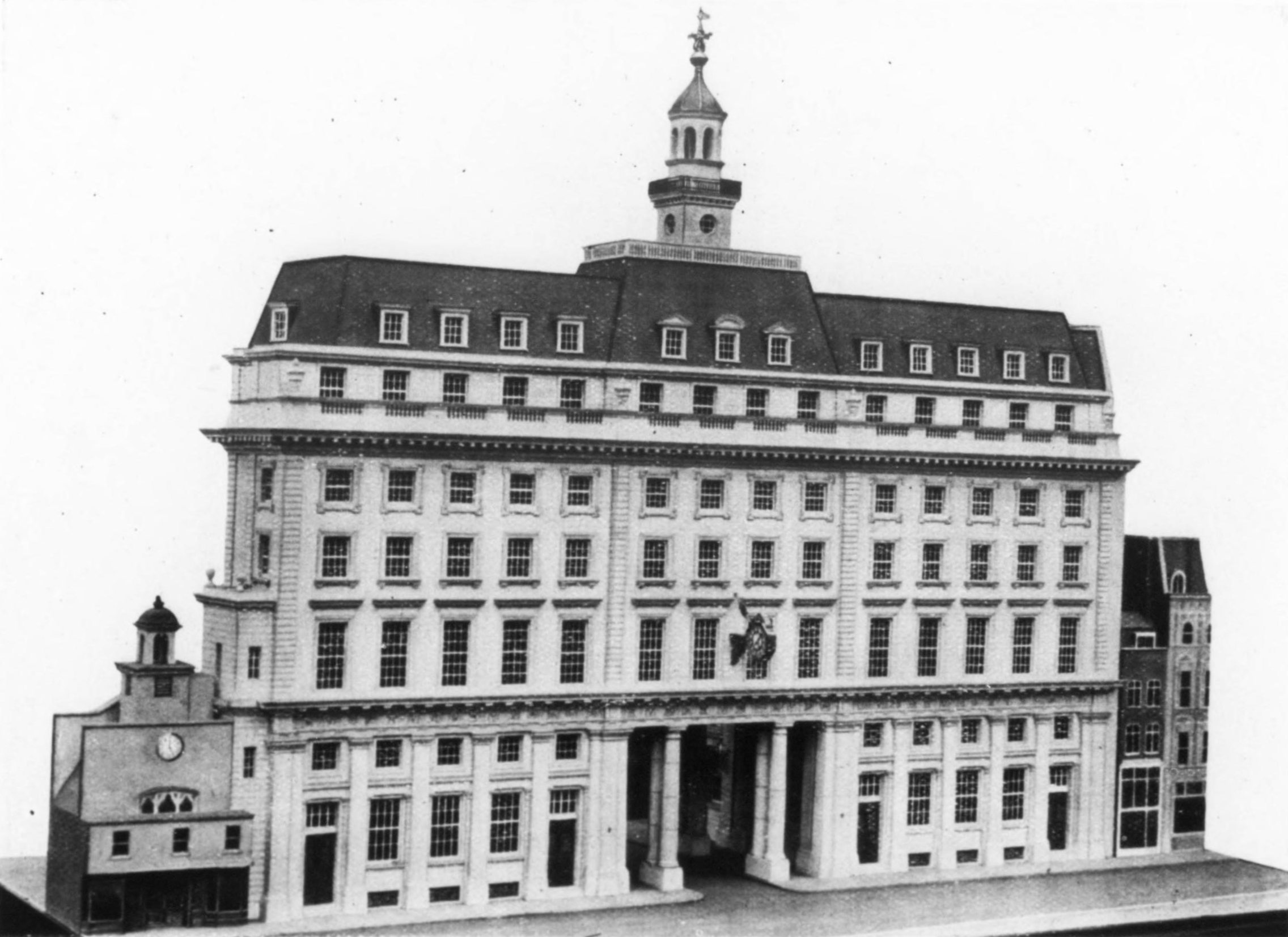
Model of Hudson's Bay House at 52-68 Bishopsgate in London, designed in 1926 by Mewès & Davis. The building served as the company's headquarters until November 1940.

The medical scientist Frederick Banting was travelling in the Arctic in 1927 when he realized that crew or passengers on board the HBC paddle wheeler Distributor were responsible for spreading the influenza virus down the Slave River and Mackenzie River. Less than a decade after the 1918 global flu pandemic, a similar virus spread territory-wide over the summer and autumn, devastating the Indigenous population of the north. Returning from the trip, Banting gave an interview in Montreal with a Toronto Star reporter under the agreement that his statements on HBC would remain off the record. The newspaper nonetheless published the conversation, which rapidly reached a wide audience across Europe and Australia. Banting was angry at the leak, having promised the Department of the Interior not to make any statements to the press prior to clearing them.

The article noted that Banting had given the journalist C. R. Greenaway repeated instances of how the fox fur trade always favoured the company: "For over $100,000 of fox skins, he estimated that the Eskimos had not received $5,000 worth of goods." He traced this treatment to health, consistent with reports made in previous years by RCMP officers, suggesting that "the result was a diet of 'flour, sea-biscuits, tea and tobacco,' with the skins that once were used for clothing traded merely for 'cheap whiteman's goods.'"

The HBC fur trade commissioner called Banting's remarks "false and slanderous", and a month later, the governor and general manager met Banting at the King Edward Hotel to demand a retraction. Banting stated that the reporter had betrayed his confidence, but did not retract his statement and reaffirmed that HBC was responsible for the death of Indigenous residents by supplying the wrong kind of food and introducing diseases into the Arctic. As A. Y. Jackson, the Group of Seven painter with whom Banting was travelling, noted in his memoir that since neither the governor nor the general manager had been to the Arctic, the meeting ended with them asking Banting's advice on what HBC ought to do: "He gave them some good advice and later he received a card at Christmas with the Governor's best wishes."

Banting maintained this position in his report to the Department of the Interior:

He noted that "infant mortality was high because of the undernourishment of the mother before birth"; that "white man's food leads to decay of native teeth"; that "tuberculosis has commenced. Saw several cases at Godhavn, Etah, Port Burwell, Arctic Bay"; that "an epidemic resembling influenza killed a considerable proportion of population at Port Burwell"; and that "the gravest danger faces the Eskimo in his transfer from a race-long hunter to a dependent trapper. White flour, sea-biscuits, tea and tobacco do not provide sufficient fuel to warm and nourish him". Furthermore, he discouraged the establishment of an Arctic hospital. The "proposed hospital at Pangnirtung would be a waste of money, as it could be reached by only a few natives". Banting's report contrasted starkly with the bland descriptions provided by the ship's physician, F. H. Stringer.

=== Latter 20th century ===
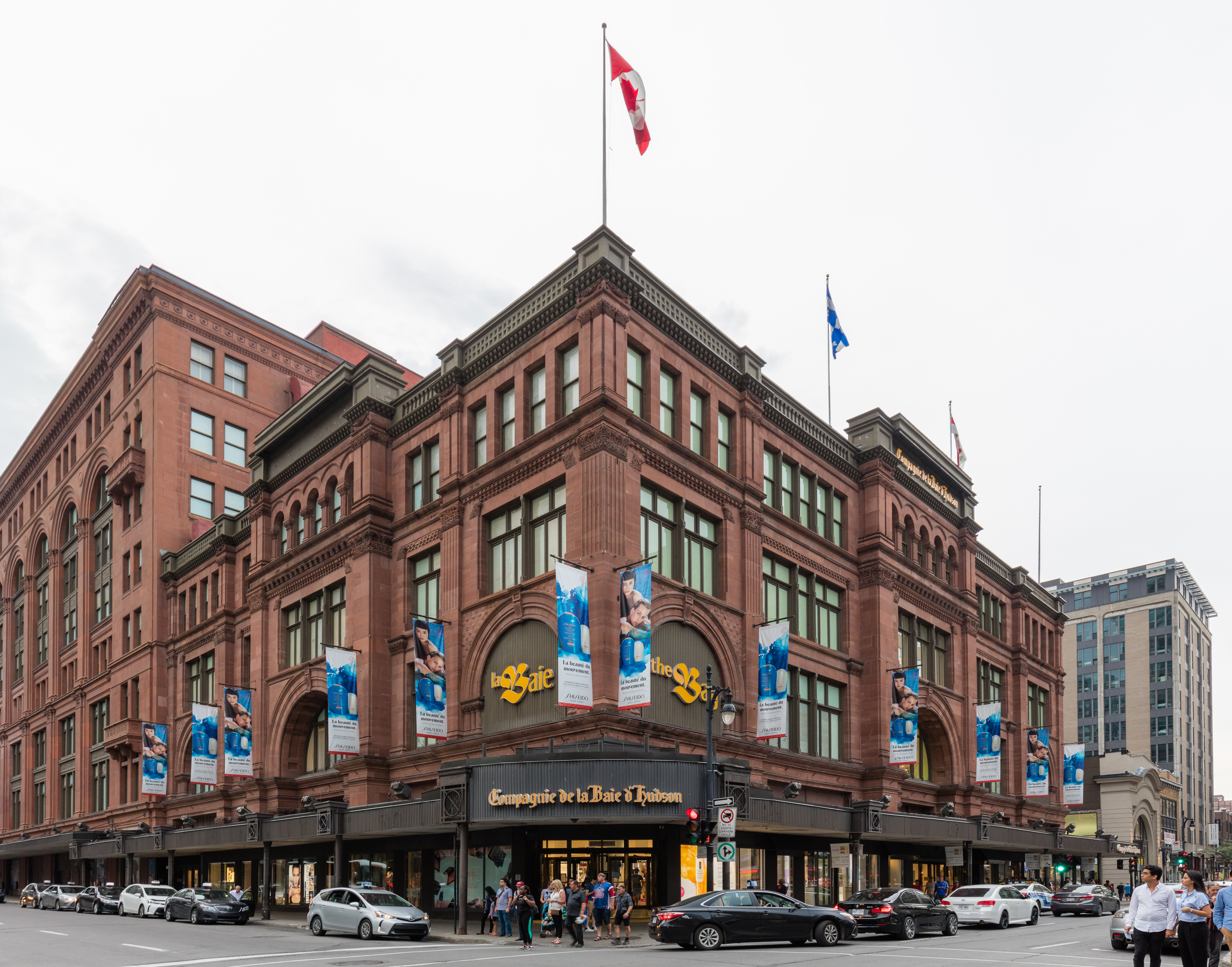
Hudson's Bay Montreal Downtown. Originally the flagship store for Morgan's, the department store chain was acquired by HBC in 1960.

HBOG also expanded during the 1960s, as it began shipping Canadian crude through a new link to the Glacier pipeline and on to the refinery in Billings, Montana. The company became the sixth-largest Canadian oil producer in 1967.

In 1970, on the company's 300th anniversary, as a result of punishing new British tax laws, the company relocated to Canada, and was rechartered as a Canadian business corporation under Canadian law, Head Office functions were transferred from London to Winnipeg. By 1974, as the company expanded into eastern Canada, head office functions were moved to Toronto.

In 1972, the company acquired the four-store Shop-Rite chain of catalogue stores. The chain quickly expanded to 65 stores in Ontario, but closed in 1982 due to declining sales. In these stores, little merchandise was displayed; customers made their selections from catalogues, and staff would retrieve the merchandise from storerooms. The HBC also acquired Freimans department stores in Ottawa and converted them to The Bay.

In 1973, HBOG acquired a 35 per cent stake in Siebens Oil and Gas, and, in 1979, it divested that interest. In 1980, it bought a controlling interest in Roxy Petroleum.

In 1978, the Zellers discount store chain made a bid to acquire the HBC; however, the HBC turned the tables and acquired Zellers.

In 1979, Canadian billionaire Kenneth Thomson won control of the company in a battle with George Weston Limited, and acquired a 75 per cent stake for $400 million. Thomson sold the company's oil and gas business, financial services, distillery, and other interests for approximately $550 million, transforming the company into a leaner, more focused operation. In the 1980s, sales and oil prices slipped, while debt from acquisitions piled up which led to Hudson's Bay Company selling its 10.1 per cent stake in HBOG to Dome Petroleum in 1981. HBC lost $330 million from 1983 to 1988 and although it returned to profitability in the late 1980s, it was hit by the early 1990s recession. On November 5, 1992, the Thomson family sold most of its stake in HBC but continued to be the largest shareholder. Thomson's remaining shares were ultimately sold five years later on September 15, 1997.

HBC sold its Canadian fur-auction business to Hudson's Bay Fur Sales Canada (now North American Fur Auctions). The Northern Stores Division was sold that same year to a group of investors and employees, which adopted The North West Company name three years later.

In 1991, the Bay agreed to stop retailing fur in response to complaints from people opposed to killing animals for this purpose. In 1997, the Bay reopened its fur salons to meet consumer demand.

== 21st-century history ==
=== 2000s ===
In December 2003, Maple Leaf Heritage Investments, a Nova Scotia-based company created to acquire shares of Hudson's Bay Company, announced that it was considering making an offer to acquire all or some of the common shares of Hudson's Bay Company. Maple Leaf Heritage Investments is a subsidiary of B-Bay Inc. Its CEO and chairman is American businesswoman Anita Zucker, widow of Jerry Zucker. Zucker had previously been the head of the Polymer Group, which acquired another Canadian institution, Dominion Textile.

It had been a member of the International Association of Department Stores from 2001 to 2005. On 26 January 2006, the HBC's board agreed to a bid from Jerry Zucker. The South Carolina based billionaire financier was a longtime HBC minority shareholder. In a 9 March 2006 press release, the HBC announced that Zucker would replace Yves Fortier as governor and George Heller as CEO, becoming the first US citizen to lead the company. After Jerry Zucker's death in April 2008 from brain cancer, the board named his widow, Anita Zucker, as HBC Governor and HBC Deputy-Governor Rob Johnston as CEO.

From 2004 to 2008, the HBC owned and operated a small chain of off-price stores called Designer Depot. The concept was similar to the Winners and HomeSense retail format, but Designer Depot did not meet sales expectations, and its nine stores were sold.

On 16 July 2008 shortly after Zucker's death, the company was sold to NRDC Equity Partners for just over $1.1 billion, a private equity firm based in Purchase, New York, which already owned Lord & Taylor, the oldest department store in the United States. The Canadian and US holdings were transferred to NRDC Equity Partners' holding company, Hudson's Bay Trading Company, as of July 2008.

=== 2010s ===
HBC's coat of arms logo (used from 2009 to 2013)

Another HBC chain, Fields, was sold to a private firm in 2012. Established in 1950, Fields was acquired by Zellers in 1976. When Zellers was acquired by HBC in 1978, Fields became part of the HBC portfolio.

In October 2012, the HBC announced a $1.6-billion initial public offering (IPO); Baker planned to use the IPO to allow Canadian ownership to return to the company, and to help pay off debts with other partners.

In January 2016, HBC announced it would expand deeper into digital space with the acquisition of an online flash sales site, the Gilt Groupe, for US$250,000,000. HBC also announced its expansion into the Netherlands in May 2016 with the takeover of 20 former Vroom & Dreesmann (V&D) sites by 2017. V&D, a historic Dutch department store chain, had gone bankrupt and shut down in early 2016. As of November 2017, the company also expanded retail operations into Europe, including five Saks Off Fifth stores in Germany.

In early 2017, the Hudson's Bay Company made an overture to Macy's for a potential takeover of the US department store chain. Later, HBC also considered a purchase of Neiman Marcus Group Inc. It did not proceed with either deal.

On 1 April 2018, HBC disclosed that more than five million credit and debit cards used for in-store purchases had been recently breached by hackers. The compromised credit card transactions took place at Saks Fifth Avenue, Saks Off 5th, and Lord & Taylor stores. The hack had been discovered by Gemini Advisory, which called the breach "amongst the biggest and most damaging to ever hit retail companies". A July 2019 hack of Capital One, which provides HBC Mastercards, did not affect the HBC credit cards or card applications, according to HBC.

In June 2019, a consortium including chairman Richard Baker, Rhône Group, WeWork, Hanover Investments (Luxembourg) and Abrams Capital Management announced that it wanted to take the company private. The group then owned just over 50 per cent of HBC shares. In mid-August, the consortium said that it owned 57 per cent of the HBC shares. By 19 August 2019, however, Canadian investment firm Catalyst Capital Group Inc. said it had acquired enough shares to block the plan. A US company, Land & Buildings Investment Management, the owner of over 6 per cent of the shares, had also criticized the Baker plan. In March 2020, Baker and a group of shareholders were successful in taking the company private.

HBC sold Galeria Kaufhof, Galeria Inno, Gilt Groupe, and Lord & Taylor by August 2019. A feature article by Bloomberg News mentioned that CEO Helena Foulkes, recruited in 2018, "had helped improve the bottom line at Hudson's Bay". She was selling assets "to put the company on more solid financial footing" and could then focus on Saks Fifth Avenue and the Bay. On the other hand, Bloomberg suggested that millennial shoppers prefer to make purchases online, or direct from various brands' own stores, and that HBC "has yet to offer something they can't find somewhere else and risks drifting into irrelevance".

=== 2020s ===
In February 2020, shareholders of the company voted in favour of a plan to become a private company at a special meeting of shareholders. Under the plan of arrangement, the company was to be owned by a group of continuing shareholders led by HBC governor and executive chairman Richard Baker. Effective 3 March 2020, the company was delisted from the Toronto Stock Exchange, with Richard A. Baker replacing Foulkes as CEO.

On March 16, 2022, it was announced that HBC and Sycamore Partners were preparing bids to buy Kohl's.

In 2023, Hudson's Bay officially stopped selling animal fur products.

=== 2025 liquidation and dissolution ===
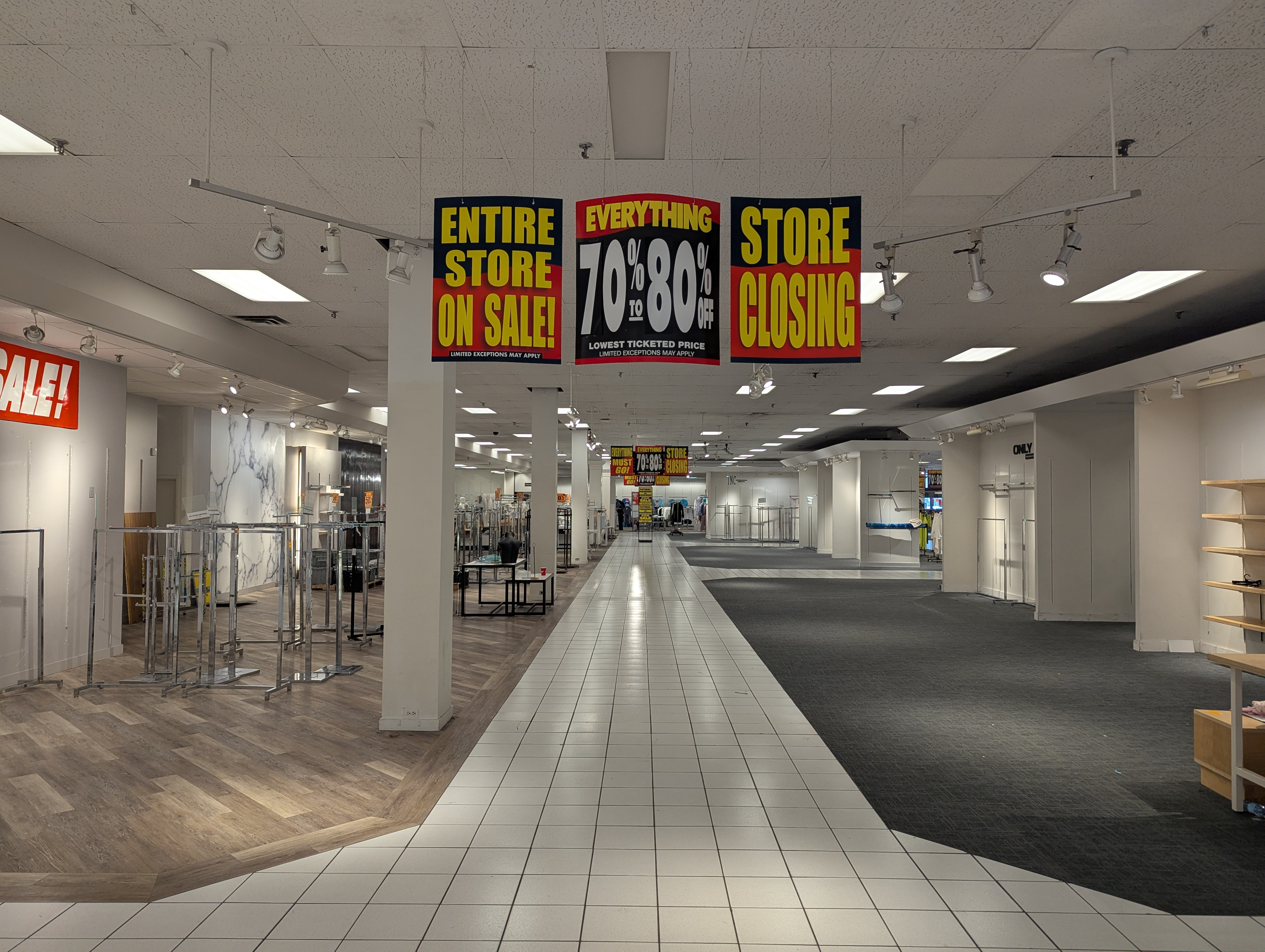
Store closing sale in May 2025

HBC filed for creditor protection in Canada under the Companies' Creditors Arrangement Act on 7 March 2025, after failing to secure financing and consistently delaying in paying suppliers. The filing came during a trade war with the United States and an escalation of the ongoing retail apocalypse due to the COVID-19 pandemic. Chief financial officer Jennifer Bewley warned that if funding was not received within days, it would struggle with payroll obligations, lease defaults, and possible store closings. HBC began liquidating 74 Hudson's Bay stores, two Saks Fifth Avenue stores, and all 13 Saks Off Fifth outlets later that month, resulting in 9,000 employee layoffs. HBC intended for six Hudson's Bay stores in Ontario and Quebec to stay open. However, on 23 April, the company announced the liquidation of all remaining stores after a court ruling determined that it was unlikely that they would be bought. All remaining Hudson's Bay, Saks Fifth Avenue, and Saks Off Fifth stores were permanently closed by 1 June.

In early May, the liquidator solicited bids for HBC's leases, intellectual property, and real estate. By 3 June, HBC had completed its efforts to auction off its store leases. 62 leases had no bidder interest, and were returned to their landlords, and 12 properties were co-owned by RioCan, who decided to put them into receivership. On 23 May, successful bids were made by Ruby Liu Commercial Investment Corporation for 28 Hudson's Bay store leases. Objections were made by landlords for 23 of the leases, citing an insufficient business plan, financing, or retail expertise. On 23 June, the court approved the acquisition of 3 leases where Liu was the landlord. By late July 2025, HBC reached a deal with YM Inc. to sell the leases to five stores in Ontario, Alberta, and Manitoba for $5.3 million. On 31 July, a deal was reached with Ivanhoe Realties Inc. to sell the lease to a store in a mall owned by Ivanhoe Cambridge. On 24 October, the Ontario Supreme Court sided with landlords for the 23 disputed store leases and rejected Liu's bid to acquire them.

On 27 May, it was announced by the liquidator that HBC's intellectual property rights had been purchased by Canadian Tire for $30 million. The property consisted of the Hudson's Bay name, trademarks, logos, coat of arms, and stripes pattern, as well as many slogans, including Zellers's catchphrase, "Lowest price is the law". However, the Zellers brand itself was not acquired by Canadian Tire. The purchase of intellectual property by Canadian Tire required that HBC be renamed during the final liquidation proceedings to avoid confusion with the trademark acquired. By August 13, the company changed its name to 1242939 B.C. Unlimited Liability Co., which will be responsible for selling the former HBC's leases and auctioning its remaining art and artifacts.

In August 2025, filings revealed that the Hudson's Bay trademarks has transferred Zellers trademarks to Les Ailes de la Mode Inc., a defunct Quebec-based retailer run by Issac Benitah, owner of Fairweather and International Clothiers.

In October 2025, Canadian Tire announced that they would be marketing Hudson's Bay Point Blankets at their stores.

A 2026 Canadian Press report in February indicated that the company had 8 remaining employees and was still being unwound through court proceedings. The eighth and final auction of Hudson's Bay artifacts hosted by Heffel Fine Art Auction House was held on July 2, 2026. A total of $9.5 million was recovered from these online sales.

== Canadian stores ==
=== Hudson's Bay (1881–2025) ===
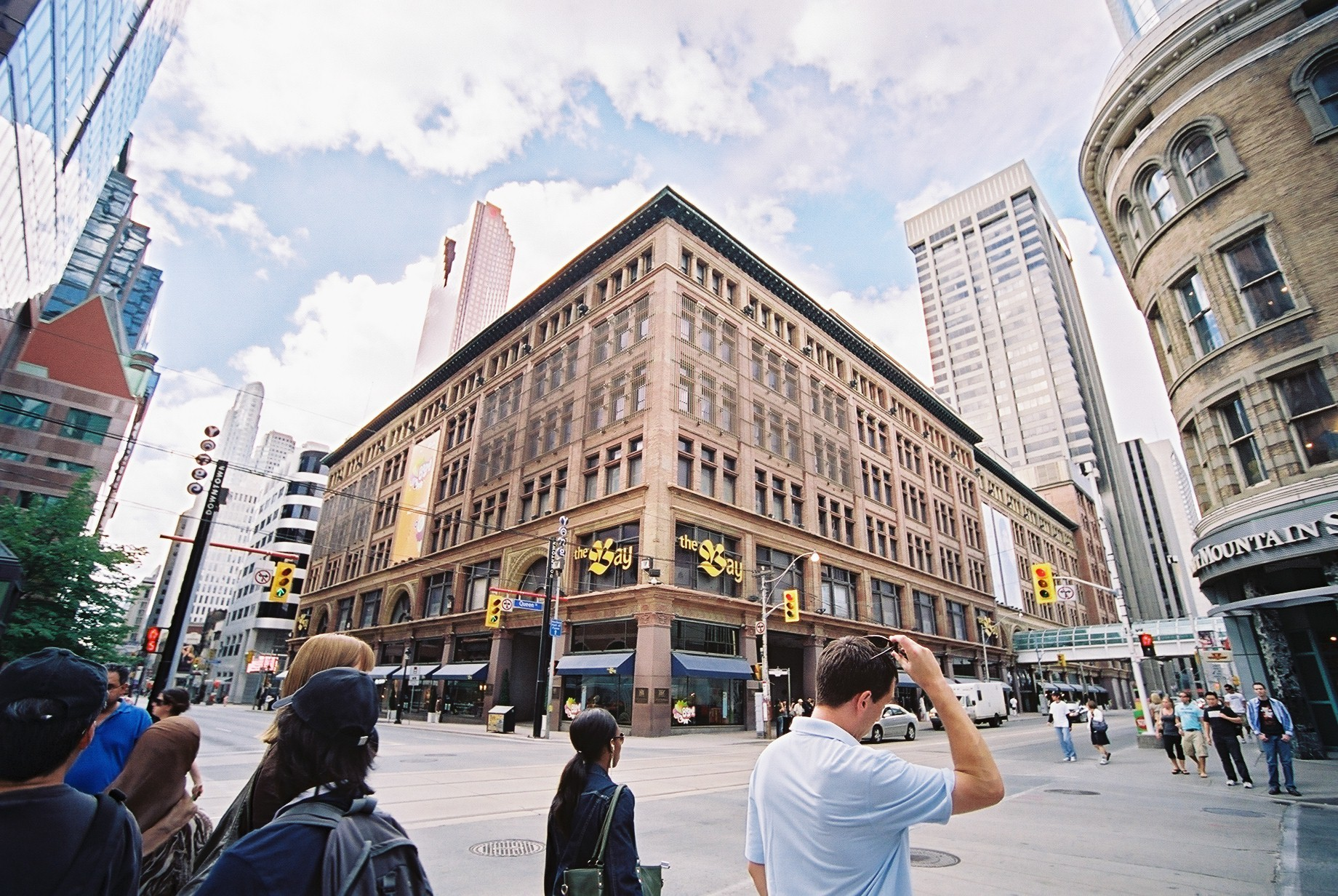
The former Hudson's Bay flagship store in Toronto, converted from the Simpsons flagship store (2007)

The first Hudson's Bay Company department store opened in Winnipeg, Manitoba in 1881. The chain was rebranded "the Bay" in 1965, and "Hudson's Bay" in 2013.

HBC acquired the Morgan's department stores in 1960 and converted its Ontario stores to the Bay by 1968 and its Quebec stores to la Baie in 1973. Before the conversions, HBC updated the Morgan's logo to match the Bay's visual identity in 1965. HBC acquired the Simpsons department stores in Ontario and Quebec in 1978 and converted them to the Bay in 1991. The related Simpsons-Sears department stores were not acquired by the Bay, and became Sears Canada in 1978.

=== Zellers (1978–2013) ===
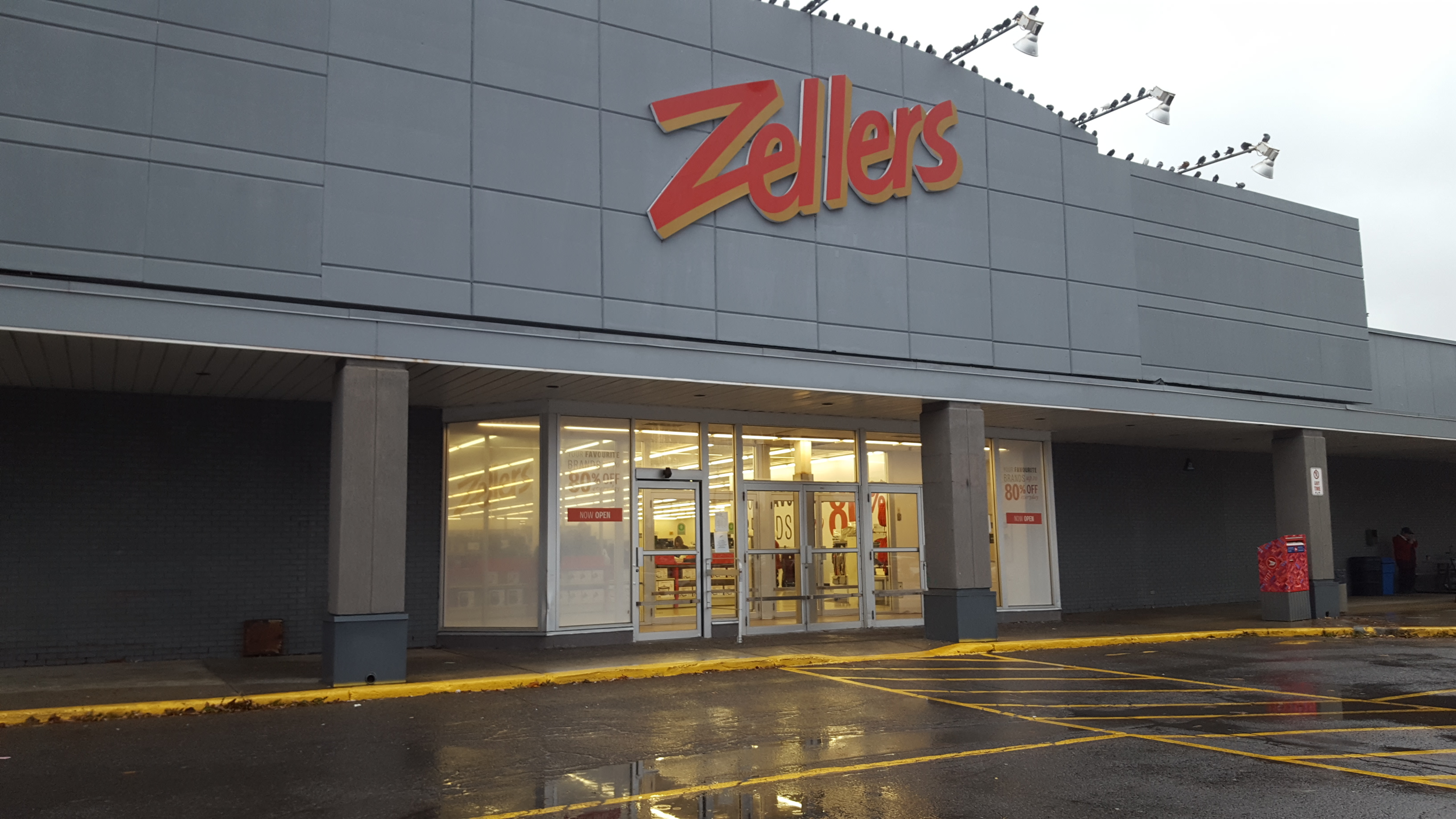
The former Zellers in Nepean, Ontario, converted from Kmart and one of the final three stores (2017)

Zellers was founded in 1931 by Walter P. Zeller, and acquired by HBC in 1978. It expanded in part with the HBC acquisitions and conversions of Towers Department Stores (1990) and Kmart Canada (1998).

In September 2011, the HBC announced that it would sell the majority of the Zellers leases for $1.825 billion to the US-based retailer Target and shutter all of their remaining locations by early 2013. Target used the acquisition of this real estate as a means to enable its entry in the Canadian market. HBC used some of the proceeds to pay down debt and to invest in growing its Hudson's Bay and Lord & Taylor banners. In January 2013, it was confirmed that three Zellers locations, re-purposed as discount department stores for The Bay and Home Outfitters, would remain open. The Target Canada chain folded in 2015; the leases were subsequently returned to landlords or re-sold to other retailers. Zellers was still owned by HBC as two remaining stores following the sale of its lease portfolio to Target Canada in 2011. Those stores closed in January 2020.

In August 2022, the Hudson's Bay Company announced it would be reviving the Zellers brand through online shopping and within Hudson's Bay physical locations in 2023. It operated in a store-within-a-store format across Canada.

=== Home Outfitters (1999–2019) ===
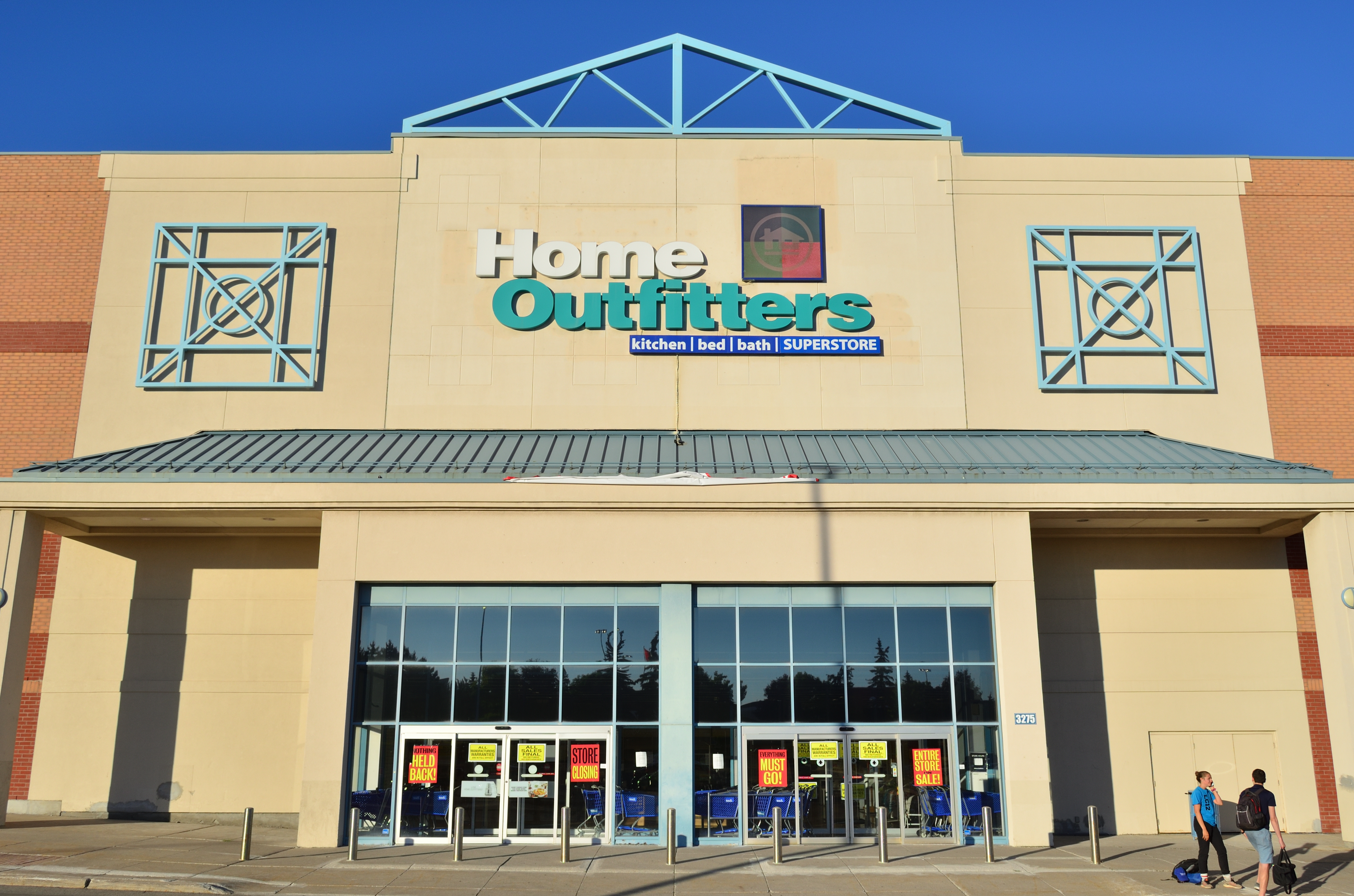
Home Outfitters at First Markham Place (now closed) in Markham, Ontario

Home Outfitters originally launched in 1998 as Bed, Bath & More, before being revamped and relaunched under the new name in 1999. The chain peaked at 69 locations in October 2014. It sold bedding, towels, housewares, and other home accessories. In July 2014, HBC announced that it would begin integrating Home Outfitters into its Hudson's Bay retail division (including increased availability of its product line through Hudson's Bay locations and its website), along with the closure of 2 stores. In 2016, HBC rebranded three Home Outfitters locations in Winnipeg under the banner Hudson's Bay Home as a pilot. The stores closed a few years later, along with Home Outfitters. In February 2019, HBC announced all 37 locations of Home Outfitters would be phased out.

== International stores ==
=== United States ===
==== Lord & Taylor (2012–2019) ====
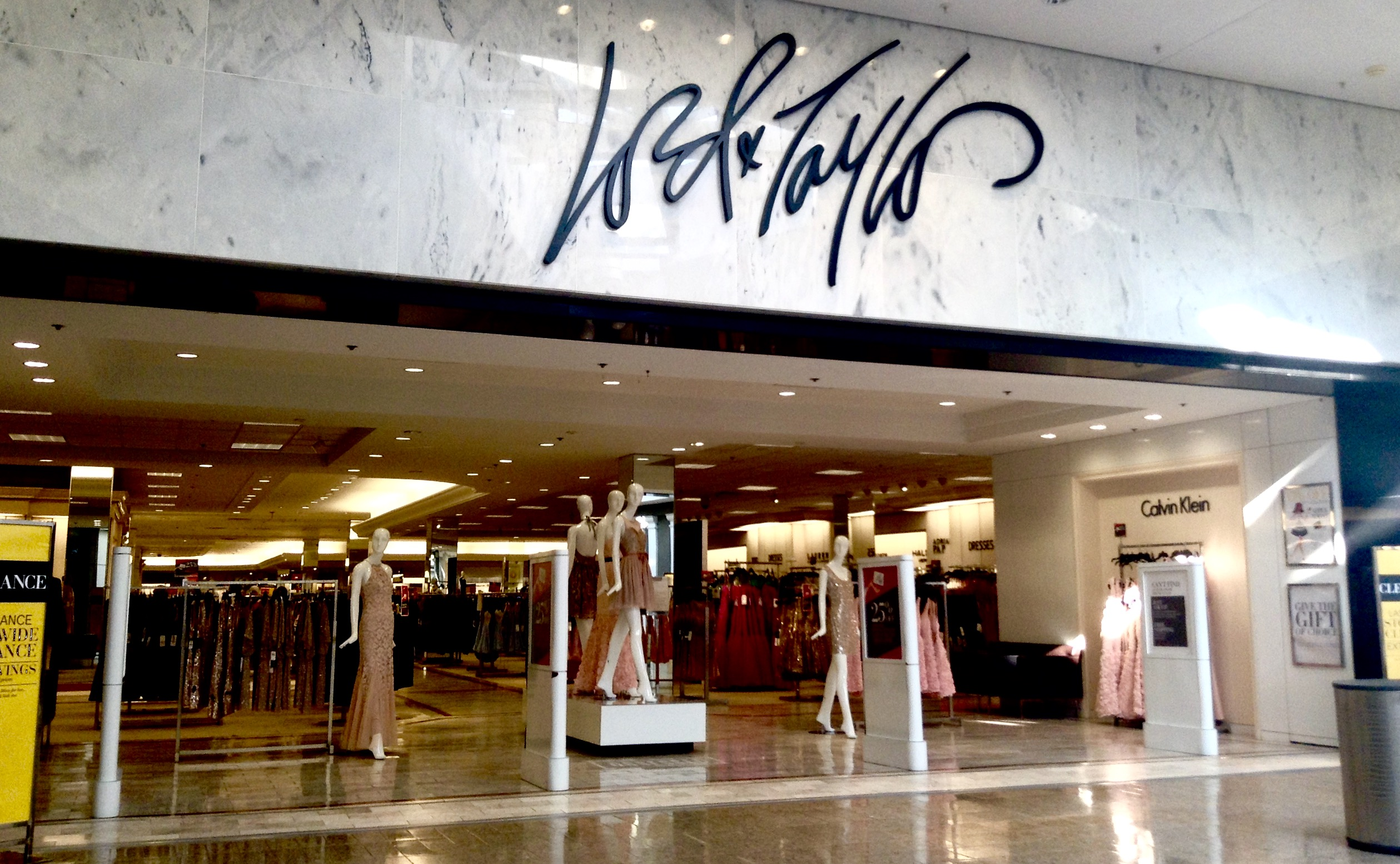
A Lord & Taylor store in 2015

On 24 January 2012, the Financial Post reported that Richard Baker (owner of NDRC and governor of Hudson's Bay Company) had dissolved Hudson's Bay Trading Company and that the HBC would now also operate the Lord & Taylor chain. At the time, the company was run by president Bonnie Brooks. Baker remained governor and CEO of the business, and Donald Watros stayed on as chief operating officer.

In 2018, HBC in a joint venture sold the building that housed its flagship Lord & Taylor store on Fifth Avenue in Manhattan to WeWork Property Advisors for $850 million. WeWork was set to occupy the uppermost floors of the building, with the rest of the building remaining a flagship space for Lord & Taylor. The deal also included the use of floors of certain HBC-owned department stores in New York, Toronto, Vancouver and Germany as WeWork's shared office workspaces.

In August 2019, HBC announced that it would sell their Lord & Taylor business to Le Tote Inc., which was to pay CA$99.5 million in cash when the deal closes (probably before year end 2019) and an additional CA$33.2 million two years later. HBC was to get a 25 per cent equity stake in Le Tote. The buyer would retain the stores' inventory, with an estimated value of CA$284.2 million. The deal, expected to close before year end, required HBC to pay the stores' rent for at least three years, leading one news report to describe it as "Not a clean exit". The liability to HBC for the rents was estimated at CA$77 million cash per year.

==== Saks Fifth Avenue (2013–2024) ====
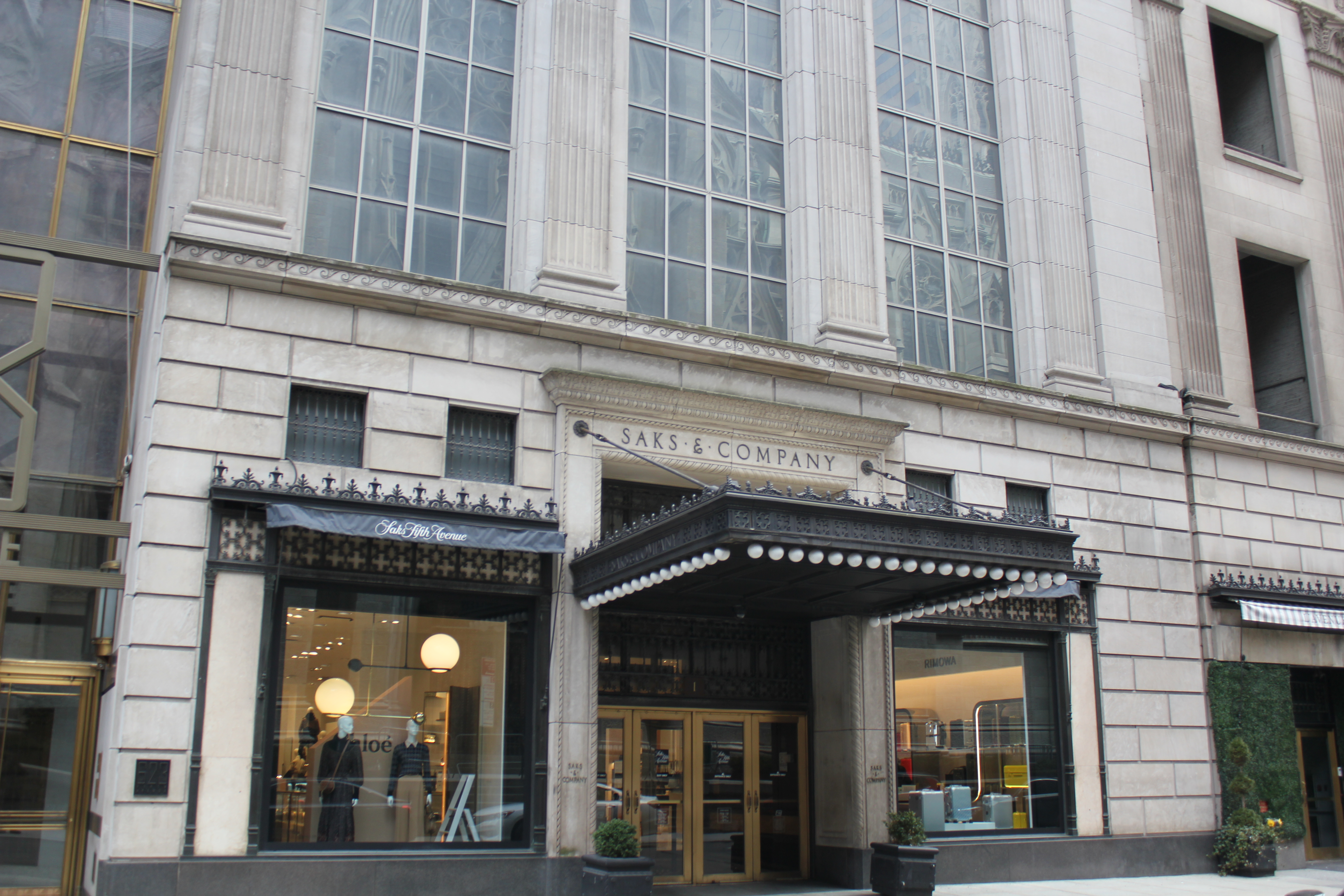
The Saks Fifth Avenue flagship store. The Saks Fifth Avenue chain was bought by HBC in 2013.

On 29 July 2013, Hudson's Bay Company announced that it would buy Saks, Inc., operator of the American Saks Fifth Avenue brand, for US$2.9 billion, or $16 per share. The merger was completed on 3 November 2013. The company stated that Canadian consumers would soon see Saks stores opening in their country as a result of the purchase. After the purchase was finalized, HBC posted a net loss of $124.2 million in the third quarter of 2013, due to the cost of the purchase and promotions.

On 4 July 2024, Hudson's Bay Company announced it would acquire Neiman Marcus Group for $2.65 billion, concluding years of negotiations. Hudson's Bay placed its US assets into a new subsidiary, Saks Global, in November 2024 and it was this company that finalized the purchase of Neiman Marcus Group the following month. The acquisition cost $2.7 billion and brought together Bergdorf Goodman, Neiman Marcus, Saks Fifth Avenue and Saks Off 5th. The purchase was supported with financing from Amazon (who undertook to work with the group "to innovate on behalf of customers and brand partners"), Authentic Brands Group, G-III Apparel Group and Salesforce. The acquisition raised the possibility of store closures across the Saks Fifth Avenue and Neiman Marcus chains. In an interview with Vogue Business, Marc Metrick (CEO of Saks Global Operating Group) said that this was only the beginning of the group's ambitions and that they were thinking of what the entity might look like internationally.

=== Europe ===
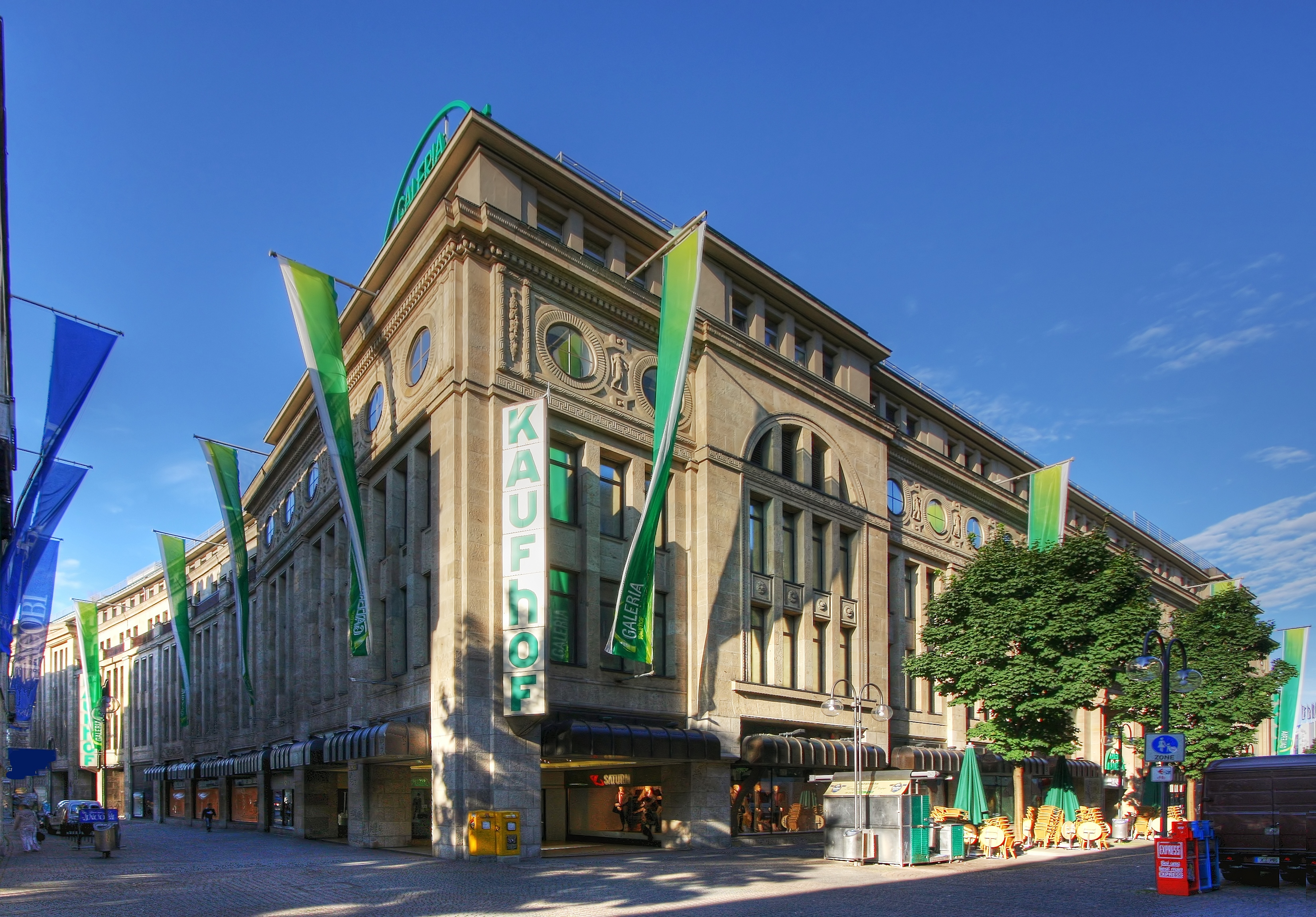
A Galeria Kaufhof in Köln. The chain was owned by HBC from 2015 to 2019.

HBC had acquired the German department store chain Galeria Kaufhof and its Belgian subsidiary, Galeria Inno, from Metro Group in September 2015 for US$3.2 billion.

On 1 November 2017, HBC received an unsolicited offer from Austrian firm Signa Holding for Kaufhof and other real estate. An unnamed source told CNBC that the value of the offer was approximately €3 billion. This information on the offer was also reiterated in a press release by activist shareholder Land & Buildings Investment Management, which urged HBC to accept the offer; the company replied that the offer was incomplete and did not provide indication of financing for the deal. In late 2018, Galeria Kaufhof and Karstadt merged as part of a spin off.

HBC announced its intent to sell the last 49.99 per cent of Galeria Kaufhof and Galeria Inno shares it held to Austrian firm Signa Holding in June 2019. The sale of the real estate in Germany had gained US$1.5 billion (€1 billion) for HBC. At that time, HBC still had a retail operation in the Netherlands, using the Vroom & Dreesmann locations it had purchased in 2017. On 31 August 2019, the company announced that all 15 of those stores would be sold by year end.

== List of retail operations ==
List of retail operations owned by HBC
Name	Year founded	Year acquired	Year divested	Year defunct	Notes
Designer Depot	2004	—N/a	2008	—N/a	Sold to INC Group of Companies
Fields	1950	1978	2012	—N/a	Sold to FHC Holdings
Freimans	1918	1972	—N/a	1973	Converted to the Bay
Galeria Kaufhof	1879	2015	2019	2019	
Gilt Groupe	2007	2016	2018	—N/a	Sold to Rue La La
Home Outfitters	1999	—N/a	—N/a	2019	
Hudson's Bay	1881	—N/a	—N/a	2025	Previously named and still colloquially "the Bay"
I. G. Baker Company	1866	1891	—N/a	1891	
Kmart Canada	1963	1998	—N/a	1998	Converted to Zellers
Lord & Taylor	1826	2012	2019	2021	Sold to Le Tote
Morgan's	1845	1960	—N/a	1973	Converted to the Bay
Saks Fifth Avenue	1867	2013	2024	—N/a	Spun-off into Saks Global
Saks Off 5th	1990	2013	2024	—N/a	Spun-off into Saks Global
Shop-Rite	1970	1972	—N/a	1982	
Simpsons	1872	1978	—N/a	1991	Converted to the Bay
Towers Department Stores	1960	1990	—N/a	1991	Converted to Zellers
Woodward's	1892	1993	—N/a	1993	Converted to the Bay and Zellers
Zellers	1931	1978	—N/a	2013	Store-within-a-store concept tested within Hudson's Bay from 2023 until 2025

== Brand identity ==
Following the 2012 IPO, HBC had also introduced a new corporate logo of its own (reviving a wordmark from the original HBC flag), but the new logo was not intended to be a consumer-facing brand.

=== Olympic outfitter ===
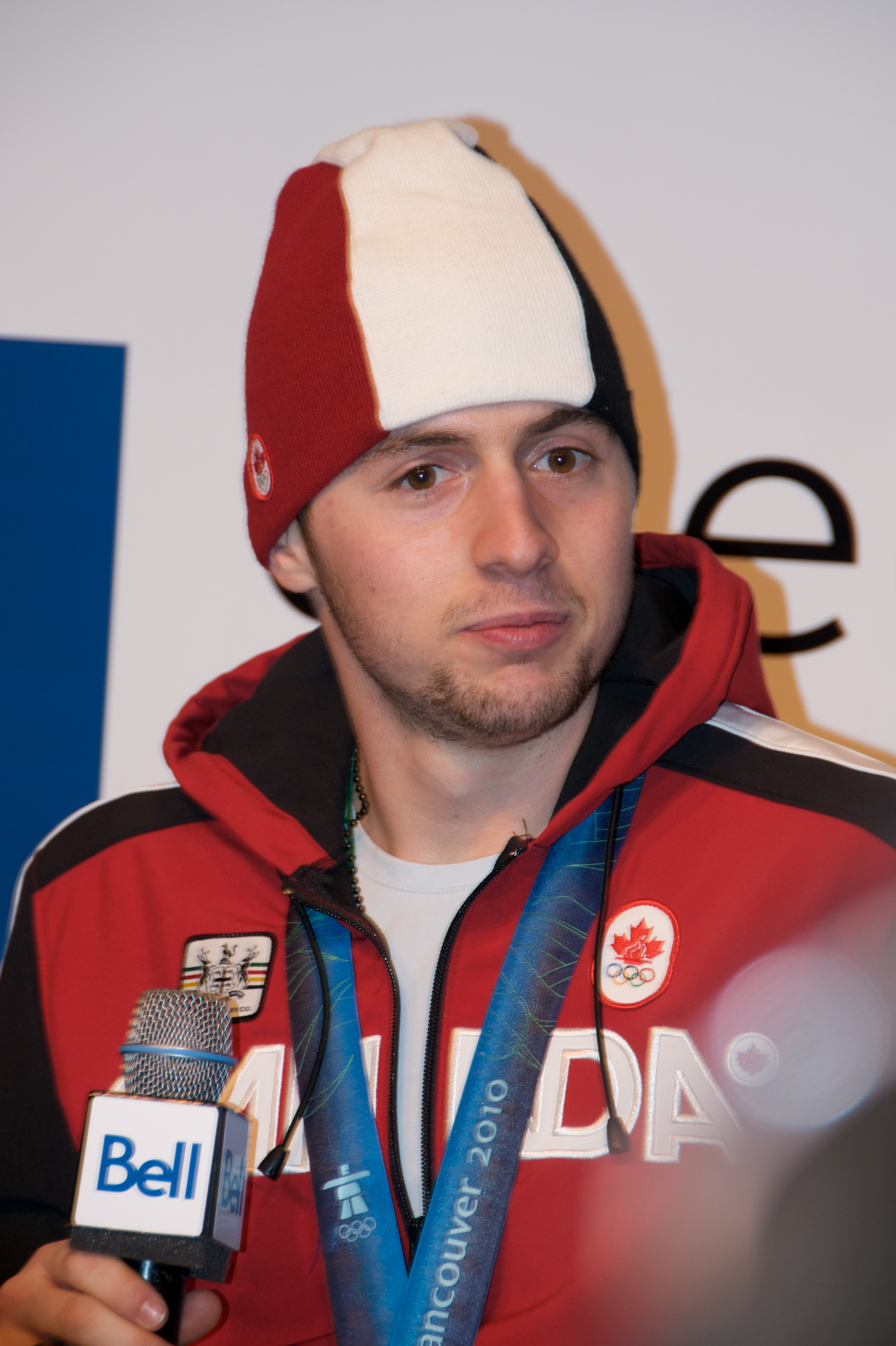
Alexandre Bilodeau, a winter Olympian for Canada, wearing HBC apparel made officially for the Canadian Olympic team

The HBC was the official outfitter of clothing for members of the Canadian Olympic team in 1936, 1960, 1964, 1968, 2006, 2008, 2010, 2012, 2014 and 2016. The sponsorship was renewed through 2020. Beginning in the late 2000s, HBC used its status as the official Canadian Olympics team outfitter to gain global exposure, as part of a turnaround plan that included shedding under-performing brands and luring new high-end brands.

On 2 March 2005, the company was announced as the new clothing outfitter for the Canadian Olympic team, in a $100 million deal, providing apparel for the 2006, 2008, 2010, and 2012 games, having outbid the existing Canadian Olympic wear-supplier, Roots Canada, which had supplied Canada's Olympic teams from 1998 to 2004. The Canadian Olympic collection was sold through Hudson's Bay (and Zellers until 2013 when the Zellers leases were sold to Target Canada).

HBC's 2006 Winter Olympics and 2008 Summer Olympics uniforms and toques received a mixed reception for their multicoloured stripes (green, red, yellow, blue) which seemed to be not-so-subtle advertising for HBC rather than representing the Canadian Olympic team's traditional colours of red and white (with black as a secondary), in contrast to well-received Root's 1998 collection with its trendy red letter jackets and Poor Boy caps. HBC produced 80 per cent to 90 per cent of their Olympic clothes in China which was criticized, as Roots ensured that the Olympic clothes were made in Canada using Canadian material.

HBC's apparel for the 2010 Winter Olympics held in Vancouver proved to be extremely successful, in part because Canada was the host country and their athletes had a record medal haul. The red-and-white mittens featuring a large maple leaf that were sold for $10, with one-third of the proceeds going to the Canadian Olympic Committee, proved very popular, as were the "Canada" hoodies.

The HBC's 2010 Winter Olympics apparel was also controversial due to a knitted, machine-made sweater that looked like a Cowichan sweater. After a meeting between HBC representatives and Cowichan Tribes, a compromise was made between the parties; knitters could sell their sweaters at the downtown Vancouver HBC store, alongside the HBC imitations.

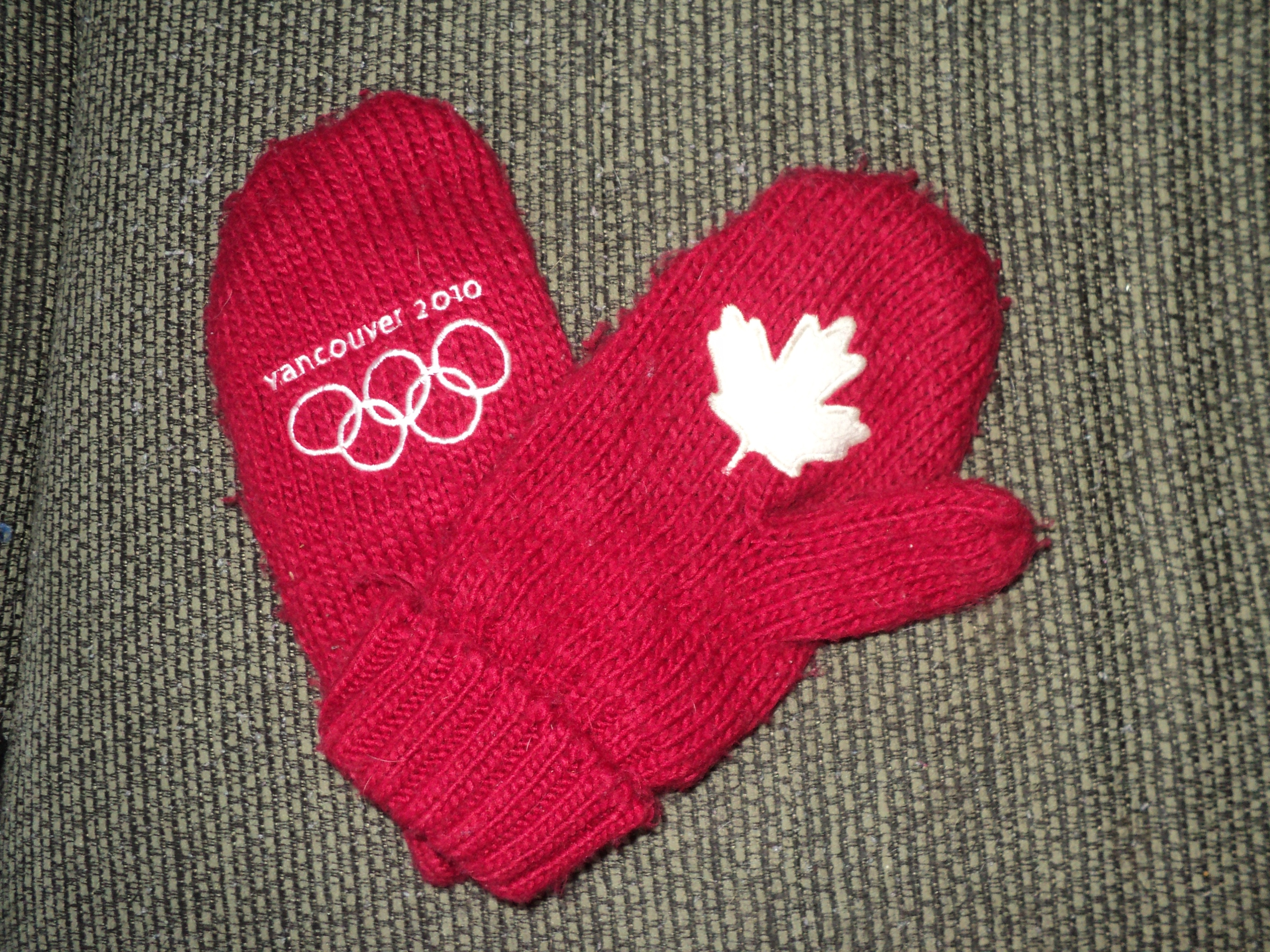
Red mittens sold by HBC for the 2010 Winter Olympics in Vancouver

Lord Sebastian Coe, chairman of the 2012 London Olympic Games Organizing Committee, who attended the Vancouver Olympics, noted that Canadians were passionate in embracing the games with their "Canada" hoodies and their red mittens (of which 2.6 million pairs sold that year). HBC has continued to produce these red mittens for subsequent Olympic Games.

In 2021, it was announced that beginning with the 2022 Winter Olympics, Lululemon would replace the HBC as Canada's Olympic outfitter.

=== Charitable involvement ===
The HBC was involved in community and charity activities. The HBC Rewards Community Program raised funds for community causes. The HBC Foundation was a charity agency involved in social issues and service. The HBC used to sponsor the annual HBC Run for Canada, a series of public-participation runs and walks held across the country on Canada Day to raise funds for Canadian athletes. The company discontinued this event in 2009.

=== Archives and artifacts ===
The legacy of the HBC has been maintained in part by the detailed record-keeping and archiving of material by the company. Before 1974, the records of the HBC were kept in the London office headquarters. The HBC opened an archives department to researchers in 1931. In 1974, Hudson's Bay Company Archives (HBCA) were transferred from London and placed on deposit with the Manitoba archives in Winnipeg. The company granted public access to the collection the following year.

On 27 January 1994, the company's archives were formally donated to the Archives of Manitoba.

At the time of the donation, the appraised value of the records was nearly $60 million. A foundation, Hudson's Bay Company History Foundation funded through the tax savings resulting from the donation, was established to support the operations of the HBC Archive as a division of the Archives of Manitoba, along with other activities and programs. More than two kilometres (1.2 mi) of filed documents and hundreds of microfilm reels are now stored in a special climate-controlled vault in the Manitoba Archives Building.

In 2007, Hudson's Bay Company Archives became part of the United Nations "Memory of the World Programme" project, under UNESCO. The records covered the HBC history from the founding of the company in 1670. The records contained business transactions, medical records, personal journals of officials, inventories, company reports, etc.

When the HBC dissolved in 2025, the Heffel Gallery was appointed to auction off 1,700 pieces of art and 2,700 artifacts including the 1670 royal charter.

=== Charter of the Hudson's Bay Company ===
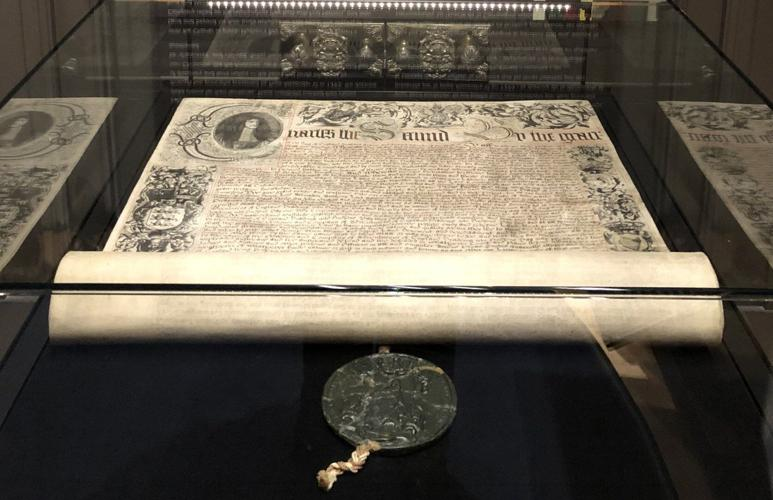
Original charter of the HBC, declared in 1670

The Charter was issued by Charles II of England on May 2, 1670, on parchment with the Kings seal. It gave authority to the "Governor and Company of Adventurers of England Trading into Hudson's Bay."

The document was originally kept by the company in London, although likely not at Windsor Castle. During the London Blitz, the charter was kept in manor house in rural Hertfordshire to keep it safe and then from the 1970s until the present, the document had been displayed at HBC's head office in Toronto. Between 2020 and 2021, it was loaned to the Manitoba Museum.

==== Rent obligation under charter ====
Under the charter establishing Hudson's Bay Company, the company was required to give two elk skins and two black beaver pelts to the English king, then Charles II, or his heirs, whenever the monarch visited Rupert's Land. The exact text from the 1670 Charter reads:

...Yielding and paying yearly to us and our heirs and successors for the same two Elks and two Black beavers whensoever and as often as We, our heirs and successors shall happen to enter into the said Countries, Territories and Regions hereby granted.

The ceremony was first conducted with the Prince of Wales (the future Edward VIII) in 1927, then with King George VI in 1939, and last with his daughter, Queen Elizabeth II in 1959 and 1970. On the last such visit, the pelts were given in the form of two live beavers, which the Queen donated to the Winnipeg Zoo in Assiniboine Park. However, when the company permanently moved its headquarters to Canada, the Charter was amended to remove the rent obligation. Each of the four "rent ceremonies" took place in or around Winnipeg.

==== Donation ====
In December 2025, the Weston family and Thomson family agreed to jointly pay $18 million for the royal charter document and donate it joint ownership of the Archives of Manitoba, the Manitoba Museum, the Canadian Museum of History, and the Royal Ontario Museum.

== Corporate affairs ==
=== Historical hierarchy ===
In the 18th and 19th centuries, Hudson's Bay Company operated with a very rigid employee hierarchy. This hierarchy essentially broke down into two levels; the officers and the servants. The officers were the factors, masters and chief traders, clerks and surgeons. The servants were the tradesmen, boatmen, and labourers. The officers essentially ran the fur trading posts. They had many duties which included supervising the workers in their trade posts, valuing the furs, and keeping trade and post records. In 1821, when Hudson's Bay Company and the North West Company merged, the hierarchy became even stricter and the lines between officers and servants became virtually impossible to cross. Officers in charge of individual trading posts had much responsibility because they were directly in charge of enforcing the policies made by the governor and committee (the board) of the company. One of these policies was the price of particular furs and trade goods. These prices were called the Official and Comparative Standards. Made-Beaver, the quality measurement of the pelt, was the means of exchange used by Hudson's Bay Company to define the Official and Comparative Standards. Because the governor was stationed in London, England, they needed to have reliable officers managing the trade posts halfway around the world. Because the fur trade was a very dynamic market, HBC needed to have some form of flexibility when dealing with prices and traders. Price fluctuation was deferred to the officers in charge of the trade posts, and the head office recorded any difference between the company's standard and that set by the individual officers. Overplus, or any excess revenue gained by officers, was strictly documented to insure that it was not being pocketed and taken from the company. This strict yet flexible hierarchy exemplifies how Hudson's Bay Company was able to be so successful while still having its central management and trade posts located so far apart.

Hierarchical order pre-1821

#	Job title
	OFFICERS
1	Chief Factor
2	Second [Factor]
3	Master [of a trading station]
4	Sloopmaster; Surgeon
5	Writer
6	Apprentice
	SERVANTS
1	Tradesman; Steersman
2	Canoeman; Bowsman
3	Middleman
4	Labourer

Hierarchical order 1821–1871

#	Job title	Pay per year
	COMMISSIONED OFFICERS	
1	Governor of Rupert's Land	Performance Pay
2	Chief Factor	Two shares
3	Chief Trader	One share
	GENTLEMEN	
4	Clerk	£75–100
5	Apprenticed Clerk	£25–27
	NON-GENTLEMEN	
6	Postmaster	£40–75
7	Guide; Interpreter; Sloopmaster	£30–45
8	Apprentice postmaster	
	SERVANTS	
9	Tradesman; Steersman; Boatman; Bowsman; Middleman; Labourer	£16–40

==== Progression ====
In the 19th century, career progression for officers, together referred to as the Commissioned Gentlemen, was to enter the company as a fur trader. Typically, they were men who had the capital to invest in starting up their trading. They sought to be promoted to the rank of Chief Trader. A Chief Trader would be in charge of an individual post and was entitled to one share of the company's profits. Chief Factors sat in council with the Governors and were the heads of districts. They were entitled to two shares of the company's profits or losses. The average income of a Chief Trader was £360 and that of a Chief Factor was £720.

=== Modern-day executive board ===
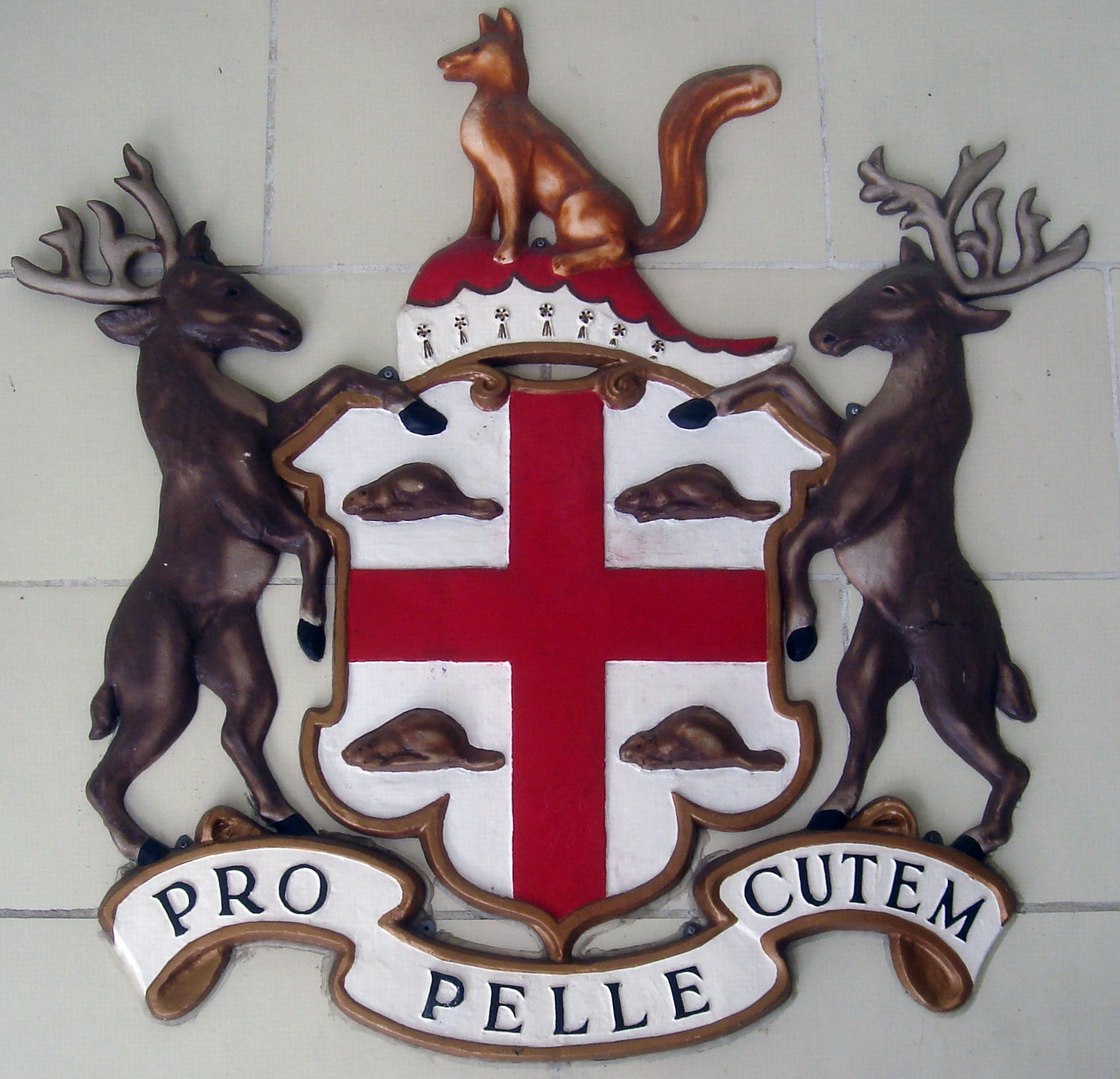
Heraldic achievement of Hudson's Bay Company: Argent, a cross gules between four beavers passant proper. Crest: On a chapeau gules turned up ermine a fox sejant proper. Supporters: Two bucks proper. Latin Motto: Latin: pro pelle cutem, lit. 'skin for leather' apparently a play on Job, 2:4: Pellem pro pelle "skin for skin".

The Company's flag from 1682 to 1707

The Company's flag from 1707 to 1801

Flag of the Hudson's Bay Company from 1801 to 1965

As of January 2018, the members of the board of directors of Hudson's Bay Company were:

- Richard A. Baker
- Robert C. Baker
- Eric Gross
- Steven Langman
- David G. Leith
- William L. Mack
- Lee S. Neibart
- Denise Pickett
- Wayne Pommen
- Earl Rotman
- Matthew Rubel
- Andrea Wong

=== Governors ===
Chronological list of governors of the Hudson's Bay Company:

1. 1670–1682 Prince Rupert of the Rhine
2. 1683–1685 James Stuart, Duke of York – resigned as governor to become King James II of England and Ireland and VII of Scotland.
3. 1685–1692 John Churchill, Earl of Marlborough
4. 1692–1696 Sir Stephen Evance
5. 1696–1700 Sir William Trumbull
6. 1700–1712 Sir Stephen Evance
7. 1712–1743 Sir Bibye Lake
8. 1744–1746 Benjamin Pitt
9. 1746–1750 Thomas Knapp
10. 1750–1760 Sir Atwell Lake
11. 1760–1770 Sir William Baker
12. 1770–1782 Sir Bibye Lake Jr.
13. 1782–1799 Samuel Wegg
14. 1799–1807 Sir James Winter Lake
15. 1807–1812 William Mainwaring
16. 1812–1822 Joseph Berens
17. 1822–1852 Sir John Henry Pelly in 1826, Simpson becomes governor of the Canadian region.
18. 1852–1856 Andrew Wedderburn Colvile
19. 1856–1858 John Shepherd
20. 1858–1863 Henry Hulse Berens
21. 1863–1868 Sir Edmund Walker Head
22. 1868–1869 John Wodehouse, 1st Earl of Kimberley
23. 1869–1874 Sir Stafford Henry Northcote
24. 1874–1880 George Joachim Goschen
25. 1880–1889 Eden Colvile
26. 1889–1914 Donald Alexander Smith
27. 1914–1915 Sir Thomas Skinner
28. 1916–1925 Sir Robert Molesworth Kindersley
29. 1925–1931 Charles Vincent Sale
30. 1931–1952 Sir Patrick Ashley Cooper – first governor to visit HBC operations in Canada.
31. 1952–1965 William "Tony" Keswick
32. 1965–1970 Derick Heathcoat-Amory
33. 1970–1982 George T. Richardson
34. 1982–1994 Donald S. McGiverin
35. 1994–1997 David E. Mitchell
36. 1997–2006 L. Yves Fortier
37. 2006–2008 Jerry Zucker
38. 2008 Anita Zucker – first female governor.
39. 2008–2025 Richard Baker

== Miscellany ==
=== HBC explorers, builders, and associates ===
- James Knight (c. 1640 – c. 1721) was a director of Hudson's Bay Company and an explorer who died in an expedition to the Northwest Passage.
- Henry Kelsey (c. 1667 – 1 November 1724), a.k.a. the Boy Kelsey, was an English fur trader, explorer, and sailor who played an important role in establishing Hudson's Bay Company in Canada. In 1690, Henry Kelsey embarked on a 2-year exploration journey that made him the first white man to see buffalo.
- Thanadelthur (c. 1697 – 5 February 1717) was a woman of the Chipewyan nation who was a guide and interpreter for Hudson's Bay Company.
- Samuel Hearne (1745–92) was an English explorer, fur-trader, author, and naturalist. In 1774, Hearne built Cumberland House for the Hudson's Bay Company, its first interior trading post and the first permanent settlement in present Saskatchewan.
- David Thompson (30 April 1770 – 10 February 1857) was a British-Canadian fur trader that worked for both the Hudson's Bay Company and the North West Trading Company. He is best known for his extensive explorations and map-making activities. He mapped almost half of North America between the 46th and 60th parallels, from the St Lawrence and Great Lakes all the way to the Pacific.
- Thomas Douglas, Lord Selkirk (20 June 1771 – 8 April 1820) was a Scottish peer and philanthropist who, as HBC's majority shareholder, arranged to purchase land at Red River to establish a colony for dispossessed Scottish immigrants.
- Isobel Gunn or Isabella Gunn (c. 1780 – 7 November 1861), also known as John Fubbister or Mary Fubbister, was a Scottish labourer employed by Hudson's Bay Company (HBC), noted for having passed herself as a man, thereby becoming the first European woman to travel to Rupert's Land, now part of Western Canada.
- George Simpson (1787 – 7 September 1860) was the Canadian governor of Hudson's Bay Company during the period of its greatest power, a period which began in 1821 following the company's merger with the North West Trading Company.
- John McLean (c. 1799 – 8 September 1890), a Scoto-Canadian trapper and trader who successfully crossed the entire Labrador Peninsula, opening up an overland route between Fort Smith on Lake Melville and Fort Chimo on Ungava Bay; first European to discover Churchill Falls on the Churchill River.
- Donald Smith, 1st Baron Strathcona and Mount Royal (6 August 1820 – 21 January 1914), at various times Chief Factor of the Labrador district, Commissioner of the Montreal district, and President of the Council of the Northern Department, who pacified Louis Riel during the Red River Rebellion of 1870, thus enabling the transfer of Rupert's Land from the HBC to the fledgling government of Canada. Later, he became Governor of the HBC.
- Dr. John Rae (Inuktitut Aglooka ᐊᒡᓘᑲ English: "long strider") (30 September 1813 – 22 July 1893) was a Scottish doctor who explored Northern Canada, surveyed parts of the Northwest Passage and reported the fate of the Franklin Expedition.
- William Keswick (15 April 1834 – 9 March 1912) and grandson Sir William Johnstone Keswick (1903–90) served at HBC; the former as a director and later as governor from 1952 to 1965. The Keswick family are the Scottish business dynasty that controls Hong Kong-based Jardine Matheson, one of the original British trading houses or Hongs in British Hong Kong.

=== HBC sternwheelers and steamships ===
- Beaver (1835–74)
- Otter (1852–95)
- Anson Northup (1859–60)
- Caledonia (1891–98) – She ran aground on rocks at Port Simpson during a storm and her hull was destroyed. Her engines were put into the Caledonia 2
- Caledonia (2) (1898–1909) – Her machinery was from the Caledonia 1
- Mount Royal (1902–07)
- Princess Louise (1878–83)
- Strathcona (1900)
- Port Simpson (1907–12)
- Hazelton (1907–12)
- Distributor (1920–48)

=== Rivals ===
The HBC is the only European trading company to have survived. It outlived all its rivals.

Years	Company	Fate
1551–1917	Muscovy Company	Taken over by Soviet Russia and now operates as charity.
1581–1825	Levant Company	Dissolved
1600–1874	British East India Company	Dissolved
1602–1800	Dutch East India Company	Went bankrupt and assets taken over by Dutch government
1621–1791	Dutch West India Company	Bought by the Dutch government
1672–1752	Royal African Company	Replaced by the African Company of Merchants, which folded in 1821.
1711–1850s	South Sea Company	Abolished by bankruptcy and the Louisiana Purchase
1779–1821	North West Company	Merged with the HBC
1799–1867	Russian-American Company	Folded with the sale of Russian America to the US and commercial assets in North America sold to Hutchinson, Kohl & Company (now as the Alaska Commercial Company)
1808–1842	American Fur Company	Folded

== See also ==
- Beaver hat
- British colonization of the Americas
- Frontier (2016 TV series)
- Home Outfitters
- Hudson's Bay Company vessels
- Hudson's Bay point blanket
- Hudson's Bay tokens
- James Douglas (governor)
- List of department stores by country § Canada
- List of Hudson's Bay Company trading posts
- List of trading companies
- New Caledonia (Canada)
- North-West Rebellion
- The Romance of the Far Fur Country
- Coat of arms of the Hudson's Bay Company
- Flag of the Hudson's Bay Company
- Voyageurs

== Bibliography ==
- Galbraith, John S. (1957). Hudson's Bay Company As an Imperial Factor 1821–1869. Berkeley and Los Angeles: University of California Press. OCLC 1654182.
- Mackie, Richard Somerset (1998). Trading beyond the mountains : the British fur trade on the Pacific; 1793–1843 (Repr ed.). Vancouver: UBC Press. ISBN 978-0-7748-0613-8.
- Newman, Peter C. (1985). Company of Adventurers. Vol. I. Markham, Ontario: Viking, Penguin Books of Canada. ISBN 978-0-6708-0379-8.
- Newman, Peter C. (1986). Company of Adventurers (New ed.). Markham, Ont.: Penguin Books Canada. ISBN 978-0140067200.
- Newman, Peter C. (1987). Caesars of the Wilderness: Company of Adventurers. Vol. II. Markham, Ontario: Viking, Penguin Books of Canada. ISBN 978-0-6708-0967-7.
- Newman, Peter C. (1988). Caesars of the wilderness. Markham, Ont.: Penguin. ISBN 978-0140086300.
- Rich, E. E. (1958). The History of the Hudson's Bay Company, 1670 – 1870. Vol. I. London: Hudson's Bay Record Society. OCLC 367974.
- Voorhis, Ernest (1930). Historic forts and trading posts of the French régime and of the English fur trading companies. Ottawa: Canadian Department of the Interior. doi:10.14288/1.0375744.
