= NRDC Equity Partners =

American private investment firm

NRDC Equity Partners, LLC
- Company type: Private
- Industry: Private equity
- Founded: 2005; 21 years ago
- Founders: Richard A. Baker; Robert C. Baker; William L. Mack; Lee S. Neibart
- Headquarters: New York City, New York, U.S.
- Key people: Richard A. Baker (Founding Partner)
- Website: nrdcequity.com

NRDC Equity Partners (NRDC) is an American private investment firm focused on retail, real estate, and consumer branded businesses.

== History ==
NRDC was founded in 2005 by Robert C. Baker, owner of National Realty & Development Corp; and William L. Mack and Lee S. Neibart, partners of AREA Property Partners.

NRDC has completed five transactions since 2005, totaling almost $5 billion in enterprise values and has invested approximately $1.5 billion of equity for its transactions. NRDC targets transactions ranging from $250 million to $5 billion of enterprise value, requiring total equity investments of $50 million to $1.5 billion.

== Portfolio ==
=== Current ===
NRDC's current portfolio includes Retail Opportunity Investments Corporation (ROIC). NRDC formed its real estate investment trust portfolio company, ROIC, through a public equity raise of $414 million completed in October 2009. ROIC focuses on acquiring and growing high quality shopping centers. It has invested over $200 million and has completed/announced 14 transactions as of September 2010.

=== Former ===
HBC was a holding company that owned and managed over 57,000,000 square feet (5,300,000 m^{2}) of retail properties located in Canada and the U.S. It operated Hudson's Bay and Zellers department stores across Canada. Home Outfitters, another subsidiary, operated 69 kitchen, bath, and bed superstores across Canada until closing in 2019.

Saks Global operates various department stores and outlet stores in the U.S. including Bergdorf Goodman, Neiman Marcus, Neiman Marcus Last Call, Saks Fifth Avenue and Saks Off 5th. Although a creation of Richard Baker, he is no longer with this company due to its filling of Chapter 11 bankruptcy in early 2026.

NRDC owned Lord & Taylor, operating 50 department stores and four outlet centers located in the U.S. NRDC directly owned the chain from 2006 to 2008, and then through Hudson's Bay Trading from 2008 to 2012 and HBC from 2012 to 2019. The sale of Lord & Taylor to Le Tote Inc. by HBC was announced in August 2019.

From 2015 to 2019 NRDC owned Germany's largest department store chain, Galeria Kaufhof. On April 9, 2024, it was announced that NRDC intends to once again acquire the department store chain which had become known as Galeria Karstadt Kaufhof from the insolvent Signa Holding company.

Other companies NRDC owned in the past included Fortunoff, Gilt Groupe (through HBC) and Linens 'n Things (as a joint venture with Apollo Global Management).
