= Wrangel =

Surname

Wrangel or Wrangell is a Germanic surname.

== People ==
Notable people with the surname include:

- Wrangel family, or Wrangell, a Baltic German noble family, including a list of notable family members
- Basil Wrangell (1906–1977), Italian film and television editor and director
- Herman Wrangel (c. 1585–1643), Swedish field-marshal and statesman
- Carl Gustaf Wrangel (1613–1676), Swedish field-marshal and statesman
- Carl Henrik Wrangel (1681–1755), Swedish field marshal
- Ferdinand von Wrangel (1797–1870), Baltic German explorer and admiral, governor of Russian Alaska
- Friedrich Graf von Wrangel (1784–1877), Prussian-field marshal
- Hakon Magne Valdemar Wrangell (1859–1942), Norwegian ship owner and politician
- Hedda Wrangel (1792–1833), Swedish composer
- Herman Wrangel (diplomat) (1857–1934), Swedish diplomat
- Herman Wrangel (1859–1938), lieutenant-general and commander of the Swedish Coastal Artillery
- Margarete von Wrangell (1877–1932), Baltic German agricultural chemist and professor
- Nikolai Yegorovich Wrangel (1847-1920), Baron, fighter against Bolshevism
- Olaf von Wrangel (1928–2009), German politician
- Pyotr Wrangel (1878–1928), major-general in the Imperial Russian Army and military commander in the White movement
- Waldemar von Wrangel (1641–1675), Swedish lieutenant-general
- Wilhelm von Wrangell (1894–1976), Estonian politician

== Places ==
- Wrangell, Alaska, United States
- Mount Wrangell, a volcano in Alaska
- Wrangell Island, Alaska, United States
- Wrangel Island, Chukotka, Russia
