= Le Tote =

Online subscription company renting women's clothes

Le Tote, Inc.
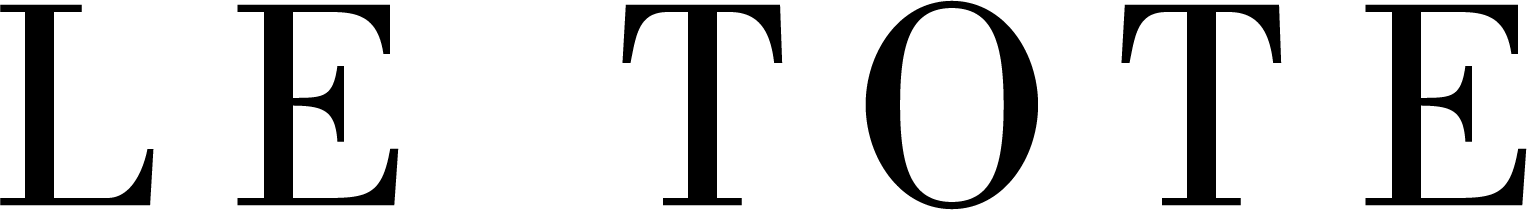
- Type: Private
- Industry: Retail
- Founded: 2012
- Founders: Brett Northart; Rakesh Tondon
- Headquarters: San Francisco, California, U.S.
- Services: Clothing rental
- Owners: Saadia Group

Le Tote was an online women's clothing rental business in the United States which used a subscription box model. It was founded in 2012 by Brett Northart and Rakesh Tondon. In 2019, Le Tote acquired Lord & Taylor.

Le Tote was one of several companies renting women's clothes; competitors included Rent the Runway, The Ms. Collection, Gwynnie Bee, and Armarium. While Rent the Runway focuses more on high-end, "event-driven" clothes, Le Tote mainly rented "everyday wear."

In late August 2019, Le Tote finalized an agreement with Hudson's Bay Company to buy the Lord & Taylor chain for C$99.5 million in cash on closing plus C$33.2 million two years later. HBC was to get a 25% equity stake in Le Tote. The buyer would retain the stores' inventory, with an estimated value of C$284.2 million. The deal required HBC to pay the stores' rent for at least three years, at an estimated C$77 million cash per year.

On August 2, 2020, Le Tote and subsidiary of Le Tote, Lord & Taylor filed for Chapter 11 bankruptcy protection citing the COVID-19 pandemic. They were purchased by the investment firm Saadia Group on October 20, 2020.

Also in 2020, Le Tote sued Urban Outfitters over its clothing rental service, Nuuly. The lawsuit claimed that during negotiations for a proposed acquisition of Le Tote in 2019, Urban Outfitters received confidential business information from Le Tote, and used it in developing Nuuly. A trial in the Eastern District of Pennsylvania resulted in a unanimous jury verdict in favor of Urban Outfitters.

As of March 1, 2024, Women's Wear Daily reported that the Saadia Group had been "effectively shut down. Moreover, legal proceedings involving its asset-based lender mean Saadia no longer has control of the inventory at its warehouses following a default on a $45.3 million loan agreement".

The Le Tote website was taken offline in the spring of 2024, following months of consumer complaints about delayed shipments and difficulty cancelling the service. The final Archive.org snapshot is dated February 19, 2024.
