= Fields (department store) =

Canadian discount department store chain

FIELDS Stores Ltd.
- Type: Discount store chain
- Industry: Retail
- Founded: 1950
- Founder: Joseph Segal; Sonny Wosk
- Headquarters: Delta, British Columbia
- Number of locations: 66 (British Columbia, Alberta, Saskatchewan, Manitoba and the Northwest Territories)
- Key people: Jason McDougall - CEO, Dean Petruk - President & COO
- Products: Fashion, pantry & grocery, footwear, bedding, beauty products, toys, pet products, housewares, mattresses and furniture.
- Owner: FHC Holdings
- Subsidiaries: McFrugalʼs Discount Outlet & Outdoors Store
- Website: fields.ca

Fields Stores Ltd. is a Canadian discount store company owned by FHC Holdings, with 67 locations in British Columbia, Alberta, Saskatchewan, Manitoba, and the Northwest Territories.

== History ==
The first Fields store was established in Vancouver in 1950 by the chain's founders, Joseph Segal and Saul "Sonny" Wosk. From there, Fields grew to eight stores by the time it opened a store at Capilano Mall in North Vancouver in 1968, continuing to expand across British Columbia into the 1970s with the acquisitions of several regional retailers (including several small HBC stores in smaller towns). In 1972, Fields purchased a subsidiary chain of hardware stores called Marshall Wells, and after further expansion into Alberta and Saskatchewan, it acquired majority ownership of the Zellers chain in 1976. Zellers would reverse the takeover a few months later and make Fields and Marshall Wells into its subsidiaries, all of which were partly acquired by the Hudson's Bay Company (HBC) in 1978, and fully owned by 1981. Marshall Wells was sold by HBC in 1985, and Fields was moved from a Zellers subsidiary into a full division of HBC in 1988.

In contrast with the much larger Zellers stores, the Fields division was intended to be a small format, extreme value retail chain for rural and urban Canadian communities. Hudson's Bay Company announced an aggressive expansion strategy for Fields, adding 53 new stores in 2006–2007, with another 35 locations planned for 2008. Over the next several years, HBC planned on opening around 800 new stores across Canada. New locations featured the successful Fields "Mini Mart" concept.

In December 2011, HBC announced that Fields stores would cease operations, beginning February 2012 in Ontario where 26 stores closed. The remaining 141 stores were also announced to close in phases throughout the year ending in the Fall of 2012. But on May 1, 2012, a company called FHC Holdings Ltd. announced that it had purchased 57 Fields stores in British Columbia, Alberta, Saskatchewan, Manitoba and the Northwest Territories from HBC with the intent of keeping those stores open. The company also operates discount closeout stores under the brand McFrugalʼs.
