= Bonnie Brooks =

Canadian department store executive (born 1953)

Bonnie Brooks CM (born 1953) is a Canadian department store executive who is former vice-chairman of Hudson's Bay Company, having formerly served as president and CEO of its department store arm Hudson's Bay.

On July 6, 2016 Hudson's Bay announced via press release that Bonnie Brooks would retire in December 2016.

Brooks was born in 1953 to Gordon and Rose Brooks and was raised in London, Ontario. After university she worked at Dylex's owned Fairweather, then with upscale retailer Holt Renfrew before moving to Hong Kong to work for Lane Crawford as president from 1997 to 2008.

In December 2016, Brooks was named a Member of the Order of Canada.
