= Albert D. Cohen =

Canadian businessman (1914–2011)

Albert Diamond Cohen
- Born: January 20, 1914; Winnipeg, Manitoba, Canada
- Died: November 21, 2011 (aged 97); Winnipeg, Manitoba, Canada
- Occupations: entrepreneur, community builder, philanthropist
- Awards: Order of Canada

Albert Diamond Cohen, OC LLD (January 20, 1914 – November 21, 2011) was a Canadian entrepreneur, community builder, philanthropist, and Officer of the Order of Canada. He was Chairman, Co-President and Co-Chief Executive Officer of Gendis Inc., a Toronto Stock Exchange listed Canadian real estate and investment company headquartered in Winnipeg, Manitoba. At one time, Gendis held a 51% stake in Sony of Canada and owned the SAAN Stores retail chain.

He was the author of several books: The Entrepreneurs: The Story of Gendis Inc...The Triangle of Success: The Gendis/Saan Story...The Story of SAAN...and...I.D.E.A. His latest and last book, published in the fall of 2010, was titled Reminiscences of an Entrepreneur - How Sony came to Canada and then to the World in 1955. His interest and talent for writing stemmed from his close personal friendship with the late British author Ian Fleming.

Cohen was married to Irena Cohen (née Kankova) from 1953 until his death, and they had three children: Anthony, James, and Anna-Lisa. He died at the age of 97 years, 10 months, in Winnipeg, Manitoba.

== Background ==
Cohen came from a poor immigrant family of eight, born in Winnipeg, Manitoba as the son of Alexander and Rose (Diamond) Cohen, and he served with the Royal Canadian Navy from 1942 to 1945.

Albert's five brothers, John C. (Chauncey), Harry B. Cohen, Morley Cohen, Samuel N. Cohen, and Joseph H. Cohen set up a small retail store and, by 1939, the family had scraped together enough monies to create General Distributors Ltd., a wholesale import firm.

=== Sony and the Cohen Brothers ===
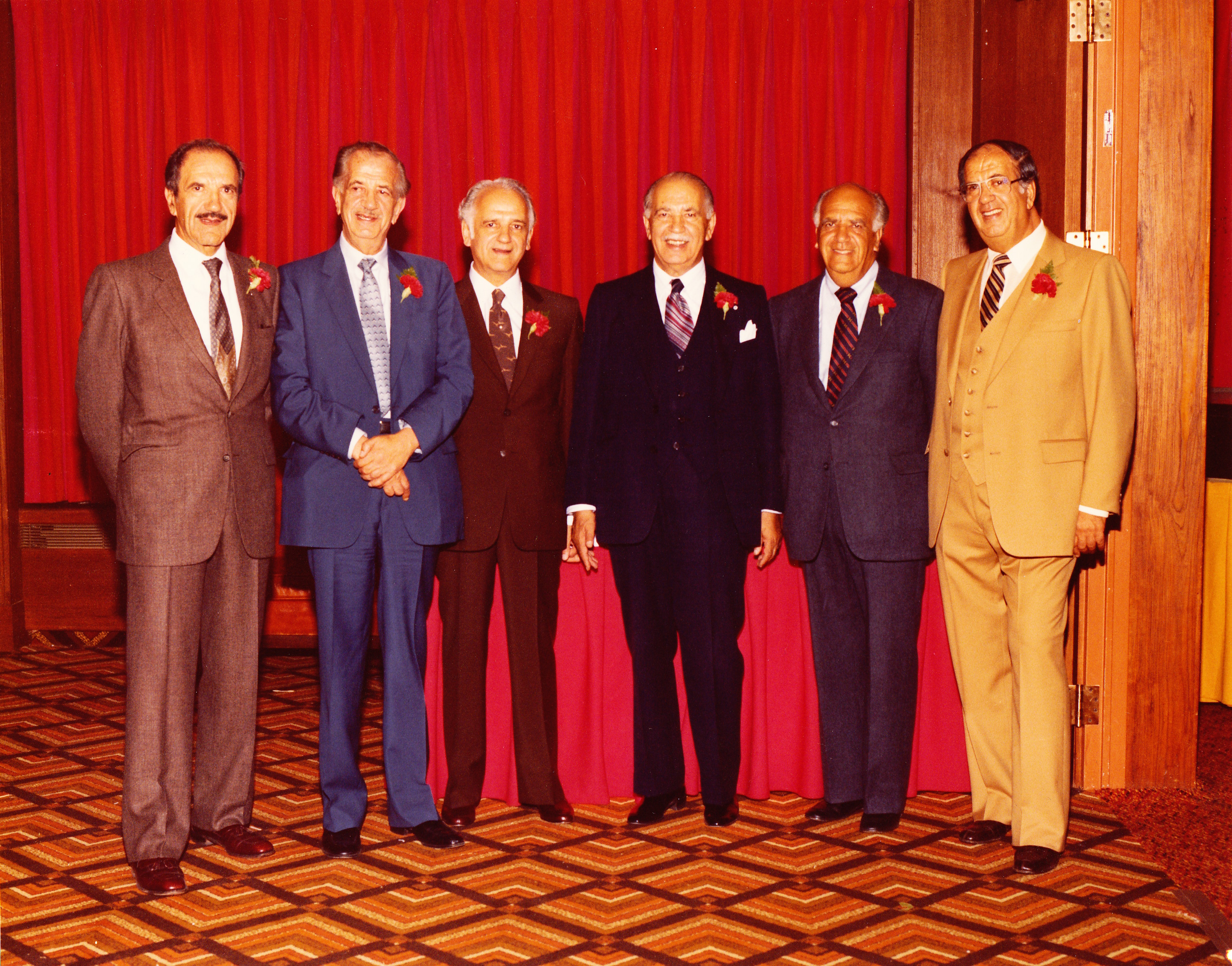
Cohen Brothers of Canada

By 1950, General Distributors sales amounted to $1 million. In 1952, the company obtained exclusive Canadian rights for Paper Mate pens. Albert negotiated the sale of Papermate in Canada to the Gillette (brand) Company of Boston, Massachusetts in 1955 whereby Gendis continued to distribute the Papermate pen in Canada until 1962 when Gillette fully took over. Then, in 1955, Cohen accomplished the feat of landing the Canadian distribution rights to Sony products. Spotting an ad in a Japanese newspaper seeking a distributor for a new portable transistor radio, Cohen met with Sony co-founder, Akio Morita. On the basis of a handshake deal, Cohen cemented a partnership that would last for decades. The Cohen brothers scattered across Canada in order to manage the national business, each brother establishing himself in a major city: Morley (Montreal), John (Toronto), Joe (Vancouver), Harry (Calgary), and both Sam and Albert setting up headquarters (Winnipeg). Gendis' stake in Sony of Canada was sold back to Sony Corporation of Tokyo, Japan in 1995 for $207,000,000. This was a crowning achievement for Albert, the man who launched Sony's first national export business. In recognition of his forty-year association with Sony, Albert received the Sony Lifetime Achievement Award in Tokyo in 2000.

=== SAAN, Metropolitan, real estate, and the Cohen Brothers ===
The six brothers expanded into real estate and retailing. Over the years, they established several hundred SAAN Stores as well as Metropolitan and Greenberg junior department stores in all provinces of Canada. The explosive growth of the SAAN Stores chain was guided by Samuel N. Cohen while Metropolitan's expansion was overseen by Morley Cohen. By 1983, the company was a diversified Canadian conglomerate, renamed Gendis. SAAN Stores was eventually sold in 2004 to a Toronto based investor group and sold again in 2008 to Genuity Capital, owner of The Bargain! Shop discount chain.

At one point, it is said the Cohen brothers owned downtown real estate in almost every major Canadian city. Albert began to accumulate real estate in downtown Winnipeg starting in the early 1960s and Gendis finally sold its city block of property to Manitoba Hydro in 2003 for $16.2 million to allow for construction of the new Manitoba Hydro headquarters which officially opened in September 2009.

=== Oil & gas, and the Cohen Brothers ===
Under Albert's guidance, the six brothers made several investments in the petroleum industry.

== Gendis today ==
Through a variety of investment companies, the Cohen family is the largest shareholder of Gendis Inc., as well as major shareholders of Calgary-based Pembina Pipeline Corporation, (TSX-listed), and privately held Vive Crop Protection, of Toronto, Ontario. James Cohen (Albert's youngest son) is the president and CEO of Gendis Inc.and served as interim president and chief operating officer of SAAN Stores in 2004 during the sale of the retail chain. Today the company is focused on investments in three areas: commercial real estate, energy and the agribusiness sector.

== Philanthropy ==
Cohen was considered to be one of the major community builders/philanthropists in Winnipeg and he was a large contributor to the Royal Winnipeg Ballet, Manitoba Theatre Centre, Winnipeg Symphony Orchestra, Manitoba Opera, and various Winnipeg hospitals.

Several of his notable accomplishments include:

- Founding member, Canada-Japan Business Council
- Former president, Manitoba Theatre Centre (1968–1969, 1970–1971, 1976–1981)
- Former president, Winnipeg Clinic Research Institute (1975–1980)
- Former president, Dr. Paul Thorlakson Research Foundation (1978–1980)
- Past commissioner, Metric Board, Ottawa (1978)

== Awards ==
- Man of the Year, Sales and Advertising Club, Winnipeg (1974)
- Member of the Order of Canada (1983)
- International Distinguished Entrepreneur Award (IDEA), University of Manitoba, [(Asper School of Business)] (1983)
- National Business Book Award, The Entrepreneurs: the Story of Gendis (1986)
- Honorary Doctorate, University of Manitoba (1987)
- The Albert D. Cohen Building at St. John's-Ravenscourt School (1990)
- Order of Excellence Achievement Award, Manitoba Sport Directorate (renamed Sport Manitoba) (1990)
- 125th Anniversary of the Confederation of Canada Medal (1992)
- Officer of the Order of Canada (1994)
- Canadian Business Hall of Fame (1994)
- Albert D. Cohen Management Library at the University of Manitoba's Asper School of Business
- Sony Lifetime Achievement Award (2000)
- Queen Elizabeth II Golden Jubilee Medal (2002)
- Order of the Rising Sun, 3rd Class, Gold Rays with Neck Ribbon (Japan) (2011)
- Manitoba Business Hall of Fame Inductee (2013)

While Cohen has collected an array of awards for business achievements and community service during his life, he was particularly proud of the fact that he holds three Canadian speed skating records in Master 5 Class (over 70 age category), as per the Ottawa Amateur Speedskating Association.

== General references ==
- "Albert D. Cohen fonds, 1914-".
- The Acquisitors, the Canadian Establishment, by Peter C. Newman, 1981, McClelland and Stewart (Toronto, Ont).
- The Entrepreneurs, the Story of Gendis, by Albert D. Cohen, 1985, McClelland and Stewart (Toronto, Ont). OL 2658612M.
- Lumley, Elizabeth (April 2005). Canadian Who's Who, by Elizabeth Lumley, 2005, University of Toronto Free Press (Toronto, Ontario). University of Toronto Press. ISBN 9780802089076.
- "Businessman Cohen, who brought Sony to Canada, dead at 97, November 22, 2011".
- "Albert Cohen Had an Eye for Deals of Import, December 6, 2011". The Globe and Mail. 6 December 2011.
- "JAMBHF- Albert D. Cohen, Vimeo, 2014". 8 October 2014.
- As per Gendis Inc. website: www.gendis.ca
