= Metropolitan Stores =

Canadian variety department store chain

Metropolitan Stores of Canada Ltd.
- Type: Variety store chain
- Industry: Retail
- Founded: 1908 (as F.H. Brewster & Company, first incorporation); May 11, 1920 (as Metropolitan Stores, second incorporation); March 3, 1961 (as Metropolitan Stores of Canada, third incorporation)
- Founder: F.H. Brewster
- Defunct: 1997
- Fate: Filed for bankruptcy in 1997, acquired by SAAN Stores
- Successor: SAAN Stores
- Headquarters: Winnipeg, Manitoba
- Key people: Albert D. Cohen (CEO); Morley M. Cohen; Samuel N. Cohen; Charles F. Cohen
- Products: Clothing, footwear, bedding, furniture, jewelry, beauty products, food and snacks, toys, appliances, housewares, tools, electronics
- Owner: Independent (until 1997)
- Parent: Gendis Inc.
- Subsidiaries: SAAN; Greenberg; Red Apple

Metropolitan Stores of Canada Ltd. (often referred to as Met or Metropolitan) was a Canadian variety department store chain based in Winnipeg, Manitoba.

The company was incorporated in 1908 as F.H. Brewster & Company, renamed Metropolitan Stores Ltd. in 1920 and became a newly-formed Canadian corporation as Metropolitan Stores of Canada Ltd. in 1961. At its peak, Metropolitan was one of the four largest variety chain store organizations in Canada with 180 stores in all provinces and territories and also operated junior department and clothing stores under the SAAN, Greenberg and Red Apple banners. The chain's headquarters was located at 1370 Sony Place in Winnipeg, Manitoba, and its warehouse distribution centre was situated at 3075 Trans-Canada Highway in Pointe-Claire, Quebec. The chain was subsequently acquired by SAAN in 1997.

== History ==
=== 1908–1920s: Early years ===
The chain began in 1908 when F.H. Brewster, the founder, opened his first five-and-dime store eponymously named F.H. Brewster & Company at 483-485 Talbot Street in St. Thomas, Ontario. Other stores were opened under the name of "F.H. Brewster & Company" in London, Ingersoll, Chatham and other Ontario cities. Brewster lost his first two stores in London: one before it even opened when the neighbouring crockery store "Reid's Crystal Hall" collapsed into it during a renovation to the building on July 16, 1907, as two salesgirls were sorting out stock for the grand opening later that week; the other store was lost in a Dundas Street fire only a year or two after operation on the night of November 3, 1911. Brewster's new store, which appeared the following year, was built and designed for the owner Sir George Gibbons by London architects Watt & Blackwell.

On February 1, 1913, Brewster's new three-storey store at 146-148 Colborne Street in Brantford, Ontario, was also damaged by a fire to the extent of $25,000. The fire erupted in the morning when the store was open and employees and customers were inside. The store's large stock of flammable material flashed into a blazing furnace.

The company was incorporated in Canada as Metropolitan Stores Ltd. on May 11, 1920, and commenced business after "Metropolitan 5 to 50¢ Stores Inc." of the United States purchased control of the "Canadian Smallwares Company" chain of seven stores and merged it with four units of the "Variety 5¢ and 10¢ Stores" of Montreal, numbering eleven stores in all. At the close of 1928, Metropolitan Stores was operating a chain of 130 stores from coast to coast in Canada and the United States, with 31 Canadian stores alone located in four provinces: Quebec, Ontario, New Brunswick and Nova Scotia.

On March 30, 1929, the newly renovated and expanded Metropolitan Store and its Canadian head office opened at 136, 138 and 140 Dundas Street in London. The buildings at 136, 138 and 140 Dundas Street were also built by London architects Watt & Blackwell in 1914: 136 and 138 Dundas Street was built for the Metropolitan Store, while 140 Dundas Street was combined and renovated with 136 and 138 Dundas to house the Canadian head office for Metropolitan Stores.

=== 1930s–1970s: Rise and expansion ===
By 1930, Metropolitan Stores Ltd. was operating 52 stores and had assets of $10 million, sales of $7.4 million and a net profit of $423,000. On October 6, 1930, "Metropolitan 5 to 50¢ Stores Inc." sold its Canadian subsidiary to F. & W. Grand-Silver Stores Inc. of the United States and when this latter company went into receivership three years later, H.L. Green Company Inc. (also of the United States) acquired them both on July 26, 1933. Shortly afterwards, the Metropolitan name disappeared in the U.S. but it remained in Canada. In subsequent years, the Metropolitan Store chain prospered and expanded at a conservative rate, operating 85 stores in practically all of the principal cities in Canada between 1933 and 1960.

After 40 years of being controlled by United States interests, H.L. Green Company Inc. signed an agreement on March 3, 1961, for the sale of the operating assets of its wholly owned Canadian subsidiary of Metropolitan Stores Ltd. to investment bankers James Richardson & Sons Ltd. of Winnipeg, Manitoba, for approximately $19 million in cash, which returned the company to 100 per cent Canadian ownership. The agreement brought 86 stores and one warehouse located mainly in Ontario, Quebec and Winnipeg with annual sales in excess of $20 million and an annual profit after taxes of more than $1 million. Following the purchase, James Richardson & Sons transferred the business of Metropolitan Stores Ltd. to a newly formed Canadian corporation that became known as Metropolitan Stores of Canada Ltd.

Two months later on May 15, 1961, Albert D. Cohen, President of the Cohen family-owned real estate and investment company General Distributors Ltd. (headquartered in Winnipeg and whose name was changed to Gendis Inc. in 1983) announced that he and his associates had purchased a major interest in Metropolitan Stores of Canada Ltd. and, under his leadership, plans were underway for substantial expansion and development, including the opening of new Metropolitan Stores in shopping centres across the country. Soon after General Distributors acquired Metropolitan Stores, it closed the London, Ontario executive office and relocated that function to the new executive office and warehouse in Pointe-Claire, Quebec. By 1963, Metropolitan Stores of Canada Ltd. was the fourth-largest variety chain store organization in Canada, behind Woolworth's, Kresge and Zellers, operating 111 stores from coast to coast.

Metropolitan continued to expand directly and through its subsidiaries (Greenberg and SAAN Stores) throughout the 1960s and 1970s, totalling 180 stores in all Canadian provinces, including 64 junior department stores operated by Greenberg and 73 stores operated by SAAN, with 24 Metropolitan stores which opened between 1973 and 1976. Of the 180 stores in the Metropolitan chain, there were 50 in Ontario, 15 in Nova Scotia, 17 in New Brunswick, 35 in Quebec, 8 in Manitoba, 7 in Saskatchewan, 11 in Alberta, 6 in British Columbia, 2 in Prince Edward Island and 29 in Western Canada. By the mid-1970s, General Distributors' portfolio of Metropolitan Stores and its subsidiaries was riding high and annual sales stood at $137 million.

=== 1980s–1997: Closures, bankruptcy and acquisition by SAAN ===
During the mid-to-late 1980s, several Metropolitan stores were either closed or converted into SAAN stores due to the harsh economic climate, as well as intense retail competition in eastern Canada. Metropolitan and its subsidiary Greenberg stores struggled financially in the 1990s as the Canadian retail landscape changed with the 1994 entry of Walmart Canada followed by its acquisition of 122 Woolco stores which exerted significant additional competitive pressure on retail stores.

During the mid-1990s, Gendis Inc. began converting some selected Metropolitan and Greenberg locations to a new department store format called Met Mart as an attempt to compete against Walmart; however, the Met Mart conversion strategy proved to be unsuccessful and was short-lived.

By 1996, cracks began to appear in the Gendis retail empire due to declining sales revenues and their MMG Management Group of Montreal was voluntarily assigned into bankruptcy on February 11, 1997. When Gendis placed into bankruptcy its remaining 169 Metropolitan, Met Mart and Greenberg stores in February 1997, SAAN acquired 89 of these outlets at a cost of $31 million and rebranded them under the SAAN Stores and Red Apple Stores banners.

== Stores ==
=== Retail focus ===
Metropolitan stores were usually free-standing or located in strip malls or shopping malls and ranged in size between 20,000 to 40,000 square feet (1,900 to 3,700 m^{2}). The stores carried household items (batteries, locks, screwdrivers, hammers, saws, wrenches, pliers, wire cutters, nuts, bolts, screws, shovels, pitchforks, hand spades, spades, rakes, watering hoses, sprinklers), sundries, seasonal products, clothing and footwear (men, women, children, infants), food and snacks, jewellery, stationery, crockery, beauty products, furniture, toys (namely dolls, doll clothing including dresses, sleepwear and accessories, model cars, miniature pick-up trucks, container trucks, wheels, rigs and doll play bags), electronics, creative products like needlecrafts, fabrics and Phentex yarn.

=== Slogans and logo ===
Metropolitan logo used from the 1960s–1980s

- "Where your money buys more"
- "Thrifty Canadians find it pays to shop at the Met"
- "Your friendly Met Store"
- "There's always a good reason to shop the Met"
- "At the Met, every day your dollar means more!"

On September 15, 1966, Metropolitan Stores of Canada Ltd. adopted its company logo consisting of a large red "M" which bears a stylized blue maple leaf as its centre containing "MET" lettered in white color.

=== Cafe Met ===
For many years, Metropolitan featured in-store lunch counter-style restaurants known as Cafe Met which were usually located at the back of the stores or, when a store had a second sales floor, they were located either in the basement or upstairs on the first floor. They served a fairly standard menu of hot and cold drinks, hamburgers, hot dogs, fries, and such other sandwiches as grilled cheese, hot turkey and turkey club sandwiches.

=== Subsidiaries ===
- SAAN was a chain of discount stores which began in Winnipeg in 1947. Surplus items from the Canadian Armed Forces were the company's first supply source until its sales grew and more SAAN stores opened. After filing for bankruptcy, SAAN closed its 126 stores nationwide with a going-out-of-business sale in 2008. The chain was purchased out of bankruptcy in August 2008 by Genuity Capital, the owner of The Bargain! Shop chain at that time, and stores reopened as Bargain! Shop locations.
- Greenberg was a small-size discount store chain operated by Gendis and were located in smaller towns. It was mainly a clothing store but also included a restaurant, toys, small appliances, candies and other departments. When Greenberg closed in 1997, many stores were reopened as SAAN.
- Red Apple is a small chain of clearance stores and a former division of SAAN founded in 1989 in Western Canada which offers consumers discount pricing on quality family clothing, clothing basics, housewares, snacks as well as limited grocery items. The Red Apple and SAAN names were purchased when SAAN was acquired by Genuity Capital in August 2008.

=== Presidents ===
- F.H. Brewster (founder; 1908–1920)
- Verne M. Bovie (1921–1926)
- E.W. Livingston (1926–1931)
- Harold L. Green (1931–1950)
- Ralph C. Wallar (1950–1954)
- Joseph H. Unger (1954–1966)
- Samuel N. Cohen (1966–1975)
- Morley M. Cohen (1975–1979)
- William J. Young (1979–1981)
- Charles F. Cohen (1981–1992)
- Ted Johnston (1992–1997)

== Metropolitan Stores incidents ==
On the Christmas evening of December 25, 1930, a blaze erupted from the Artemis Sweets confectionery store and completely demolished the adjoining Metropolitan store located at 146-148 Colborne Street in Brantford, Ontario. The fire was brought under control by the local fire department, with the assistance of one pumper and 17 firemen from the Hamilton department. The damage was estimated at nearly $150,000. Artemis Sweets was not rebuilt but the Metropolitan Store at 146 Colborne Street, was.

On January 7, 1932, the Metropolitan on Dundas Street in London, Ontario was severely damaged in a disastrous fire that began at the T.F. Kingsmill Company department store which eventually spread to adjoining shops, including a dry goods store and a crockery company. The damage caused a loss estimated at $1 million and required a complete rebuilding of the store.

On October 22, 1937, a three-alarm fire that raged through three buildings in the downtown area of Göttingen Street in Halifax, Nova Scotia also destroyed the three-storey wooden structure of the Metropolitan, as well as water and smoke damage to adjacent firms. The local fire department battled the blaze for four hours and damages were estimated at $100,000.

On September 10, 1938, a fire damaged the top floors of the three-storey Metropolitan store building at 101st Street and 101A Avenue in Edmonton, Alberta. The building, valued at approximately $100,000, was gutted the following day on the second and third floors and much of the stock (valued at $250,000) was damaged. Customers and employees were ordered by store officials to vacate the premises as soon as the smoke was first noticed. The building was re-designed and upgraded in 1962. When the Metropolitan Store left the building in the early 1980s, the building was converted into offices and was later demolished in 1990.

On July 31, 1957, a fire which destroyed a whole corner block of stores and second-storey apartments, spread quickly to the adjoining Metropolitan and the Lady Ann Dress Shop at the Treasure Island Mall on Wellington Road in Tillsonburg, Ontario. No one was injured and damages were estimated to be well over $100,000.

On October 25, 1960, a massive gas explosion destroyed the building housing the Metropolitan at 439 Ouellette Avenue in Windsor, Ontario. Ten people were killed and one hundred others were injured. The explosion blew out the building's rear wall and the second floor collapsed, trapping employees and customers, many of whom were senior citizens who had been sitting earlier at the lunch counter. Hundreds of rescuers, many of them volunteers, scrambled through the rubble searching for the wounded and the dead. The furnace was being changed from coal to gas. The cause of the explosion was a broken gas line in the basement. The main floor blew out, allowing the upper two floors to collapse into the space. The plumbing contractor was found at fault for not using proper procedures. The building was eventually demolished. The 50th anniversary of the event was commemorated by the Windsor Star on October 23, 2010, and was also featured on History Television's Disasters of the Century.

On July 26, 1976, a fire destroyed the Metropolitan at the corner of Royal Road and Saskatchewan Avenue in Portage la Prairie, Manitoba. The local Fire Chief was full of praise for his staff's work, as well as the volunteers who helped keep the fire from spreading to adjacent business locations. Shortly thereafter, the Metropolitan Store was rebuilt and reopened for business and the new store featured modern fixtures and a larger lunch counter.

On December 6, 1979, improper furnace conditions at the Metropolitan on Rideau Street in downtown Ottawa, Ontario caused toxic gases to accumulate to levels that sent 21 employees to the hospital. An investigation found that three small doors on a furnace air unit were propped open, allowing carbon monoxide and other poisonous gases to pollute air in the store's main sales area. Ottawa Gas Company tests confirmed that carbon monoxide was the cause of the symptoms the victims suffered and that a buildup of carbon in the furnace and in the chimney were a contributing factor. A work crew cleaned out the furnace and made repairs to the chimney and the store re-opened later that same evening at 6:00 p.m.

== See also ==
- List of Canadian department stores
- SAAN
