= Walter P. Zeller =

Canadian businessman (1890-1957)

Walter Philip Zeller
- Born: October 21, 1890 near Berlin, Ontario, Canada
- Died: August 25, 1957 (aged 66)
- Burial place: Mount Royal Cemetery, Montreal, Quebec
- Known for: Founder of Zellers

Walter Philip Zeller (October 21, 1890 – August 25, 1957) was a Canadian businessman and founder of discount retail chain Zellers.

Zeller was born October 21, 1890, near the city of Kitchener, Ontario (then Berlin). His great-grandfather settled in Breslau, Ontario after arriving from Germany.

Zeller began his career with the F. W. Woolworth Company, where he started as a delivery boy in 1912. He left after two years to move to the U.S. and work for S. S. Kresge Co. and later Metropolitan Stores.

In 1928, he returned to Canada and started his own chain of stores, with locations in London, Guelph, St. Catharines and Fort William (Thunder Bay). They were acquired by Schulte-United. After Schulte went bankrupt during the Great Depression, Zeller bought the company's Canadian stores and launched Zeller's in 1931. The store's name was eventually changed to "Zellers" to make it bilingual. Zellers was originally concentrated in southern Ontario but gradually expanded across the country. The business was headquartered in Montreal, Quebec. In 1952, American retailer W.T. Grant Company became the largest shareholder of the company, eventually owning a 51% controlling share.

Zeller retired in 1956 and died in 1957. He is buried in Montreal, at Mount Royal Cemetery in the Lilac Knoll section.

Zeller married Nettie Lewis in 1912 and had two sons, C. Edward and Warren Robert. Warren died in 1944 as a flying officer with the RCAF and Edward served with the Royal Canadian Artillery as a lieutenant.
