= I'd Be Proud to Be the Mother of a Soldier =

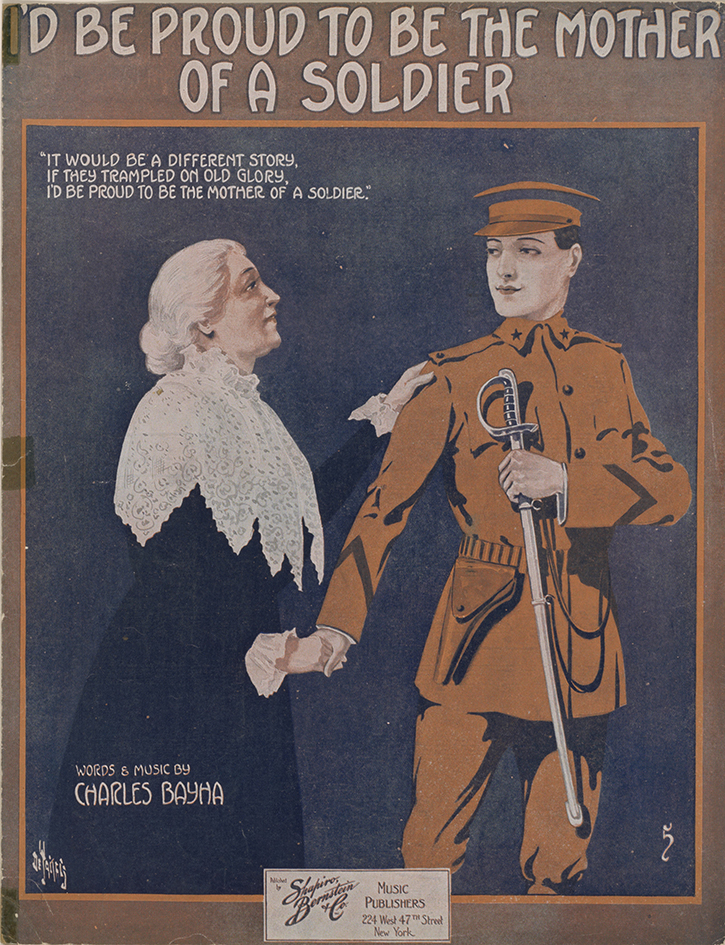
- Sheet Music cover

Song
- Language: English
- Published: 1915
- Songwriter(s): Charles A. Bayha

I’d be proud to be the Mother of a Soldier is a World War I song released in 1915. It was published by Shapiro, Bernstein & Co. in New York, New York.

This song, written and composed by Charles A. Bayha, uses what in later years became the classic image of the mother volunteering her son for military service.

The sheet music cover reads, "It would be a different story, if they trampled on old glory, I'd be proud to be the mother of a soldier."

The sheet music can be found at the Pritzker Military Museum and Library, as well as The University of Maine.
