= Walter Zeller =

Walter Zeller may refer to:

- Walter P. Zeller (1890–1957), Canadian businessman and founder of discount retail chain Zellers
- Walter Zeller (motorcyclist) (1928–1995), former Grand Prix motorcycle road racer from Germany
