= Shapiro, Bernstein and Co. v. H.L. Green Co. =

American legal case

- Court: United States Court of Appeals for the Second Circuit
- Full case name: Shapiro, Bernstein and Co. v. H.L. Green Co.
- Argued: March 27, 1963
- Decided: April 15, 1963
- Citations: 316 F.2d 304; 137 U.S.P.Q. 275

Court membership
- Judges sitting: Sterry R. Waterman, Irving Kaufman, Edward Weinfeld (S.D.N.Y.)

Case opinions
- Majority: Kaufman, joined by a unanimous court

Laws applied
- Copyright Act, 17 U.S.C. § 101(e)

Shapiro, Bernstein and Co. v. H.L. Green Co., 316 F.2d 304 (2d Cir. 1963), was a landmark case dealing with secondary liability (vicarious liability) for copyright infringement. The law in question was Section 101(e) of the Copyright Act.

== Underlying action ==
The trial court was the United States District Court for the Southern District of New York, and the judge was Thomas F. Murphy.

The plaintiff in the underlying action was the proprietor of certain copyrights (Shapiro, Bernstein and Co.), and it sued two defendants: a record concessionaire (Jalen Amusement Company, Inc.), which allegedly infringed Shapiro's copyrights by selling bootleg copies, and the chain store in which the record concessionaire was based (H. L. Green Company) which allegedly engaged in contributory infringement of those copyrights by virtue of its business relationship with the record concessionaire. The lower court concluded, based on factual findings as to H.L. Green's business relationship with Jalen, that as a matter of law no contributory infringement could have occurred, and dismissed the complaint as to Green. Shapiro appealed this legal conclusion. (The lower court found as a matter of fact that Jalen did in fact infringe, and Jalen declined to appeal.)

== Holding ==
The Court of Appeals, Kaufman, Circuit Judge, held that store owner was liable for unauthorized sale of ‘bootleg’ records infringing on plaintiffs' copyrights. He based this conclusion on the observation that the owner retained ultimate right of supervision over conduct of record concession and concessionaire's employees and reserved for itself a proportionate share of gross receipts from concessionaire's sale of phonograph records. Knowledge was not relevant.
