= Charles A. Bayha =

American songwriter

Charles Anthony Bayha (May 12, 1891 – February 28, 1957) was an American lyricist and composer during World War I.

== Biography ==
Bayha was born on May 12, 1891, in Brooklyn, New York City. He married Emma Mary Howard (1895–?) on June 30, 1919, in Barnesville, Ohio. They had a son, Jack Elliott Bayha (1920–1996). Charles joined ASCAP in 1920. He died on February 28, 1957, in Manhattan, New York City. He was buried on March 4, 1957, in Rosedale and Rosehill Cemetery in Linden, New Jersey.

== Compositions ==
Bayha wrote and composed several wartime songs including, Every Girlie Loves a Soldier, I'd Be Proud to Be the Mother of a Soldier, If We Had a Million More Like Teddy, I'm In the Army Now, Let's Be Ready, That's the Spirit of '76, Neal of the Navy, Sail on, Victorious, Unseen, Sail!, and Since the Boys Came Home from France.
