= Richard A. Baker (businessman) =

American business executive (born 1965)

- Born: Richard Alan Baker; November 27, 1965 (age 60); New York City, U.S.
- Education: Cornell University (B.S.)
- Occupation: Business executive
- Known for: Co-founder of NRDC Equity Partners
- Spouse: Lisa Marie Burrell
- Children: 3

Richard Alan Baker (born November 27, 1965) is an American business executive. He is the owner of National Realty and Development Corp. (NRDC), a US-based private real estate development and investment company. He previously served as the chairman of the board of directors for Retail Opportunity Investments Corp. (ROIC). He previously held various positions as owner of Hudson's Bay Company and was also the Executive Chairman of Saks Global, which includes luxury retail brands Saks Fifth Avenue, Neiman Marcus, Bergdorf Goodman and Saks OFF 5TH.

== Early life and education ==
Baker grew up in Greenwich, Connecticut, the son of Betty Lou (née Grossman) and Robert C. Baker, the founder of NRDC. He has one brother, Nelson, and two sisters, Lauren and Ashley. Baker is of Jewish descent. As a teenager, Baker spent many of his weekends shadowing his father, a real estate developer, during visits to shopping centers throughout the Northeastern United States.

At 15, Baker attended the École de Cuisine La Varenne, a cooking school in Paris; he subsequently started a catering business that employed classmates and catered parties in his hometown. He graduated from the Brunswick School and received a Bachelor of Science in Hotel Management from Cornell University in 1988.

== Career ==
He began his career working for his father, a mall developer and principal of National Realty & Development Corp, after graduating from the Cornell University School of Hotel Administration. In 2006, he purchased Lord & Taylor, America's longest continually operating department store from Federated Department Stores, for $1.2 billion, borrowing $1 billion to finance the deal. In 2017, Baker sold the Lord & Taylor flagship building on Fifth Avenue for $850 million to WeWork. Two years later, he sold the Lord & Taylor operating company for $100 million to Le Tote.

In 2008, Baker led NRDC's purchase of the Toronto-based Hudson's Bay Company (HBC), North America's oldest company (established by English royal charter in 1670), Baker becoming its Governor (company chairman). In 2011, Baker sold the stores (but not the brand) of Canadian based chain Zellers to Target for US$1.8-billion.

In November 2012, HBC was publicly listed on the Toronto Stock Exchange, at which time Baker assumed the role of interim CEO until the appointment of Helena Foulkes as CEO in 2018.

In 2013, Baker led the acquisition by Hudson Bay Company of Saks Fifth Avenue and Saks Off 5th through the $2.9 billion purchase of its parent company, Saks Inc.

Baker has served on the board of trustees of Cornell University since 2014. He also sits on the advisory boards of the Cornell University School of Hotel Management and the Baker Program in Real Estate–a two-year real estate graduate program at Cornell University.

In 2015, as HBC's chairman, Baker orchestrated the acquisition of Germany's largest department store chain, Galeria Kaufhof. In 2018, HBC sold part of its German real estate assets to Signa Holding, the owner of the German department store Karstadt, for €411 million as the two companies entered into a merger agreement valued at €3.25 billion. The following year, HBC sold its remaining stake in the merger for $1.5 billion to Signa Group, thus exiting the European market. On April 9, 2024 it was announced that his investment company NRDC intends to once again acquire the department store chain which had become known as Galeria Karstadt Kaufhof from the insolvent Signa Holding company.

In March 2020, Baker led a group of shareholders to take HBC private, at which time he resumed the role of CEO in addition to his existing role as Executive Chairman.

In October of that year, HBC created a dedicated investment and real estate business, HBC Properties and Investments, responsible for the operation of 40 million square feet of leasable area throughout North America.

In August 2021, Baker led the expansion of Hudson's Bay department stores with the launch of the company's online marketplace, TheBay.com.

Baker previously served as the non-executive chairman of the Retail Opportunity Investments Corporation, a real estate investment trust that was acquired by Blackstone Real Estate for $4 billion in 2025.

In 2024, Saks Global was spun off from HBC, with Baker as chairman of both, following Saks Global's acquisition of Neiman Marcus Group for $2.7B. In March 2025, HBC entered liquidation proceedings, with the potential to close all of the 80 Hudson's Bay stores in Canada. Saks Global filed for chapter 11 bankruptcy after its acquisition of Neiman Marcus.

== Philanthropy ==
Baker and his wife contributed $11 million to Cornell's Program in Real Estate, now the Baker Program in Real Estate in 2012.

According to HBC, as Chairman of the Hudson's Bay Foundation, Baker has overseen the disbursement of more than CA$100 million in cash and in-kind donations to Canadian charities, to include the Canadian Olympic Foundation, the Paralympic Foundation of Canada, The Centre for Addiction and Mental Health, and the Children's Aid Foundation of Canada.

In 2013, under Baker's leadership, the Hudson's Bay Company announced that it had directed $200,000 to the American Red Cross and Canadian Red Cross in support of Typhoon Haiyan relief efforts in the Philippines. Following the Western Africa Ebola Outbreak in 2014, the Hudson's Bay Company Foundation again partnered with the Canadian Red Cross to match $50,000 in donations to support emergency response operations in affected countries and combat the spread of the virus. In 2021, the Foundation announced the launch of the Hudson's Bay Charter for Change initiative to accelerate racial equity in Canada with a $30 million gift spread over 10 years. In 2022, Baker announced the donation of an historic building in downtown Winnipeg by HBC to the First Nations people.

Baker also is President of the Saks Fifth Avenue Foundation. As of October 2022, the Foundation announced that it had donated over $5.8 million to various US mental health initiatives.

== Personal life ==
He is married to Lisa Marie Burrell. They have three children.
