= Zellers =

Canadian department store chain originally founded in 1928.

- Type: Division
- Industry: Discount retail store
- Founded: 1931; 95 years ago
- Founder: Walter P. Zeller
- Fate: Original chain wound down in 2013 after HBC sold 220 leases to Target Canada; brand relaunched in 2025 by INC Group of Companies.
- Headquarters: Toronto (North York), Ontario, Canada
- Number of locations: 3 (Note: 350 in 1999)
- Products: Clothing, grocery, footwear, bedding, furniture, toys, housewares, stationery
- Parent: HBC 1978–2025; Les Ailes de la Mode 2025–present
- Website: zellers.ca

Zellers is a Canadian discount retail store, currently operating three locations in Canada. Originally founded by Walter P. Zeller in 1928, the chain was quickly sold to Schulte-United Ltd, which went bankrupt in early 1931 during the Great Depression. Zeller repurchased 14 Zellers stores and re-launched the company on August 4, 1931. Through subsequent mergers and acquisitions, Zellers grew to over 250 stores before being acquired by the Hudson's Bay Company (HBC) in 1978, eventually peaking at 350 locations in 1999. By the late 2000s, fierce competition and declining sales caused the chain to lose significant market share.

In January 2011, HBC announced that it would sell the lease agreements for up to 220 Zellers stores to the US chain Target. While HBC initially retained 64 Zellers locations, it announced in July 2012 that all of them would be closed by March 31, 2013. When the chain ceased, HBC converted three former stores into Zellers-branded liquidation outlets for Hudson's Bay stores, however they all had closed by January 2020.

In 2023, the Zellers brand was formally reintroduced as a store-within-a-store concept inside Hudson's Bay department stores; however, in 2025 HBC filed for bankruptcy and closed all Hudson's Bay stores. On August 28, 2025, it was announced that Zellers would be relaunched again, this time under new ownership of Les Ailes de la Mode (part of the INC Group), with the first location opening in a former Hudson's Bay store at Londonderry Mall in Edmonton. The chain was re-launched on October 30, 2025, and expanded into Ontario in June 2026, with plans to open several stores across Ontario heading into 2027.

== History ==
On Saturday, August 4, 1928, Zellers Ltd. was first established in London, Ontario. Walter P. Zeller, its founder, opened his new store and head office at 176 Dundas Street in London after working for years for Metropolitan Stores, F. W. Woolworth Company and Kresge's. The plan at the start was to have stores opened in London, St. Catharines, Niagara Falls, Fort William (part of modern-day Thunder Bay) and Saint John, New Brunswick as part of an effort to establish a Canada-wide chain of department stores. The London store had a street frontage of 53 feet (16 m) and a depth of 137 feet (42 m). It had a total of 7,000 square feet (650 m^{2}) of space on the ground floor with 2,000 square feet (190 m^{2}) of counter space spread out around the store. Sixty women were hired for the opening day working in 21 different departments. Within months, Zellers was doing such good business that they were bought out by the American firm Schulte-United Ltd, but within two years, the rebranded stores went bankrupt.

=== 1930s–1960s: Early years, partnership with W.T. Grant ===
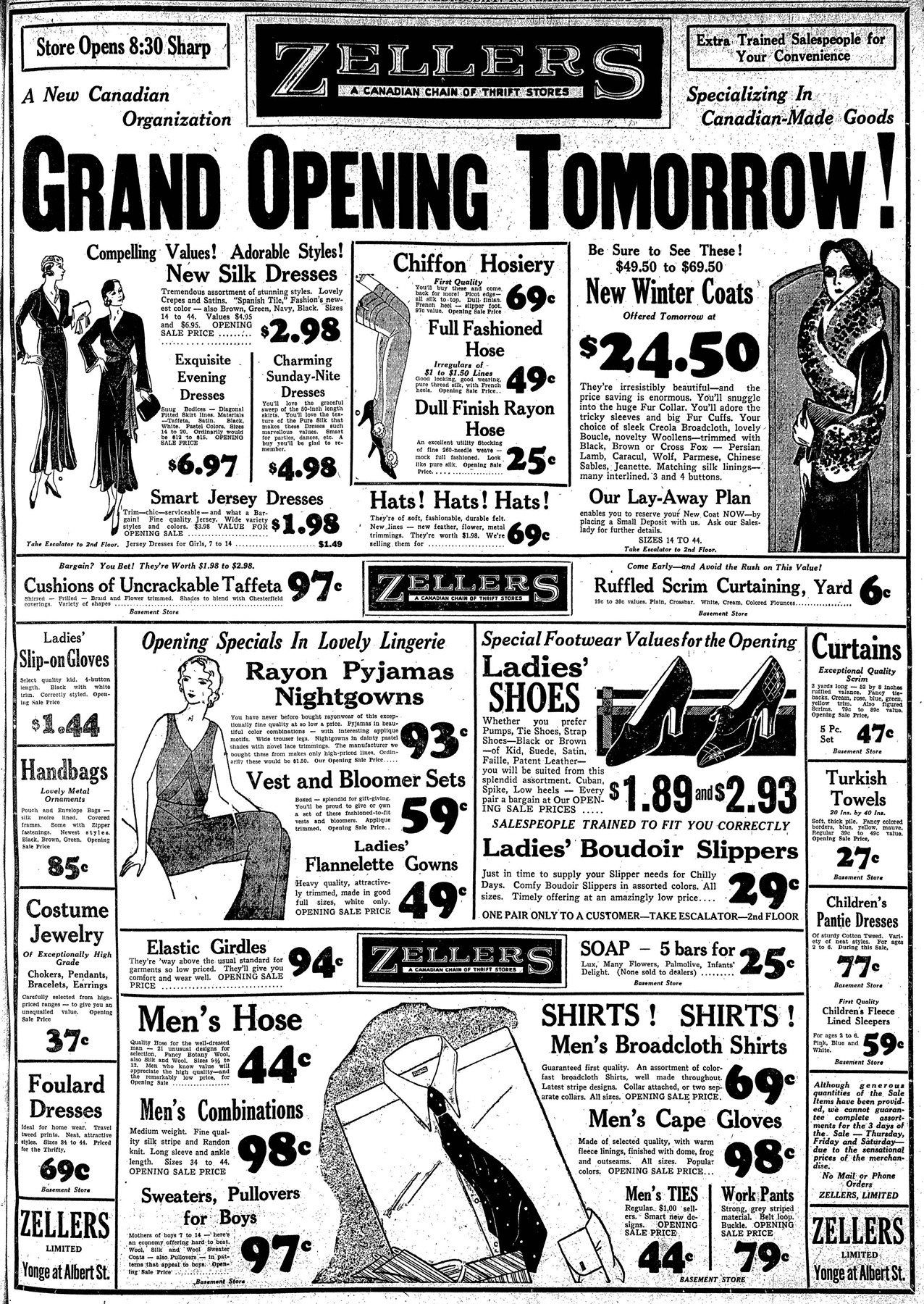
Zellers advertisement in the Toronto Star for its 1931 grand opening in Toronto. The announced location later became part of the Toronto Eaton Centre in 1977.

Zeller promptly bought fourteen Canadian locations of the failed Schulte-United chain, all in Southern Ontario, and relaunched Zellers in late 1931 as a store for thrifty Canadians. One of the locations was the original Zellers at 176 Dundas Street in London, which would remain operating until the late 1980s. Almost immediately, Zellers initiated an aggressive expansion strategy. Within 25 years, Zellers operated 60 stores and employed 3,000 people. In 1952, in a move to expand into Atlantic Canada, it acquired the Federal Stores chain of variety stores, adding more than 12 new Zellers locations.

During this period of expansion, Zellers concluded a deal with W. T. Grant, a similar chain of American mass merchandise department stores. This arrangement allowed W.T. Grant to purchase 10 percent of Zellers shares and eventually a 51 percent ownership in 1959. In exchange, the Grant Company made available to Zellers its experience in merchandising, real estate, store development, and general administration. Zellers employees were sent to Grant stores and head office for training and the two companies made common buying trips to East Asia. In the 1950s, the chain again began opening new locations and in 1956, opened its first self-serve location at the Norgate shopping centre in Saint-Laurent, Quebec. Stores opened in 1960 employed many new innovations, including the first in-store restaurant, the first automotive centre and the first suburban location.

=== 1970s–1980s: Acquisitions of Field and by HBC ===
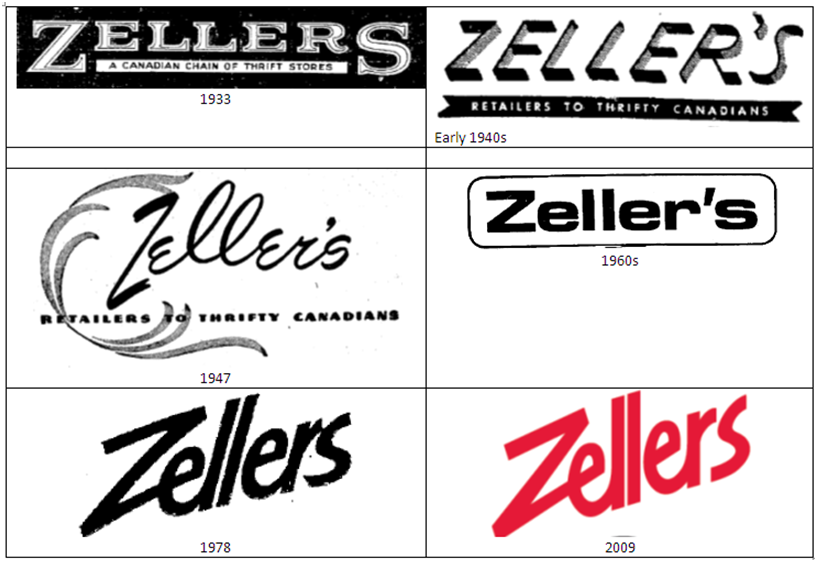
Evolution of the logo over the decades

In 1975, Zellers changed its logo to the current one. By 1976, Zellers had grown to a chain of 155 stores, with annual sales of $407 million.

Although Zellers was prospering, W.T. Grant was facing intense competition in the United States from Kmart, Target, and Walmart, and W.T. Grant was forced to withdraw entirely from its Canadian operations. In 1976, Fields, a clothing retailer based in Vancouver, British Columbia, offered to purchase a 50.1 percent stake in Zellers for $32,675,000. Zellers' shareholders, unhappy with the idea of Zellers becoming a subsidiary of Fields, reversed the takeover and purchased Fields and its hardware store division, Marshall Wells. This sale added 70 Fields stores and 162 franchised Marshall Wells stores to the company. Fields president and founder, Joseph Segal was appointed as president of Zellers.

In June 1978, Zellers presented a bid to acquire 100 percent ownership of the Hudson's Bay Company (HBC). HBC management, recognizing Zellers profitability and the potential to enter a new retail segment, decided to purchase Zellers instead. Zellers and Fields, operating in very different retail segments from HBC, were kept intact and established as separate divisions of the company. HBC acquired full ownership of Zellers and Fields in 1981 and Marshall Wells in 1982. By 1985, HBC had sold Marshall Wells for $20 million because it was not relevant to its department store business.

Counterfeit video games for the Atari 2600 console were manufactured in Taiwan and sold by Zellers in the early 1980s, usually under new names and artwork and occasionally with modified graphics. All games were pirated copies of titles created either by Atari itself or by third-party developers, such as Activision. Zellers was eventually forced by Atari to stop selling these games as Zellers infringed on Atari's copyright. Zellers released 18 games for the Atari 2600 in the early 1980s.

=== 1990s: Further acquisitions ===
In 1990, Hudson's Bay Company acquired the 51 stores of the Towers/Bonimart chain from the Oshawa Group, and converted most of them to Zellers outlets, including its flagship location in the Scarborough district of Toronto. Zellers advertisements at the time featured both the Towers mascot, Sparky, and the Zellers mascot, Zeddy, walking arm in arm, to show the acquisition to the public. During this period, Zellers used the slogan "Where the lowest price is the law."

In 1993, ten former locations of the Woodward's chain were converted into Zellers stores, with almost all of them opening either on September 18 or September 20. This brought the number of Zellers locations to 288 stores.

In 1998, Hudson's Bay Company acquired Kmart's Canadian division, and merged it with the Zellers division to create a larger combined chain under the Zellers name. While some Kmart locations were closed, many sites became full Zellers outlets. Kmart Canada president George Heller remained with HBC, eventually becoming HBC's president and CEO in the mid-2000s.

In 1996, Hudson's Bay Company closed its Zellers head office in Montreal, Quebec and merged it with the Hudson's Bay Company headquarters in downtown Toronto. By 1998, Hudson's Bay Company reestablished its Zellers head office at the former Kmart Canada head office in Brampton, Ontario.

=== 2000s: Decline ===
In Hudson's Bay Company's last year as a publicly traded company, Zellers had 291 stores and lost $107 million on sales of $4.2 billion. On February 28, 2006, Hudson's Bay Company was taken private by South Carolina businessman Jerry Zucker.

Following Zucker's death in 2008, Hudson's Bay Company and its subsidiaries including Zellers came under the ownership of a New York-based private equity firm, NRDC Equity Partners, which was headed by Richard Baker. NRDC also owned the Lord & Taylor upscale specialty retail department store chain in the United States.

Mark Foote was appointed President and CEO of Zellers in 2008, having recently served as president and chief merchandising officer at Loblaw Companies and prior to that was president of Canadian Tire Corp.'s retail division. Foote was credited with stabilizing the chain, though it still continued losing ground against Walmart Canada. Subsequently, NRDC invested heavily in The Bay and managed a turnaround by repositioning it as an upscale, fashion-forward retailer. However, the Zellers chain was still struggling and was seen as a drag on the parent company and its American owner.

=== 2011–2013: Lease acquisitions by Target, liquidation and closure of original chain ===
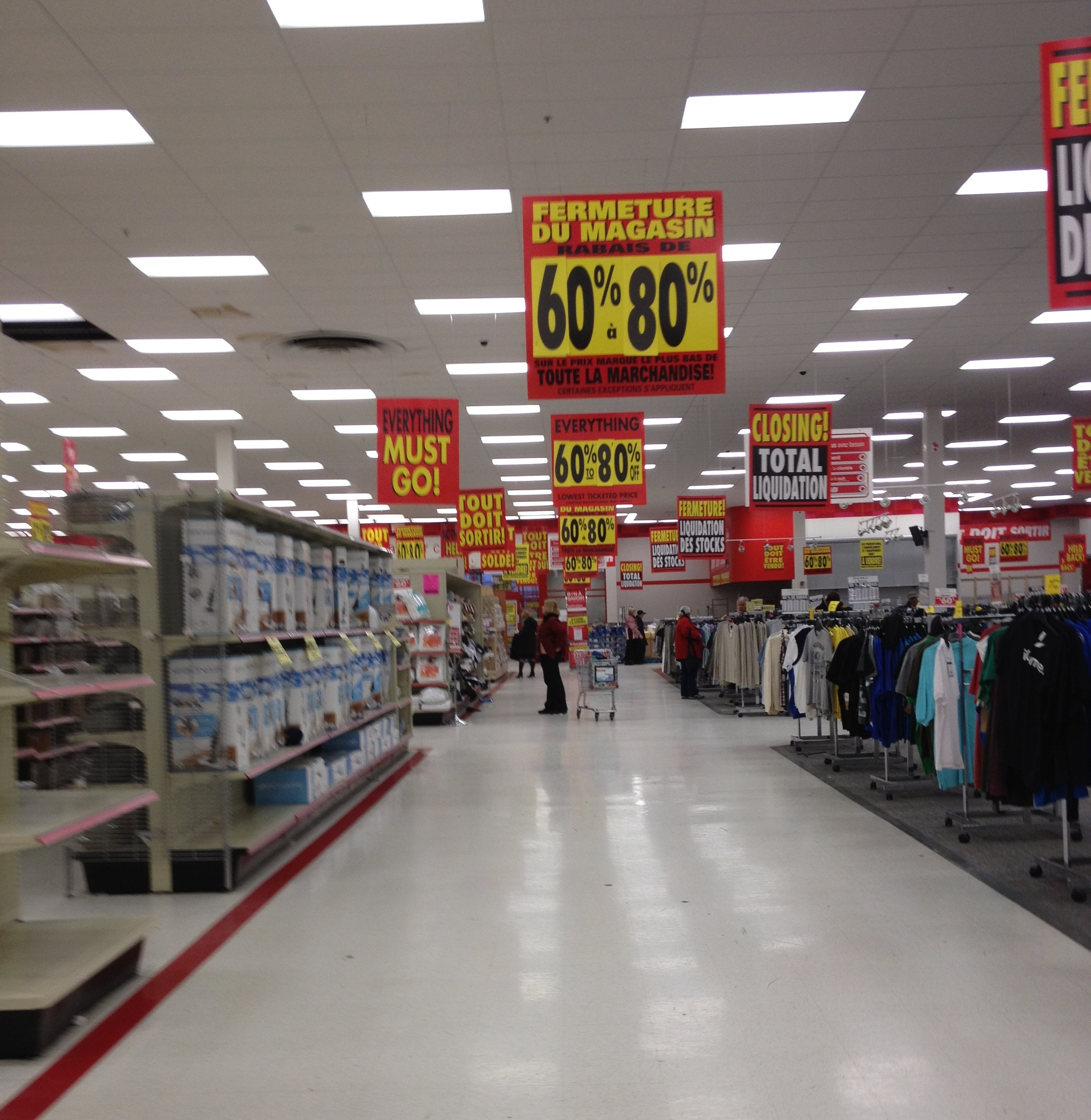
Liquidation closing sale at a Zellers store in Brossard, Quebec

On January 13, 2011, it was announced that American retail chain Target Corporation would purchase the lease agreements of up to 220 Zellers stores for $1.825 billion. Under the agreement, Zellers would sublease the properties and continue to operate them as Zellers locations until January 2012 at the earliest, and at the latest the end of March 2013. At the time of this announcement, Zellers operated 273 stores, well below the 350 stores it had in 1999.

Upon the announcement, it was reported that once the Zellers stores at these locations were closed, Target would renovate 100 to 150 of them to reopen the stores under the Target banner during 2013 and 2014. The remaining acquired sites would be transferred to other retailers. HBC had said that it would continue to operate the remaining Zellers stores as a smaller chain in specific communities.

Of the maximum 220 locations, 105 to be transferred to Target were identified in late May 2011, and another lot of 84 locations in late September 2011, bringing the total number of Zellers stores acquired by Target to 189. Of these 189 stores, 39 were resold to Walmart Canada.

RioCan REIT was significantly affected, as many of its mall properties include Zellers locations. In addition, the United Food and Commercial Workers Union planned to hold demonstrations as many Zellers staffers were to be laid off instead of being retained by Target or Walmart. This was in marked contrast to the takeover of Woolco by Walmart in 1994, where all employees of the acquired stores were retained.

The President and CEO of Zellers, Mark Foote, had a mandate to liquidate the 273 Zellers stores in preparing it for Target's takeover by October 2011. As Zellers was not bankrupt, Foote's strategy was to use a blueprint of a retail liquidation, but without the typical insolvency and desperation that plagued failing chains. Foote focused on raising profits, even if that meant losing market share and reducing store traffic, by ramping up inventory levels of higher margin goods over loss leaders such as apparel over deeply discounted paper towels and detergent, and by slashing costs. Foote also replaced the expensive fall television advertising campaign with a social media blitz on Facebook. Reportedly, the strategy was paying off as Zellers operating profit was "well ahead of expectations and the retailer had performed very well in 2011.

In March 2012, the first 50 Zellers stores were put in liquidation. This included all 39 Zellers stores slated to become Walmart outlets. By mid-June, the latter locations were closed to the public. On June 25, 2012, 17 more stores in Ontario were put in liquidation.

The Hudson's Bay Company announced on July 26, 2012, that it would close most of the 64 remaining stores that were supposed to continue operating as Zellers outlets. A company spokesperson stated that these stores employ 6,400 people, or approximately 100 per location, range in size from 48,000 to 128,000 square feet and are mostly in small towns. The closings of these stores were to happen at the latest on March 31, 2013 which coincided with the deadline date the HBC had to vacate the sites acquired by Target. The HBC's main reason for closing the 64 remaining stores was due to Zellers lack of profitability. The HBC also remarked that it would not be viable to keep Zellers as an ongoing chain due to the geographical locations of the remaining 64 stores. The HBC did not exclude the possibility of keeping some stores open and converting them as The Bay or Home Outfitters outlets.

After the deal with Target Corporation, HBC still had a burden in half of the $226.4 million of Zellers lease obligations remaining through 2016, with the rent for 2012 alone being almost half of HBC's adjusted profit. With HBC preparing an initial public offering in late 2012, it either terminated these liabilities with landlords at steep discounts or found new tenants to sublet the space.

After HBC decided not to continue Zellers with the remaining 64 stores, these locations started their liquidation sale on December 26, 2012 and the company stopped accepting returns on January 31, 2013. Liquidators sold nearly all of Zellers merchandise, store fixtures and shopping carts at discounted prices.

=== 2013–2020: Liquidator ===
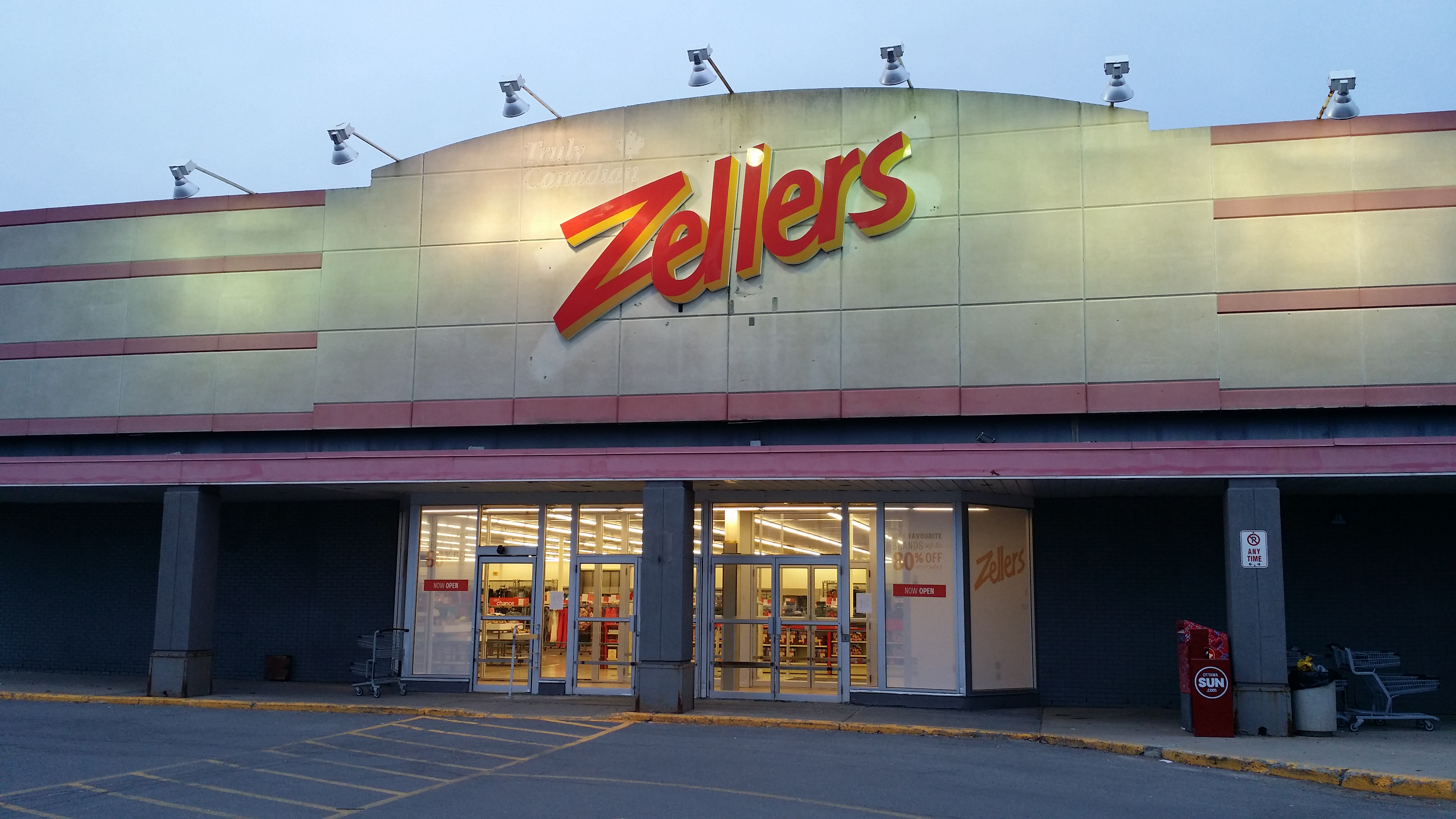
The storefront of the re-opened Zellers in Bells Corners, Ottawa (closed again in 2020)

In January 2013, HBC revised its strategy and decided to keep a total of three stores open under the Zellers banner after March 31, 2013. These locations no longer operated as discount department stores, but instead as liquidation outlets for sister chain The Bay. HBC communications manager Tiffany Bourré described these locations as featuring fashion apparel and a refined home product offering with more from other HBC banners.

Originally, these included the store at Place Bourassa in Montreal North, Quebec, but it closed in early 2014. Replacing it was a previously closed Zellers in the Ottawa community of Nepean, which reopened on April 3, 2014, keeping the number of stores at three. In September 2014, the last Zellers in Western Canada, at Semiahmoo Shopping Centre in Surrey, British Columbia, was closed, leaving only two stores remaining nationwide: at Kipling Queensway Mall in Etobicoke, Ontario, and Bells Corners in Nepean, Ontario. Both locations were closed on January 26, 2020.

=== 2021–2025: Hudson's Bay store-within-a-store relaunch ===
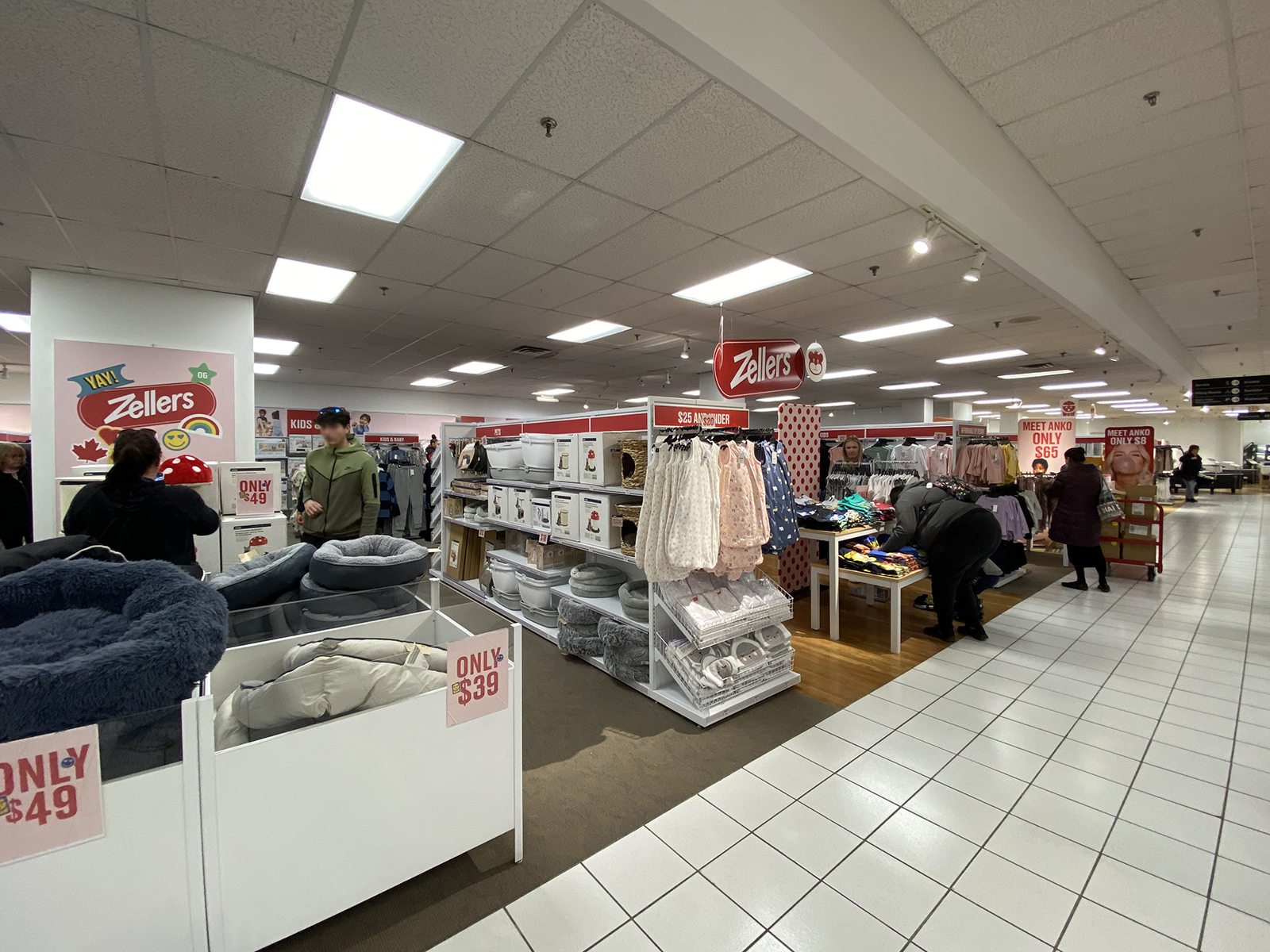
Zellers at former Hudson's Bay department store at Erin Mills Town Centre, Mississauga

In September 2021, as a pilot project, HBC relaunched the Zellers brand as a pop-up shop within a Hudson's Bay department store at the Burlington Centre mall in Ontario. Essentially a store-within-a-store concept, it sported hanging Zellers logo banners, the classic red-and-white painted walls colour scheme, and red floor lines to mark off one small section within the Hudson's Bay store. While offering a limited selection of goods, including Canada-branded apparel, bedding, housewares and toys, it mainly was intended to invoke a "fun and nostalgic experience" according to HBC. At the time, HBC stated more Hudson's Bay locations may use the concept in the future. Subsequent reporting by trade publication Retail Insider indicated the pop-up location may have been prompted by trademark filings by an unrelated group that had opened two stores under the Zellers (as well as Kmart Canada) brands after HBC allowed a trademark on the Zellers logo to expire in 2020; HBC sued the group to prevent what it alleged to be unauthorized use of a brand that it still controlled. Some retail analysts believed the re-introduction of Zellers was primarily due to HBC's lawsuit over protection of its trademark, using it as a demonstration of ownership of the brand, and doubted any successful expansion or revitalization of the former chain.

In March 2023, HBC formally brought back the Zellers brand as an e-commerce website and physical space within 12 select Hudson's Bay stores in Ontario and Alberta. By April 2023, there were 25 Hudson's Bay stores across Canada with a Zellers-themed section. After another wave of openings in August, it was announced in September 2023 that the totality of Hudson's Bay locations would have Zellers spaces by the end of the month. The Zellers shops ranged in size from 1,000 to 10,000 square feet (93 to 929 m^{2}), with the first 25 locations being typically larger than the ones that opened later in the year.

Customers were disappointed by the revival. Unlike the former Zeller discount stores, pricing was found to be overly expensive, and the experience dissimilar, with the small sections in most stores nearly indistinguishable from the rest of Hudson's Bay shopping spaces. Additionally, there were no dedicated or uniformed Zellers staff in-store, nor a return of the indoor restaurants, making the overall experience feel no different than shopping at a Hudson Bay store.

In March 2025, HBC filed for bankruptcy and began a liquidation and closure of most of its stores. On June 1, 2025, all HBC stores ceased retail operations and permanently closed. Most of HBC's intellectual properties were acquired by Canadian Tire. However, that deal did not include Zellers.

=== 2025: Relaunch under INC Group Inc. ===
On August 28, 2025, a relaunch of the Zellers brand was announced under new ownership, Les Ailes de la Mode. Les Ailes de la Mode is run by the same family that owns the retail clothing chains Fairweather and International Clothiers. Opening on October 30th, 2025 in the former anchor space of a Hudson's Bay at Londonderry Mall in Edmonton, the new Zellers originally focused on apparel, bedding, home goods, seasonal items and luggage. In January 2026, Zellers announced it was planning to expand across Canada. On June 18, 2026, Zellers opened a second store at 80 Orfus Road in North York, Toronto, Ontario. This new store introduced new categories; toys, snacks and beverages, and footwear, based on strong customer feedback. On November 12, 2026, a third Zellers store opened at the Cambridge Centre Mall, in Cambridge, Ontario, once again taking over the anchor space of a former Hudson's Bay.

== Stores ==
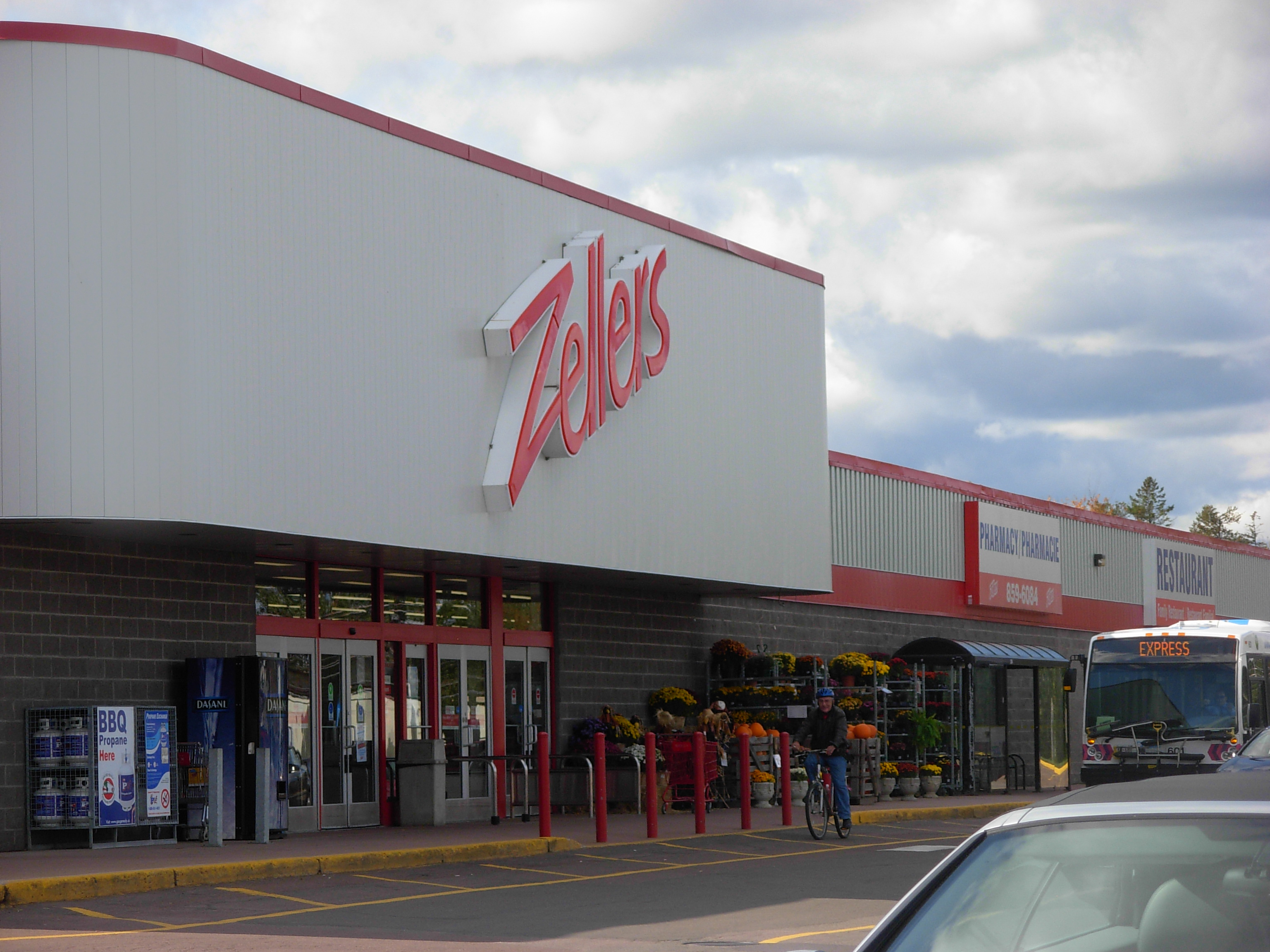
Former Zellers location in Moncton, New Brunswick

=== Original Chain ===
By 1960, Zellers began opening their popular big-box retail stores. Operating stores from St. John's, Newfoundland and Labrador, to Victoria, British Columbia, Zellers employed over 35,000 people. The average store size was 94,000 square feet (8,700 m^{2}). Zellers Select stores were designed for smaller markets with populations under 25,000, with stores averaged 45,000 square feet (4,200 m^{2}). Some multi-level stores were equipped with a shopping cart system known as the Cartveyor, designed to transport shopping carts between floors next to a standard escalator. While there were few that were so small, they were also equipped with elevators alongside escalators open to shoppers, such as with the Lawrence Square Shopping Centre (later renamed Lawrence Allen Centre in 2019) location in the North York district of Toronto; this location had two levels.

In July 2010, Zellers unveiled prototype store designs in five Winnipeg locations, with two more originally planned for late 2010 and early 2011. One store opened on the lower floor of the downtown Winnipeg Bay store, making it a Bay-Zellers hybrid location. These new prototype stores introduced a grocery department, as well as a re-configured design to ease the shopping experience for customers. The prototype stores are reminiscent of modern day supercentres operated by Walmart Canada and Loblaw Companies (through their Real Canadian Superstore and Real Atlantic Superstore chains).

=== Modern Stores ===
Under Les Ailes de la Mode, new Zellers stores range from 25,000 to 60,000 square feet (2,300 to 5,600 m²) and have a smaller selection of merchandise than the original chain. These locations generally occupy subdivided sections of former Hudson's Bay stores or renovated spaces previously used by Labels and Designer Depot, which are also owned by The INC Group. The revamped stores focus primarily on apparel, footwear, housewares, bedding, bath products, toys, gifts, seasonal products, snacks, candy, and non-perishable groceries. Unlike the original chain, the relaunched locations do not carry health and beauty products, electronics, major appliances, sporting goods, hardware, automotive supplies, or full-line departments. They also do not have plans to re-introduce the restaurant or pharmacy, but have re-introduced children rides from the original chain.

=== Restaurant ===
The Skillet, Zellers' in-store restaurant brand, launched in 1960. The restaurants underwent several revisions and were branded as Zellers Family Restaurant before their demise. In spring 2023, the Hudson's Bay Company brought the restaurant back as a food truck at select locations.

=== Liquidation Centres ===
Even before the three locations were converted in 2013 to serve as clearance stores for Hudson's Bay and Home Outfitters, the Zellers chain proper had also operated a few liquidation centres for its own merchandise. Those were typically former regular Zellers stores that had been converted as liquidation centres for a limited time before closing down for good. The Zellers Family restaurants continued operating in these liquidation centres.

== Products ==
Products sold at Zellers included clothing, non-perishable groceries, stationery, toys, and housewares.

=== Grocery ===
All original Zellers sold basic groceries such as dry snacks and other prepackaged foods. The Neighbourhood Market, formerly available at some locations, was Zellers' expanded section of grocery items, which included frozen and dairy aisles. Prototype stores in Winnipeg featured full grocery departments including fresh produce and baked goods. Such plans were dropped following Target Canada's acquisition of many Zellers leases. Some stores removed their The Neighbourhood Market section and expanded the other sections.

=== Exclusive labels ===
Zellers carried many of its own labels and also had exclusive rights in Canada to some other labels:

- Alfred Sung Home
- Beaumark
- Big Star
- Big Z (pillows)
- Home Studio
- Homestyles
- Hunt Club
- Marketsquare
- Midtown
- Nest by House & Home
- Request (promoted by Ashlee Simpson)
- Sportek (unrelated to Sport Chek, a retailer owned by Canadian Tire)
- Stuff by Hilary Duff
- Truly
- X Games
- Zeddy (baby products)

When Zellers relaunched as a pop-up store in 2023, they announced a new exclusive label, Anko, an Australian company. Its products are available online and at physical Zellers stores, as well as in Australian Kmart stores. The Zellers pop-up stores contain mostly products by Anko and in-house brands.

==== Acquired labels from Target ====
Some labels exclusive to Target Corporation in the United States were previously exclusive to Zellers in Canada. After Target's acquisition of Zellers leases until its closure, Target Canada became the exclusive store for the following brands:

- Cherokee
- Mossimo
- Wabasso

However, Target Canada closed in 2015, leaving Wabasso, and Mossimo unavailable in Canada since then. Cherokee was then carried by Sears Canada for a short period, until it too closed in January 2018. With the demise of Zellers, Target Canada and Sears Canada, these brands are no longer carried in Canada.

== Customer service ==
On January 6, 2012, CBC Television's Marketplace announced that Zellers received the title of Canada's Worst Customer Service as a department store, based on a survey conducted by CBC with the Léger Marketing research firm in eight metropolitan areas. The retailer refused to be interviewed by Marketplace host Erica Johnson regarding its ranking, providing her with a written statement instead. Zellers also did not offer a refund to the mystery shopper who bought a used coffeemaker that was presented as new, and attempted to return the product after the advertised 30-day return period. Zellers Customer Service did not respond to this customer's Twitter message seeking satisfactory resolution.

== Advertising ==
Zellers ran a Festive Finale advertising campaign in late 2011. Zeddy was also used as a mascot to advertise the retailer's toy selection.

=== Festive Finale ===
The Festive Finale campaign was used to advertise Zellers last Christmas and holiday season sale in December 2011. There was a website called ZellersFacebook.ca, which allowed customers to vote for their favourite coupon and musical genre. While Zellers recommended that customers have a Facebook account and Like the company, both of these steps were optional. It was also possible to record a radio commercial for Zellers Moonlight Madness sale by using a computer microphone and reading the site's teleprompter. Zellers also had social networking service accounts on Twitter and YouTube. Festive Finale was criticized for its Boxing Week coupon.

=== Loyalty program ===
As a Hudson's Bay Company subsidiary, Zellers promoted the Hudson's Bay Rewards program also available at Hudson's Bay and Home Outfitters. It had been known as Club Z and HBC Rewards. The program used a points card, available at no charge but only accepted by Zellers and other partners. A Hudson's Bay MasterCard issued by Capital One was also available, which rewards customers with one point per dollar spent on the card at any retailer. Any Zellers cashier failing to inform a customer about the HBC MasterCard had to give that customer 10,000 HBC points. This is equivalent to 250 Hudson's Bay points, or one eighth of the requirement for a $10 gift card. Hudson's Bay points could still be redeemed for Hudson's Bay gift cards.

=== Slogans ===
Numerous slogans were used by Zellers:

- Early 1980s: The low prices of Zellers are in the news (Zellers [sic] low prices are making headlines)
- 1980s: Only you'll know how little you paid
- 1980s: Shopping anywhere else is pointless
- Late 1980s and 1990s: Where the lowest price is the law!, followed by Where the lowest price is the law...everyday! and Because the lowest price is the law.
- 1990s: Truly Canadian
- 1997–2000: Better and Better
- 2000–2013: Everything from A to Z

=== Zeddy ===
Zeddy encourages children to ride the Zeddy Wheel attraction at Zellers.

Zeddy is a teddy bear mascot used by Zellers all over Canada. He was first used in 1986 as part of an advertising campaign, and then rose to his popularity by the early 1990s. The main purpose of Zeddy was to advertise Toyland, the toy section in Zellers stores. Zellers provided a stuffed Zeddy bear for any child who had a birthday party sponsored by Zellers. There was also a Zellers employee in a giant Zeddy costume hosting the party. A lineup of various Zeddy toys were also created. In the final months before the last of the Zellers stores were closed permanently, the company distributed large batches of stuffed Zeddy Bears for sale in stores throughout the network.

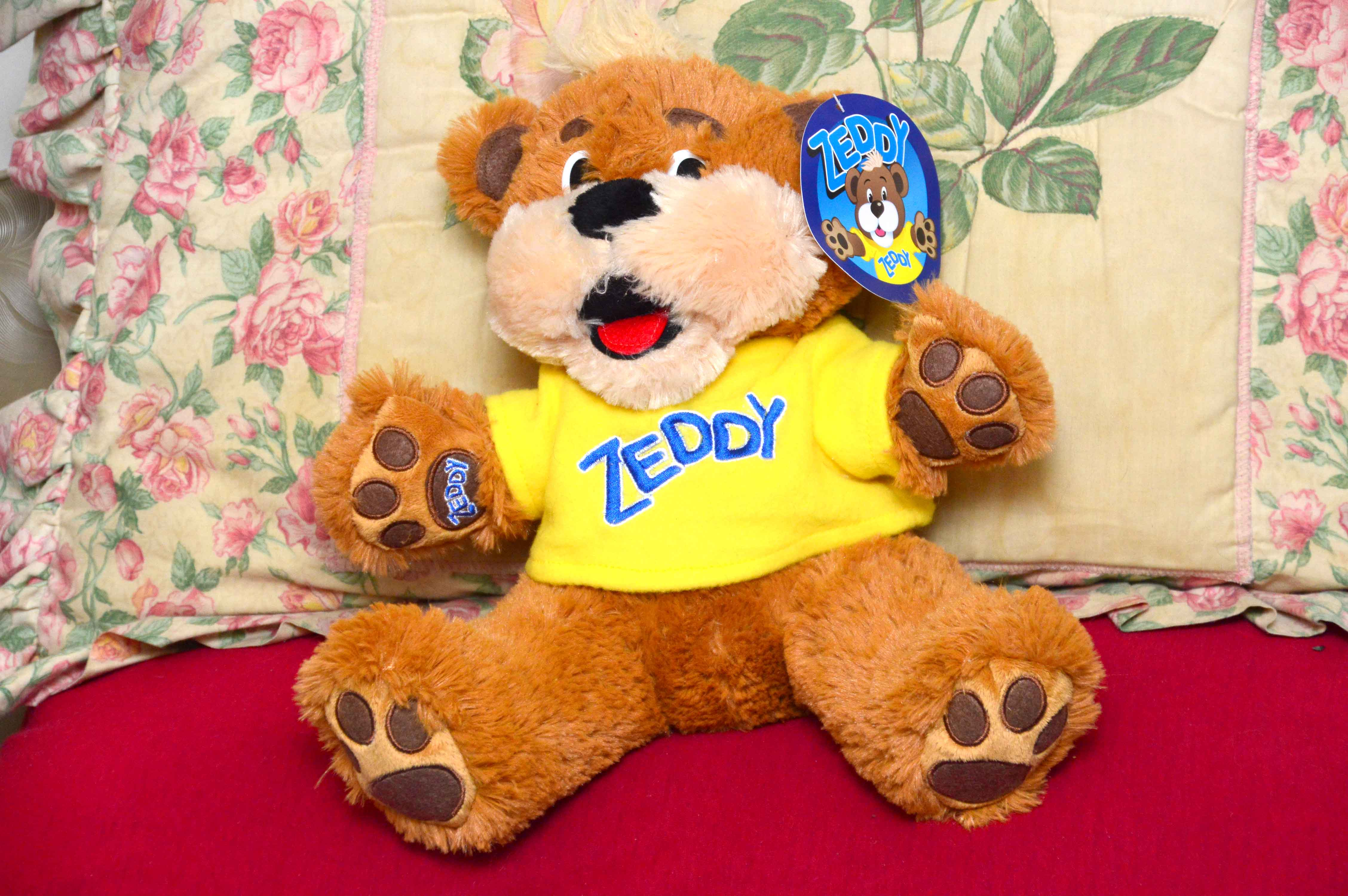
A Zeddy Bear, as sold in the chain's last months. A new version of the Zeddy Bear was introduced in 2023 that has a red shirt instead of a yellow one.

Many stores feature a Zeddy Wheel ride, which accommodates one young child on a miniature ferris wheel type ride. The ride costs $1 and plays carnival music when in use. When no one is riding the wheel, Zeddy says on a regular basis, "Come ride with me! All aboard the Zeddy Wheel!" in an attempt to attract customers. Despite Zeddy being withdrawn as the official mascot of Zellers in 2005, the Zeddy Wheel remained in operation at stores featuring it unless it was out of service, and the voice track was unchanged over the years. Some wheels removed the big Zeddy sticker in favour of multiple, small generic stickers.

Zeddy remains used as a baby brand for products such as diapers and baby bath products.

During the Festive Finale campaign in 2011, Zeddy was reintroduced in weekly flyers for Zellers Toyland before closing their stores for Target or Walmart. The character was used as a static picture, but no animated television commercials of him were made during this season. However, some employees decided to wear the Zeddy costume to celebrate the return of the teddy bear. Shortly thereafter, in December 2011, Zellers launched a Zeddy Bucks promotion. Those who spent at least $50 before taxes on toys received a pair of red 2012 Summer Olympics mittens, plus a $10 Zeddy Bucks voucher. This voucher could only be used on a later date.

With the last Zellers stores set to close in 2013, the Hudson's Bay Company announced in September 2012 that it was looking for a charity organization to adopt Zeddy so that the mascot could live on after Zellers. In a social media ad campaign, Zellers Everything Must GO Including Zeddy, Zeddy was featured in an online video where the mascot was abandoned in the woods by a Zellers executive telling Zeddy that Zellers was liquidating, and everything must go, including him. Organizations were invited to submit on Zellers Facebook page what their plans for Zeddy were. There were over 30,000 votes, and the final three contenders were Autism Ontario, Camp Trillium and Cystic Fibrosis Canada. Voters selected Camp Trillium as the winner and chosen adopter. There are several notable Zeddy iterations including, most famously, bush pilot Zeddy.

Zeddy was re-introduced upon the relaunch of the chain in 2025, and made a return to store shelves on November 12, 2026.

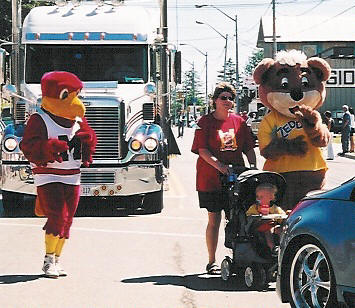
Zeddy, on the far right, is walking in a parade in 2003.

Zeddy appears in the Toyland section of Toyland in November 2011.

== See also ==
Other former discount retailers that once operated in Canada and similar concept as Zellers:

- Horizon, a discount competitor created by the T. Eaton Company that operated from 1972 to 1978
- Kmart Canada opened its first store in 1929 as Kresge and closed Canadian operations in 1998; some of its stores sold to Zellers
- Target Canada opened in 2013 after acquiring a number of former Zellers leases (it ceased operations two years later, in 2015)
- Towers Department Stores emerged in 1960 and ceased operations in 1991; all stores sold to Zellers
- Woolco appeared in the 1960s and closed operations completely in 1994; most stores sold to Walmart, some later acquired by Zellers
- Retail apocalypse
  - List of retailers affected by the retail apocalypse
