= Vive Crop Protection =

Vive Crop Protection is a privately held company based in Toronto, Canada, that develops new products based on existing active ingredients for pesticides using its patented Allosperse technology. The company has offices, laboratories, and manufacturing facilities in Mississauga, Ontario.

== History ==
The company was founded out of the Department of Chemistry at the University of Toronto in 2006 by Professor M. Cynthia Goh and co-developers of Vive’s technology, Dr. Darren Anderson, Dr. Jordan Dinglasan, Dr. Jane Goh and Dr. Richard Loo. Dr. Anderson is currently the President of Vive. Dr. Dinglasan developed the company’s core technology and is currently the Product Development Manager at Vive.

== Funding ==
Vive has received continuous funding since its inception, from the Ontario Centres of Excellence’s Accelerator Fund, Sustainable Development Technology Canada, the Ministry of Research and Innovation (Ontario)’s Innovation Demonstration Fund and FedDev as well as internal and external private investors.

As of June 2023, Vive Crop Protection raised $45.9 million (CAD) as part of their Series C financing.

== Awards and acknowledgments ==
Vive was awarded a Deloitte Technology Green 15 award in 2009. The award recognizes Canada’s leading green technology companies that promote a "more efficient use and re-use of the earth's resources in industrial production and consumption".

The company has also been featured in a number of articles by various media outlets, including Canadian Business Magazine, the Globe and Mail, the Toronto Star and various University of Toronto publications.

== Technology focus ==
Vive's primary focus is developing fertilizer-compatible products for at-plant application of crop protection and fertilizer simultaneously. Vive is also developing new soil-applied products with controlled mobility in soil, as well as new seed treatment products. Vive's core technology is called the Allosperse delivery system. Allosperse is a water-dispersible polymer-based delivery system.
