= SAAN (department store) =

Canadian department store chain

SAAN Stores Ltd.
- Type: Discount store chain
- Industry: Retail
- Founded: 1947
- Defunct: 2008
- Fate: Filed for bankruptcy, stores shut down, chain bought on asset basis
- Headquarters: Mississauga, Ontario, Canada
- Products: Clothing, grocery, footwear, bedding, beauty products, and housewares.

SAAN Stores Ltd. was a Canadian chain of discount department stores founded in Winnipeg, Manitoba.

SAAN is short for Surplus Army, Air Force, Navy. The chain's head office was in Mississauga, Ontario, and its main distribution centre and Stores Support Office complex were located in Winnipeg, with an additional distribution outlet in Montreal. SAAN also operated a small chain of clearance stores called Red Apple Clearance Centres.

SAAN had more than 350 stores in the late 1990s; however, by May 2005, after it emerged from bankruptcy protection, this was reduced to 142 outlets in a number of communities (mostly smaller towns and cities) across Canada.

== History ==
SAAN was established in 1947 by founders Albert and Sam Cohen, who opened their first store on Main Street in Winnipeg, Manitoba.

Surplus items from the Canadian armed forces (hence the store's name) were the company's first supply source until its sales grew and more SAAN stores opened. From there, the number of stores grew to over 200 in Western Canada and Ontario, focusing on clothing, footwear and accessories. SAAN expanded into Eastern Canada in February 1997 with the acquisition of 89 locations once owned by other retailers including Greenbergs; that same year, the chain added hard goods such as kitchen items, bed and bath items, furniture, toys, housewares, stationery and health and beauty products to their product lines.

By the late 1990s, SAAN had more than 350 stores. By May 2005, however, after it emerged from bankruptcy protection, this was reduced to 142 outlets in a number of communities (mostly smaller towns and cities) across Canada.

In June 2008, SAAN announced they would be closing all stores within 8 to 10 weeks, with a going-out-of-business sale being conducted by a joint venture group led by Great American Group LLC, which specialized in providing liquidation services. All remaining 126 stores closed within the following weeks, with some closing earlier than others. Most of the chain's locations and its intellectual properties were bought on an asset basis by TBS Holdings, owner of The Bargain! Shop chain, in August 2008.

== See also ==
- List of Canadian department stores
