= Shapiro, Bernstein & Co. =

American music publishing company

Shapiro, Bernstein & Co., Inc. is an American music publishing company established in 1900.

== History ==
The company was established 1900 in New York's Tin Pan Alley by Maurice Shapiro (1872–1911), who had worked at Adelphi Music publishing company, and his brother-in-law, real-estate dealer Louis Bernstein (1873–1962) (not to be confused with the Louis Bernstein better known as Leonard). Early on the company also included songwriter Harry Von Tilzer, who composed what became the company's first hit, "A Bird in a Gilded Cage". The song, with lyrics by Arthur J. Lamb, sold two million copies of sheet music, which encouraged Von Tilzer to form his own publishing company in 1902. When Maurice Shapiro died in 1911, Bernstein took over the company.

The company became a successful publisher of popular music, especially novelty songs. They made a contract with newspaper publisher William Randolph Hearst in 1916 to include their songs in Hearst's newspapers, which greatly increased the sales. Among the company's successful publications was Vernon Dalhart's "The Prisoner's Song", published in 1924.

One of the company's major hits was "Yes! We Have No Bananas" published in 1923. The same year the song was published, they sued lyricist and publicist C.F. Zittel who was making a film using the title "Yes, We Want No Bananas" which they considered an unauthorized use of the title. Shapiro, Bernstein & Co. did give permission to producer George Lederer to produce a musical using the title, but the project did not come to fruition.

The company published the iconic big band era song "In the Mood", recorded by Glenn Miller in 1939 on RCA Victor Bluebird Records, which became a record that defined the era.

Shapiro and Bernstein, along with Decca Records and Columbia Pictures, formed a company called Mood Music in 1947 to publish songs from film musicals including The Jolson Story.

In May 2020, Shapiro Bernstein was acquired by Golnar Khosrowshahi's Reservoir Media Management.

== Company name ==
The company started out as Shapiro, Bernstein & Von Tilzer. When Von Tilzer left in 1902, the name was changed to Shapiro, Bernstein & Co.

Shapiro joined Jerome H. Remick in 1904 to form Shapiro & Remick, Co., but left the company to Remick in 1905. The following year he re-established his own publishing firm under the name Shapiro Music Publisher. Bernstein changed the name back to Shapiro, Bernstein & Co. after Shapiro's death.

== See also ==
- Shapiro, Bernstein and Co. v. H.L. Green Co.
