= H. L. Green Company =

American store chain

H. L. Green
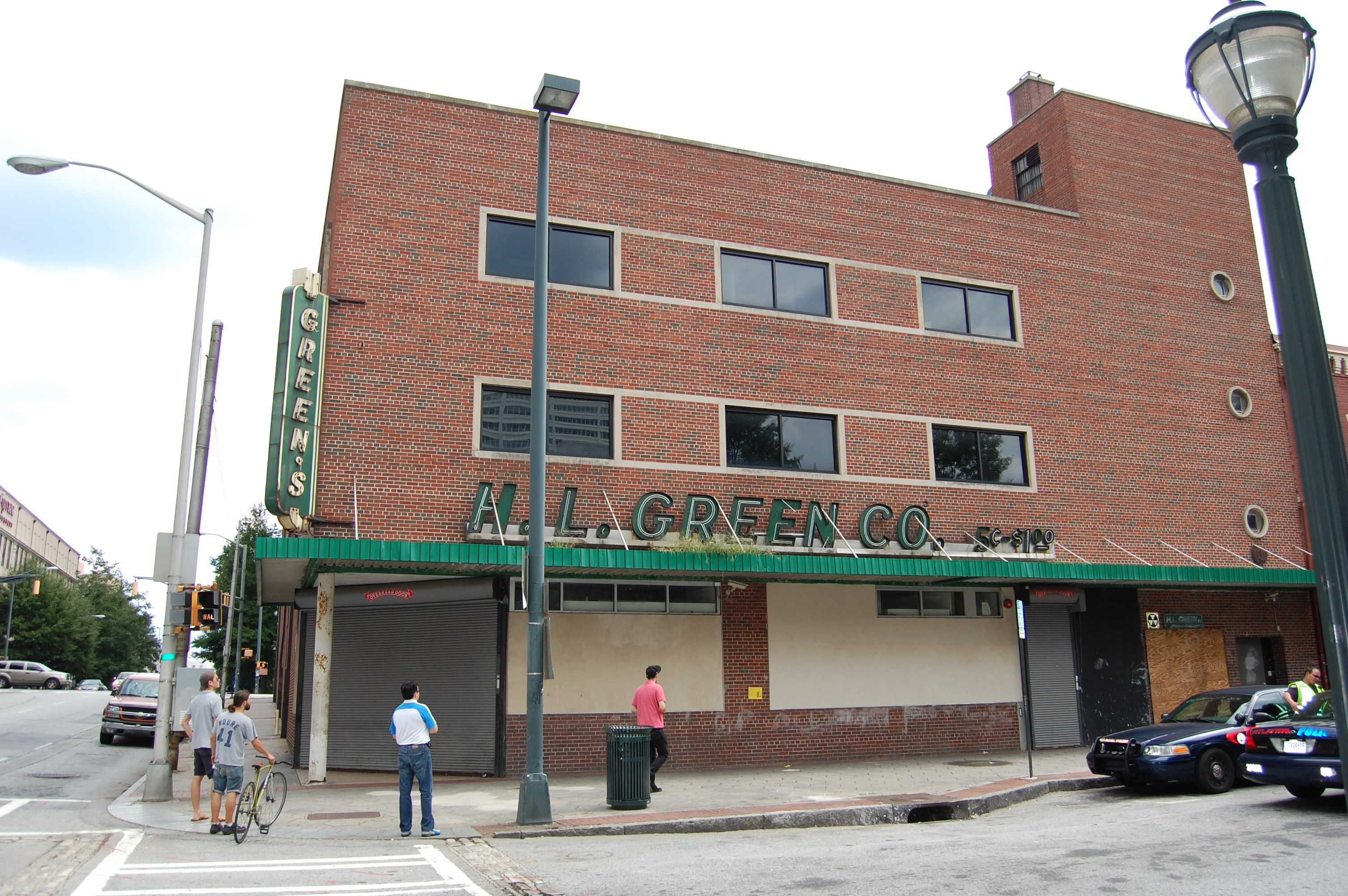
- An H. L. Green Storefront in Atlanta, Georgia.
- Industry: Variety store
- Founded: 1932
- Founder: Harold L. Green
- Defunct: 1990s
- Fate: Closed as part of parent company (McCrory Stores) bankruptcy in 2001.

H. L. Green was a five and dime store chain in the United States during the twentieth century named for founder Harold L. Green (1892–1951).

== History ==
The chain was formed in 1932. The chain operated 133 retail stores as of 1935, most resulting from the acquisition of Metropolitan Chain Stores, Inc. (of which Harold Green had been president), F. & W. Grand Stores, Isaac Silver and Brothers Company, and F. & W. Grand-Silver Stores, Inc.

Harold David Kittinger, who had founded the Kittinger's chain which had merged with McLellan's, served as a company executive from 1932 until his death in 1947, at which time he was president of a chain that had grown to 200 stores. It also owned the Schulte-United department store (Canadian unit was sold to Zellers).

By 1957, the chain had 227 stores, and was beginning to locate in shopping centers. Green acquired Olen Company, a retailer based in Mobile, Alabama. Maurice Olen became president of the combined company, but left after an investigation revealed an asset shortage, leading to an investigation by the U.S. Securities and Exchange Commission, and lawsuits by the company against Olen. Olen was indicted and fined $2,500.

It acquired United Stores, which owned a significant share of McCrory Stores and McLellan Stores, in 1959, but sold this in 1960 to B.T.L Corporation (which also owned Ben Franklin Stores). In 1961 McCrory Stores merged with H. L. Green, the combined company taking the McCrory name. The same week this was announced, McCrory took over Lerner Stores. H. L. Green sold its Canadian subsidiary Metropolitan Stores and some other assets at this time, reducing the number of stores in its system from 366 to 147.

H. L. Green was the subject of an important copyright legal case in the 1960s, Shapiro, Bernstein and Co. v. H.L. Green Co., in which a vendor of records in an H. L. Green store sold bootleg records.

The stores named H. L. Green closed as McCrory's entered bankruptcy in the late 1990s.

== Desegregation ==
Like many similar stores, it had segregated lunch counters in its stores in the Southern United States and became the subject of protests (including sit-ins) in the early 1960s. In the North, individual store managers occasionally took the initiative to break the color line in hiring, as occurred in the early 1950s in Newark, New Jersey.

== In popular culture ==
H. L. Green’s store and sign, is prominently shown in the movie ‘Thunder Force’, a 2021 film starring Melissa McCarthy and Octavia Spencer. Although the fictional story about two reunited childhood friends, is set in Chicago, IL, the actual location of the H. L. Green’s depicted, is in Atlanta, GA, where most of the movie was filmed. The specific scene is when Lydia (Melissa McCarthy) uses her super strength to pick up and throw a ‘Chicago’ No. 88 bus toward Buckingham Fountain. H. L. Green’s neon sign is clearly visible in vivid green lettering and background.
