= Harold Leavenworth Green =

American businessman

Harold Leavenworth Green (May 31, 1892 – April 13, 1951) was the chairman and founder of the H.L. Green Company five and dime store chain. He founded the chain as a product of mergers in 1932, and at the time of his death it had more than 200 stores.

He was born in Ansonia, Connecticut. He graduated from Sheffield Scientific School of Yale University as a mechanical engineer in 1912. He was 59 at the time of his death in Miami Beach, Florida.
