= Morley Cohen =

Canadian entrepreneur and philanthropist (1917–2001)

Morley Mitchell Cohen, CM CQ, born in Winnipeg, Manitoba (1917–2001), was a Canadian entrepreneur, community builder, philanthropist, and Member of the Order of Canada. He served with the Royal Canadian Air Force from 1940 to 1945.

== Background ==
Cohen came from a poor immigrant family of eight, the son of Alexander and Rose (Diamond) Cohen. By 1939, the family created General Distributors Ltd. and in the early fifties, the company obtained exclusive Canadian rights for Paper Mate pens

== Philanthropy ==
Cohen has been referenced to be one of the major community builders/philanthropists in Montreal

Several of his notable accomplishments include:

- Former Director of the Montreal Board of Trade (1973–1975)
- Former Chairman, Capital Fund Drive, YMHA (1980)
- Former Chairman, Arthritis Society (1980)
- Former Director of Canadian Unity Council (1983)
- Former Director of Montreal General Hospital (1988)
- Former Chairman, Capital Campaign, Montreal Museum of Fine Arts (1989).

== Morley and Rita Cohen Foundation ==
Founded in 1990, the Morley and Rita Cohen Foundation was created for support and services within the charitable sector, hospitals, and universities/colleges.

== Awards ==
- Honorary Doctorate, Philosophy, University of Haifa (1985)
- National Order of Quebec (1995)
- Order of Canada (2000)

== Sources ==
- The Acquisitors, the Canadian Establishment, by Peter C. Newman, 1981, McClelland and Stewart (Toronto, Ont).
- The Entrepreneurs, the Story of Gendis, by Albert D. Cohen, 1985, McClelland and Stewart (Toronto, Ont). McClelland and Stewart. 1985. ISBN 9780771021862. OL 2658612M.
- "Morley Cohen Honored at Friends of Haifa Dinner, 1985, The Montreal Gazette".
- Lumley, Elizabeth (2003). Canadian Who's Who, 2003. University of Toronto Press. ISBN 9780802088659.
