= The Bargain! Shop =

Canadian discount variety store chain

The Bargain! Shop Holdings, Inc.
- Company type: Private
- Industry: Retail
- Founded: 1991
- Headquarters: Mississauga, Ontario, Canada
- Products: Clothing, grocery, footwear, bedding, beauty products, and housewares.
- Website: http://www.tbsstores.com/

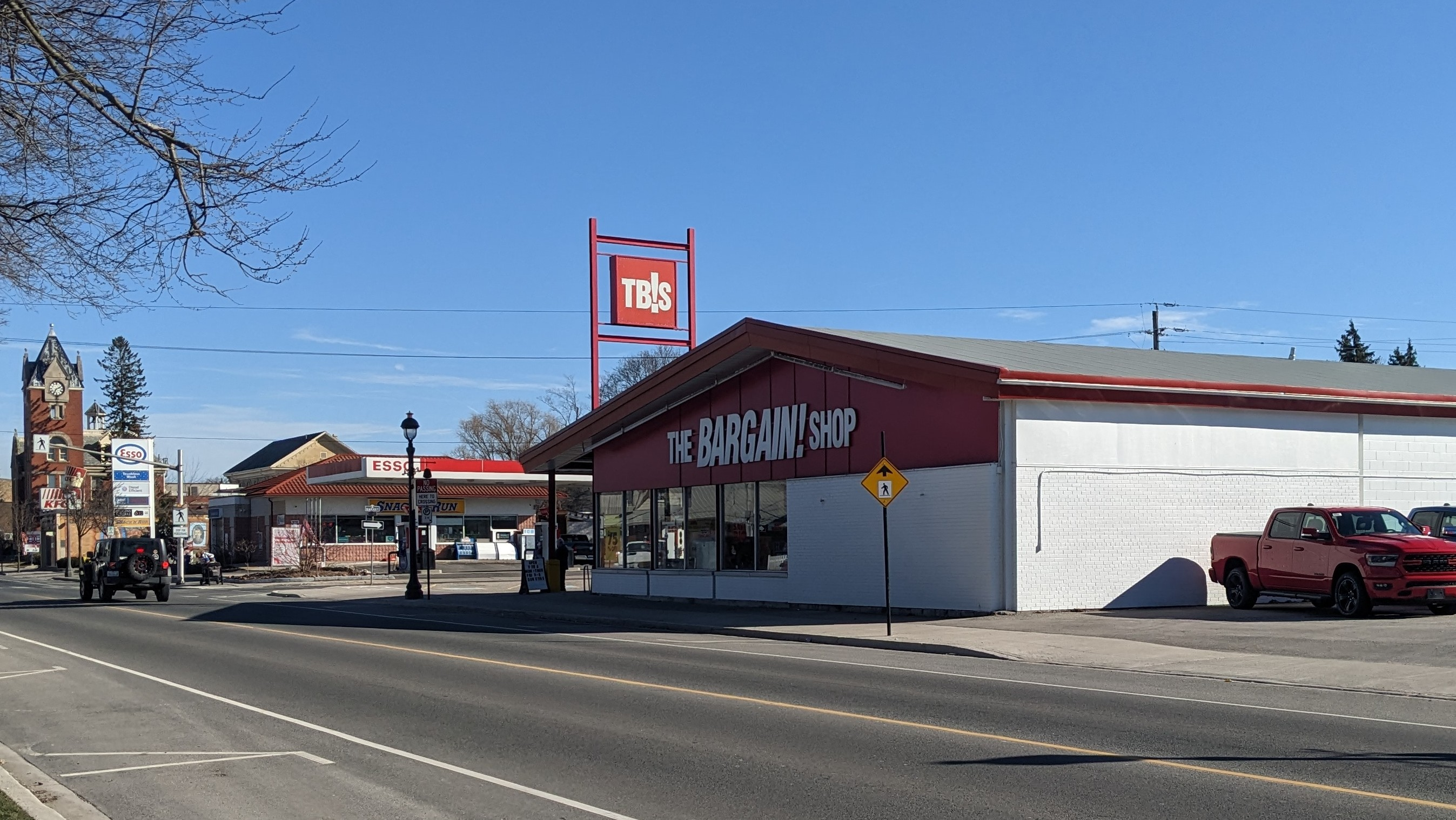
The Bargain! Shop in Aylmer, Ontario

The Bargain! Shop Holdings, Inc., also known as TB!S, is a Canadian discount variety store chain operating in all Anglophone provinces in Canada, except PEI.

The Bargain! Shop originated as a closeout store division of Woolworth Canada, developed out of some of the bankrupt assets of Bargain Harold's in 1991. The chain averaged 10,000 square feet (930 m^{2}) and grew into 90 stores within just a year of its establishment.

In late 1993, in order to try to make the Woolworth variety stores profitable in Canada, 101 of 123 Woolworth stores were converted to The Bargain! Shop, therefore bringing the total number of stores to 194. Some of the larger Woolco stores were also converted to The Bargain! Shop.

In late 1999, in a rush to try to pay the debt on time, Venator Group Inc. closed 109 stores (including all stores in the province of Quebec) and sold the rest of The Bargain! Shop chain to a Canadian investment company. However, the closures only reduced sales from $259 million to about $100 million.

In 2008, it was announced that The Bargain! Shop had acquired 93 of the former SAAN locations. They are mostly located in Atlantic Canada and Ontario.

In September 2012, The Bargain! Shop began re-branding their stores to Red Apple in most towns.
