= Conquest of New France =

1758–1760 British military conquest

- Part of the Seven Years' War
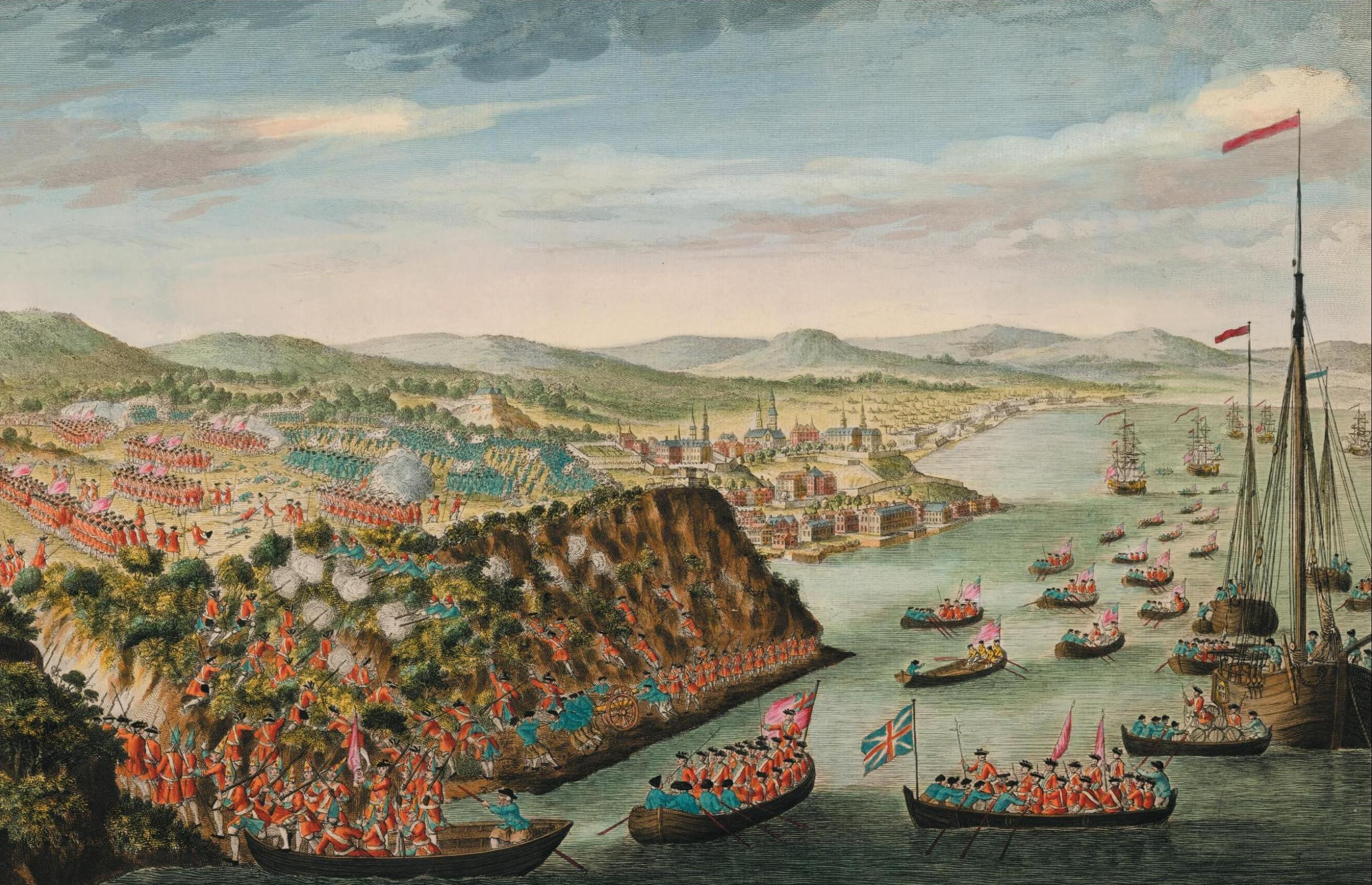
- Depiction of the Battle of the Plains of Abraham in 1759, a decisive British victory that led to the British occupation of Quebec City, visible at centre
Date	24 July 1758 – 8 September 1760 (2 years, 1 month, 2 weeks and 1 day)
Location	French Canada (Modern day Canada)
Result	British victory
Territorial changes	New France absorbed from the French colonial empire into the British Empire

Belligerents
(Kingdom of Great Britain) Great Britain: Thirteen Colonies; (Haudenosaunee) Iroquois Confederacy	(Kingdom of France) France: (New France) Colony of Canada; Wabanaki Confederacy

Commanders and leaders
(Kingdom of Great Britain) James Wolfe †; (Kingdom of Great Britain) Jeffrey Amherst; (Kingdom of Great Britain) James Murray; (Kingdom of Great Britain) William Haviland; (Kingdom of Great Britain) John Prideaux †; (Kingdom of Great Britain) William Johnson; (Kingdom of Great Britain) Eyre Massey; (Kingdom of Great Britain) Robert Swanton; (Kingdom of Great Britain) Richard Montgomery; (Kingdom of Great Britain) Robert Monckton; (Kingdom of Great Britain) George Townshend; (Kingdom of Great Britain) William Howe; (Kingdom of Great Britain) Charles Saunders; (Kingdom of Great Britain) Charles Lawrence; (Kingdom of Great Britain) Edward Whitmore; (Kingdom of Great Britain) Edward Boscawen; Robert Rogers; James Rogers; (Haudenosaunee) Sayenqueraghta	(Kingdom of France) Louis Montcalm †; (Kingdom of France) François Lévis (surrendered); Louis Vergor; Charles Langlade; Jean Ramezay; Louis Bougainville; (Kingdom of France) Pierre Pouchot (POW); (Kingdom of France) Michel Maray; (Kingdom of France) Jean Vauquelin (surrendered); (Kingdom of France) Charles Bourlamaque; (Kingdom of France) Jean Dumas; (Kingdom of France) Augustin Drucour; (Kingdom of France) Louis de l' Isle (POW); (New France) Daniel Joncaire; (New France) François Lignery (DOW); (New France) Charles Aubry; (New France) Pierre Rigaud (surrendered)

Strength
26,000 men 150 guns 40 warships 150 transport vessels	~20,000 men 132 guns 18 warships

Casualties and losses
Total: 3,257; 933 killed 2,291 wounded 10 captured 20 guns 2 ships destroyed 1 ship lightly damaged	Total: 10,933–11,362; 1,103–1,448 killed 1,870–1,942 wounded 7,895–8,010 captured 7 ships destroyed 11 ships captured 3 ships scuttled

The Conquest of New France occurred during the Seven Years' War, fought in North America between the Kingdom of Great Britain and the Kingdom of France. It started with a British campaign in 1758 and ended with the region being put under a British military regime between 1760 and 1763. Britain's acquisition of the French colony of Canada, which France had established in 1535, became official with the 1763 Treaty of Paris that concluded the Seven Years' War. The term is usually used when discussing the impact of the British conquest on the 70,000 French colonist inhabitants, as well as on the First Nations peoples. At issue in popular and scholarly debate ever since is the British treatment of the French settler population along with the long-term historical impacts of the conquest.

== Background ==
Although the military of New France saw early success during the Seven Years' War, a series of campaigns between 1758 and 1760 saw the British capture most of New France.

The conquest represents the final episode of a long series of conflicts between Britain and France over their North American colonies. In the decades preceding the Seven Years' War and the Conquest of New France, both Britain's and France's interest toward their North American colonies rapidly grew and the region became an important source of tensions between the two powers. British America became a very lucrative export market during the first half of the 18th century and gained in importance in the eyes of British policymakers. The growing economic value of the North American colonies convinced many influential members of the British public that those colonies should be expanded and that France's territorial claims on the continent should not be allowed to stand in the way. Furthermore, the nature of the British Empire fundamentally changed in the years following the War of the Austrian Succession; moving from a maritime and commercial empire to a more centralized and controlled empire. This change encouraged the British government to increase its commitments toward its North American colonies and their backcountry (for example, the Ohio Valley).

In opposition to the British, the French did not justify the defence of its European colonies through economic interests. On the contrary, many French policymakers believed that the colony was an economic drain for France and argued that its value was mostly for strategic purposes. France's leaders felt it would be difficult to compete with the British Royal Navy and were afraid that Great Britain's maritime superiority could threaten its profitable colonies in the West Indies as well as its main standing in Europe.

Almost an afterthought for London and Versailles was the fact that these desired lands were already populated by Indigenous peoples (different groups or tribes) that had a long history fighting each other. Each band was keen to have a strong ally that could provide sophisticated weapons and other desirable items, not least of which was alcohol. Alliances were finicky. The French had a better relationship based mainly on the fur trade. The British had been more generous with land treaties and weapons. Issues emerged about trust.

=== Opposing forces ===
From a numerical point of view, New France had always been at disadvantage when compared to the more populous British Thirteen colonies of British America. When the hostilities began, New France could only claim a population of approximately 80,000 white inhabitants, 55,000 of whom lived in Canada. In opposition, the Thirteen Colonies could count on a population of 1,160,000 white inhabitants and 300,000 black ones, both free and enslaved. Yet the number of regular troops available at the beginning of the conflict did not reflect this demographic inequality. In 1755, New France was defended by 3,500 professional soldiers, while the Thirteen Colonies relied on two Irish regiments – between 1,500 and 2,000 career soldiers – who were supported by two other regiments of New England conscripts. Thus, the balance of power on land was initially more or less equal. On the seas, the situation was much more one-sided in favour of the British Navy. In 1755, Britain had 90 warships against France's 50, a disparity that only widened with time. This maritime domination gave Britain a clear advantage in terms of its ability to send reinforcements and supply to its North American colonies.

== Conquest ==
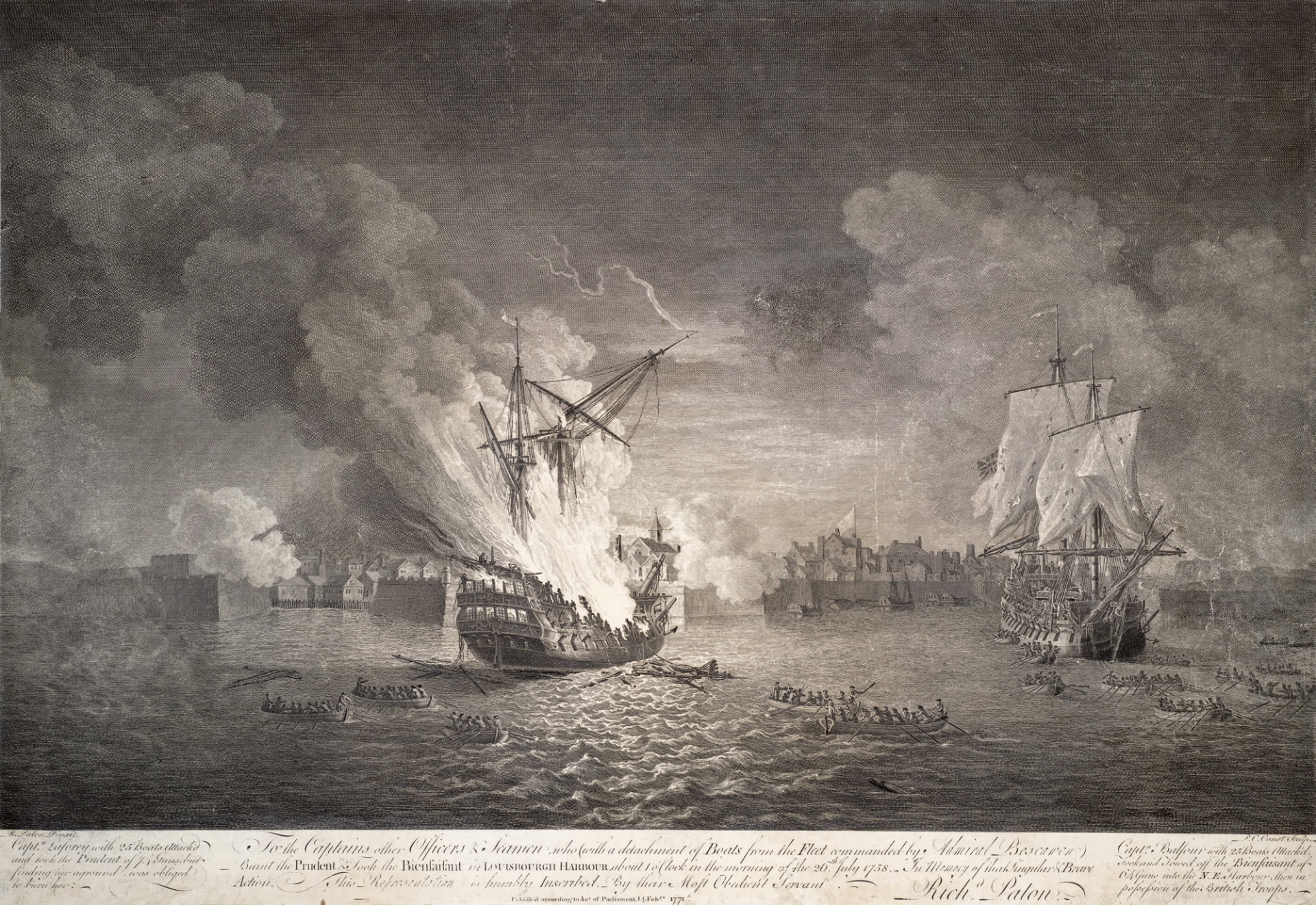
Depiction of the burning of the French ship Prudent, and the capture of Bienfaisant during the Siege of Louisbourg.

What would later be dubbed "the Conquest" began in 1758, when, under the direction of statesman William Pitt, the British made a conscious effort to bolster their military efforts in the North American theatre. That they would actually succeed in conquering the entire French colony of Canada was, at the time, entirely uncertain.

=== Louisbourg ===
In July, 1758, a British expedition led by Major-General Jeffery Amherst successfully captured the Fortress Port of Louisbourg in the French colony of Île Royale. Once the British Navy delivered the British Army to Île Royale, the siege was initiated. The siege of Louisbourg was the first major battle (and the first major British victory) of the conquest. The siege took eight weeks, and the French surrendered on July 26, 1758.

After the triumph at Louisbourg, Amherst planned three fronts, all to be effected in the new year, to finally drive the French out of New France. Based in Albany, Major-General Jeffery Amhurst would move north against Fort Carillon and then to Montreal. A second force would attack Fort Duquesne, at the strategic confluence of the Allegheny and Monongahela rivers, which formed the Ohio River. The French had claimed the Ohio River Valley giving it the name la Belle Rivière.

=== First Quebec campaign ===
The third attack was assigned to General Wolfe. He had the task of capturing the fortress city of Quebec. Admiral Saunders was assigned the task of getting the British forces to Quebec and supporting Wolfe. Upon arrival, the army set up base five kilometres from Quebec City at the Île d'Orléans (whose French inhabitants had partially evacuated after the news of Louisbourg surfaced). After the British base was firmly established, Wolfe ordered his artillerymen to begin bombarding Quebec City. Though the constant bombardment took its toll on civilian morale, it did not represent a real military threat for the French.

From the beginning, Wolfe understood that British success hinged on being able draw the French army out of their fortifications and into a decisive battle. The French army's principal commander, Louis-Joseph de Montcalm, was, however, always hesitant to commit his troops to a single attack or position. Believing that the British campaign would eventually run out of supplies (or would be crushed by Canada's harsh winter), Montcalm's strategy focused primarily on defence. As a result, French retaliations were often sporadic, and were sometimes carried out solely by untrained civilian volunteers.

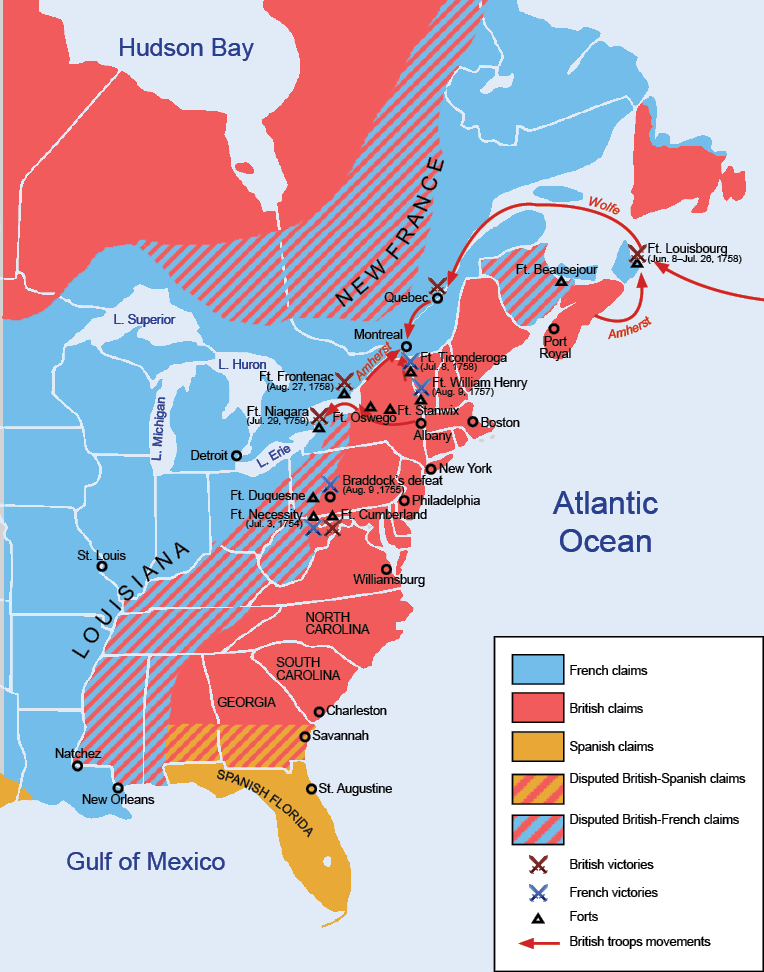
Schematic map of the French and Indian War

Initially and throughout the summer, all attention was to the east of Quebec City. Louis-Joseph de Montcalm-Grozon, marquis de Montcalm de Saint-Veran was a master of Defence and secured the eastern flank of the city. By August 1759, both sides (especially the British) were weakened from a year of intermittent battles, and Wolfe had still not made significant headway. Aware that the British campaign was on its last legs, he mustered his remaining troops and resources for one last campaign. Wolfe was convinced that his success would be to the east, but his subordinate Generals suggested attacking from the west. Surprise was essential. Wolfe landed his troops on the north-shore west of Quebec City and scaled the steep escarpment during the predawn hours of September 13. The most difficult aspect of this plan was to land 5,000 troops and supplies at night, from boats in a powerful river. Through rigorous training and with skilled naval support, this was effected between 4 am and 7 am. The first troops to emerge atop the cliffs secured a foothold by deceiving and then overpowering the light guard. By the time the French realized the British were approaching the gates of the city, they were forced to charge the British in the European style, in columns and ranks deployed across the open ground known as the Plains of Abraham.

Wolfe deployed this troops across the entire battlefield while securing his flanks. This required him to abandon the traditional line three ranks deep. With a line two soldiers deep, he had his troops load their muskets with two balls. He then instructed them to hold firm until the French were 30 paces away ensuring a powerful deliver of that shot. Realizing that his troops were vulnerable, Wolfe had his troops lie on the ground during the initial stage of the French attack.

Montcalm was not prepared for this attack from the west. During the entire summer, all had been focused on the Beauport defence east of the city. Montcalm had positioned a light guard along the western approaches, but at no time was there ever indication that the British would try to land along the rushing river shore and have an army climb up the cliffs. He believed he had sufficient force in place on the west to suppress any British attempt and the British never offered any clue to this being something they might do. Now that the threat was imminent, Montcalm rushed to position his troops. Regulars in the centre, Militia and Indigenous allies on the flanks. Montcalm was eager to crush the British before they could secure their position. After a short artillery bombardment, he ordered his three columns forward. Due to the rough nature of the terrain, his troops were not able to maintain the shape of the columns and his front began to look like one awkward body of men. Once the order to fire was given, the French volleys were ineffective. Suddenly they suffered a most terrible result. The first British volley was devastating. Now the British began to advance, while reloading. The second British volley struck before the shock of the first volley had been realized. The surviving French troops had no thoughts other than to find a safe place to hide. The battle was won. By the time the French fled, General Wolfe was dead. He had sustained a first wound when a ball hit his wrist while giving final instructions along the line. He was able to continue. He positioned himself in line among his beloved Grenadiers. Just as he was preparing to give the order to fire, he was struck twice more, one in the gut and one in the chest. The men beside him carried him back a short distance. When asked if he wanted the surgeon; he answered no, "all is over with me". When told that the French were on the run, he gave orders to try to prevent them from escaping across Saint-Charles River. His final words, "Now, God be praised, I die contented".

As the French retreated, if not completely routed, General Montcalm, on horse, tried to reorganize his troops. He suddenly slouched in his saddle. He was struck in the back by a musket ball. He was assisted by a couple of officers and hobbled into the city. He was taken before a surgeon, who announced Montcalm would not live through the night. He died at sunrise on 14 September 1759. The battle was over but the fate of Quebec was not certain until the next year. The British forced the surrender of the city and took possession within a week but the Navy had to return to England before the river iced over. The British had a most difficult winter, mainly because they had destroyed the city during months of siege and bombardment. Meanwhile, the French were much more comfortable planning a spring counter assault from warm buildings in Montreal.

=== Second Quebec campaign ===
The impact of the Battle of the Plains of Abraham, especially the deaths of Montcalm and Wolfe, has sometimes been exaggerated. Though a major victory, the epic battle did not, at the time, guarantee success for the British campaign. Likewise, though Montcalm's death was a huge blow to French morale, it was not the essential element of defeat. The conquest, simply put, was more than the efforts of two men culminating in one battle. As Matthew Ward argues, the success of the British Conquest in fact hinged more on the safe arrival of the British relief fleet in May 1760. After the Plains of Abraham, the French had regrouped in Montreal under the command of François Gaston de Lévis, leaving the under-supplied British to endure a harsh Canadian winter in a city they had already destroyed. Following the battle, on 18 September 1759, the Articles of Capitulation of Quebec was signed between British and French authorities.

In April 1760, in a final effort to reclaim Quebec City, the French army (now based in Montreal) launched an assault against the British at Sainte-Foy, just outside the walls of Quebec City. The battle, in sheer casualties, represented a French victory. Ultimately, however, the French were unable to retake Quebec City and were forced to retreat to Montreal.

=== Montreal Campaign ===
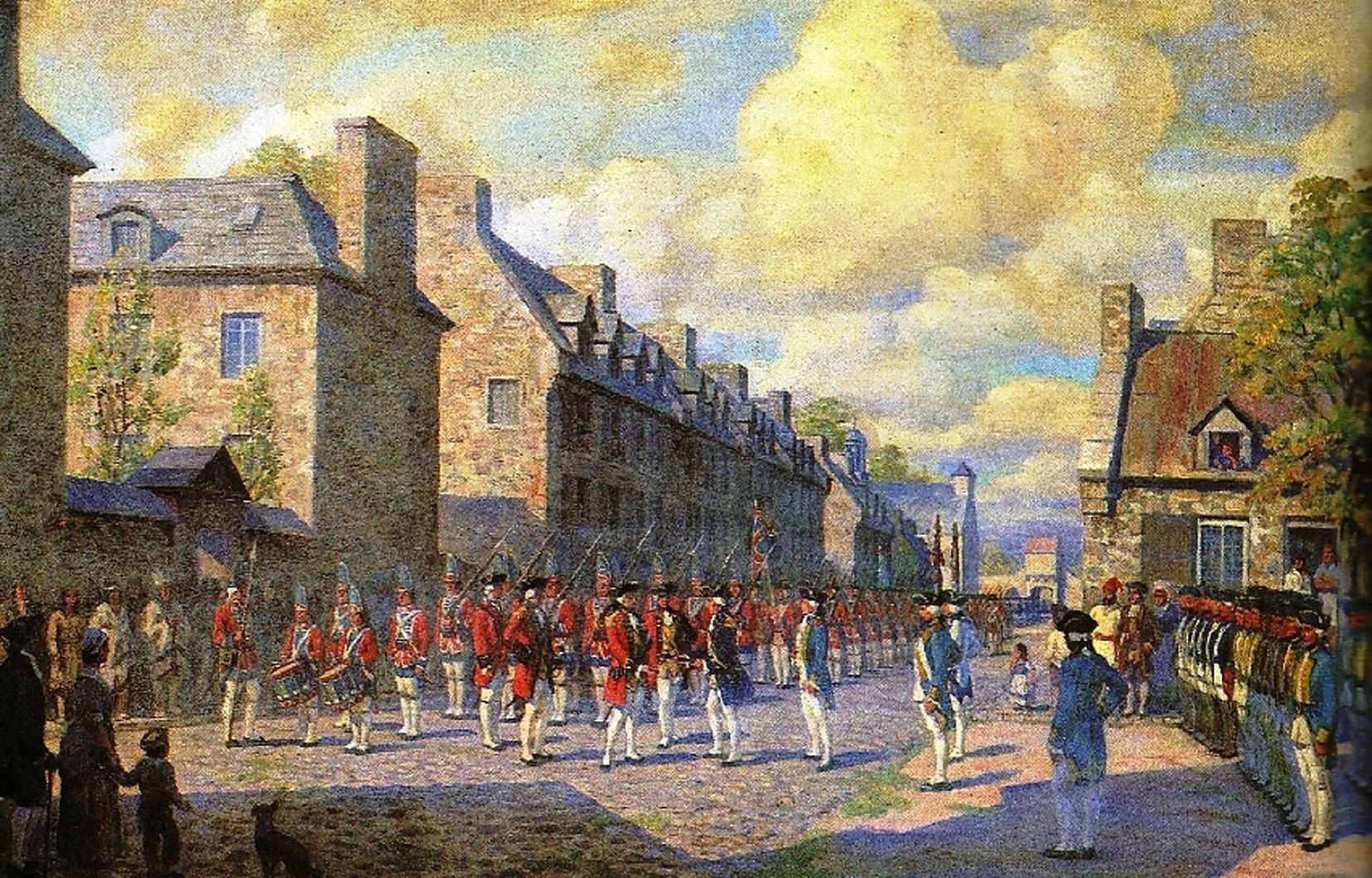
The capitulation of Montreal in September 1760 to British forces under Jeffery Amherst

After the failed siege of Quebec, the British commanders were eager to bring the conquest to a close. In July British forces numbering around 18,000 men under the overall direction of Jeffery Amherst, advanced on Montreal from three separate directions. One under Amherst from Lake Ontario, the other under James Murray from Québec and the third under William Haviland from Fort Crown Point.

The three 'prongs' which lasted nearly two months eliminated all French forts and positions. In addition many Canadians deserted or surrendered their arms to British forces while the native allies of the French sought peace and neutrality. By September 6 all three forces had joined up and surrounded Montreal. Lévis tried to negotiate a surrender with 'Honours of War' but Amherst refused to accept this. Lévis however was overruled by Pierre François de Rigaud, Marquis de Vaudreuil-Cavagnal the French civilian Governor who persuaded him to surrender to avoid another bloodbath.

On 8 September 1760, Lévis and Vaudreuil surrendered the entire French colony of Canada. Thus, with the capitulation of Montreal, the British had effectively won the war. The details of the conquest, however, still had to be sorted out between Great Britain and France. As such, the region was put under a military regime while awaiting the results in Europe. During this time, in line with the Old World's "rules of war", Britain assured the 60,000 to 70,000 Francophone inhabitants freedom from deportation and from confiscation of property, freedom of religion, the right to migrate to France, and equal treatment in the fur trade.

== Treaty of Paris – 1763 ==
The final details were worked out between British and French diplomats in Europe, an ocean apart from the actual battlefields. In February 1763, the Treaty of Paris made the northern portion of New France (including Canada and some additional lands to the south and west) officially from a French colony to a British colony. Ultimately, Canada was transferred over to the British without much French protest. As I.K. Steele points out, the conquest of Canada was only one part of the Seven Years' War, and France was willing to surrender Canada peacefully in exchange for their more profitable colonies in the West Indies, particularly Guadeloupe. In addition, the deal struck between France and Great Britain allowed France to retain the islands of St. Pierre and Miquelon off the coast of Newfoundland, securing their access to the lucrative Atlantic fisheries.

== Consequences ==
Britain's decision to retain Canada was the result of different strategic priorities. On the one hand, there was a need to appease the French, who – defeat in war notwithstanding – continued to present a major threat to British interests given their demographic advantage. This implied giving up either Canada or the French Caribbean islands. Ultimately, the decision was taken to forfeit the French sugar islands even though they were far more economically significant than the North American French colonies. This was in part because annexing the French Antilles would have been a blow to national pride that the French Monarchy would have been unable to accept, thus hampering the prospect of a rapid and mutually beneficial peace settlement. But more importantly, the retention of Canada was motivated by the argument that removing the French presence from North America would reinforce the security of Britain's Empire in the region.

=== Quebec Act ===
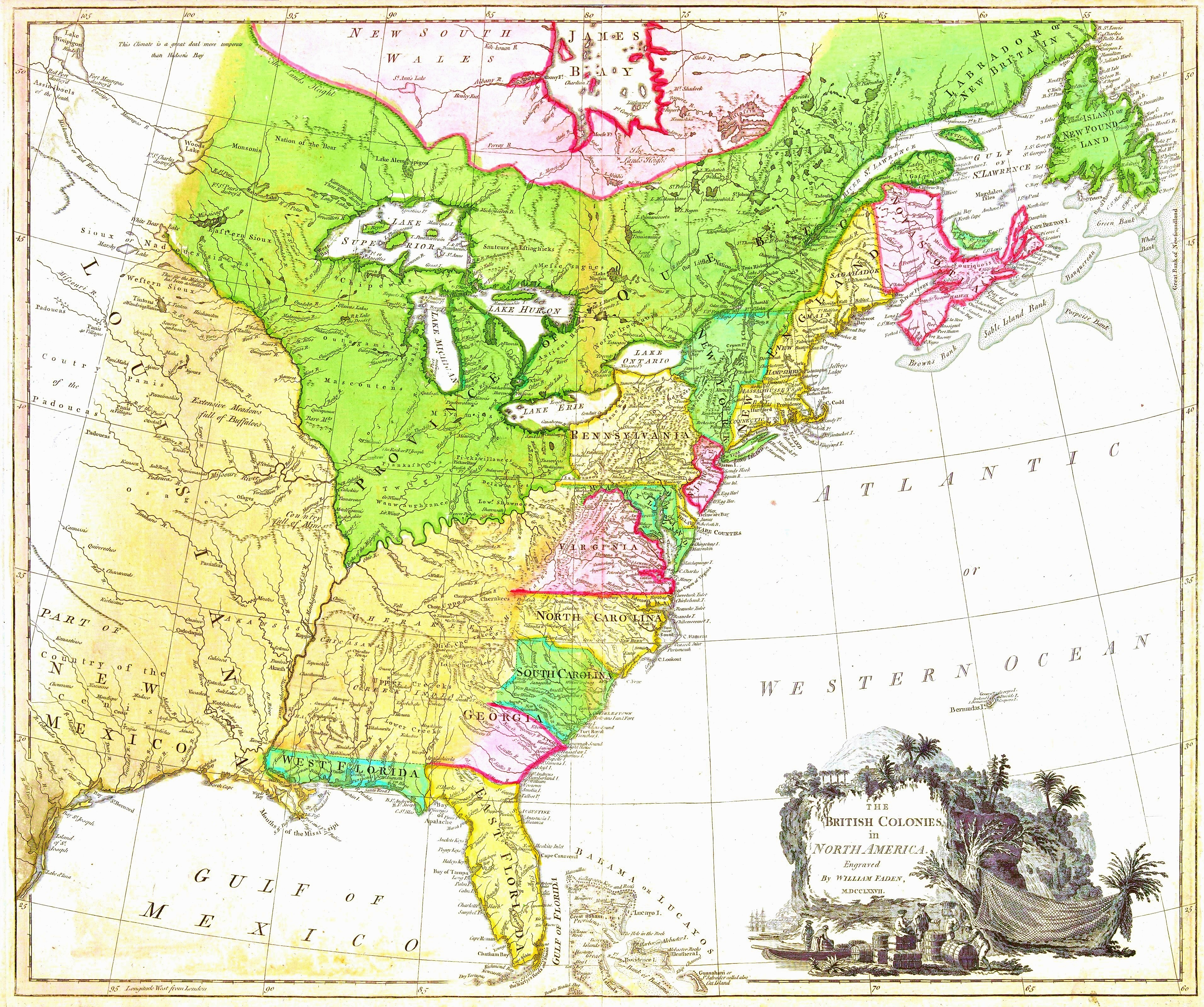
Map of British America after 1763. The Quebec Act saw the expansion of the Province of Quebec's borders to include a significant portion of the Indian Reserve.

The Quebec Act was voted in the Commons on 15 June 1774. It extended the frontier of the colony, giving control over the region exploited by Montreal fur traders to the Province of Quebec, it endowed Canadiens with freedom of worship and confirmed the continuance of the Coutume de Paris in Civil law and English practice in criminal law. It also abandoned the commitment to calling a legislative assembly, a belated recognition that the Irish model had failed in Quebec.

=== Mutual adaptations ===
The consequences of the change of imperial regime are described by Donald Fyson as a system of mutual adaptations. His conception of the relationship between the conquered and the conqueror implies that one must to do away with the idea that, as British identity and the English language came to underpin the mode of governance, the legislative, administrative and judicial branches of the old legal and social order collapsed and the Canadiens population was too passive to actively participate in this transformation for better or for worse. Instead, everyday practices and structures highlight the practical and utilitarian nature of the mutual adjustments that occurred between colonial administrators, British civilian population and Canadien inhabitants.

==== Religious adaptation ====
A first example of mutual adaptation is the status of Catholics within the legal framework of the colony. Official policy following the incorporation of the first civil government of Quebec in 1763 mandated the imposition of all penal acts that formed the public law of Britain, including the 1558 Act of Supremacy which barred Catholics from holding remunerated government positions. This exclusionary sentiment is echoed in the Quebec grand jury presentment of October 1764, which objected to the presence of Catholic Jurors as an "open Violation of our most sacred Laws and Libertys, and tending to the utter subversion of the protestant Religion and his Majesty's power authority, right, and possession of the province to which we belong." However, beyond this seemingly rigid religious ideology, the judicial framework presented ambiguities that permitted Governor Murray to make exceptions to accommodate practical realities. Nuanced language in the framing of the October 1764 presentment, which only excluded "papist[s] or popish recusant convict[s]" and not papists in general, provided colonial administrators the leeway to account for the administrative necessities of running a country populated in majority by a foreign ethnic group. Indeed, the limited number of Protestant males in the colony (they numbered 200 in 1763 and crept to no more than 700 by 1775) meant that Carleton, and Murray before him, had to look elsewhere to staff the state apparatus, and the only available pool was the Canadien population. The shifting legal definition of Catholicism in the Province of Quebec represents not an instance of British cultural domination and paternal enforcement, but rather a propensity for mutual adaptation in the face of regional circumstances and challenges.

==== Political adaptation ====
The political dimension of the colony under early British rule is also revelatory of a series of intertwined adaptive processes. Indeed, not only did the Canadiens have to adapt to unfamiliar power dynamics, but the British officials and civilian population were also forced to adjust in order to acclimate to new constructs of governance. At the macro level, authoritarian political structures were retained under both the military regime and civil government. Murray presided over a "paternalistic, intrusive and controlling government," which was in many ways reminiscent of the French regime. In this arrangement, it was incumbent upon the British civilian population to adapt to an unusual lack of parliamentary institutions. So, for example, many conflicts erupted between British merchants and colonial administrators, explaining in part why many of the former came to support American revolutionaries in 1775–1776.

==== Colonial space ====
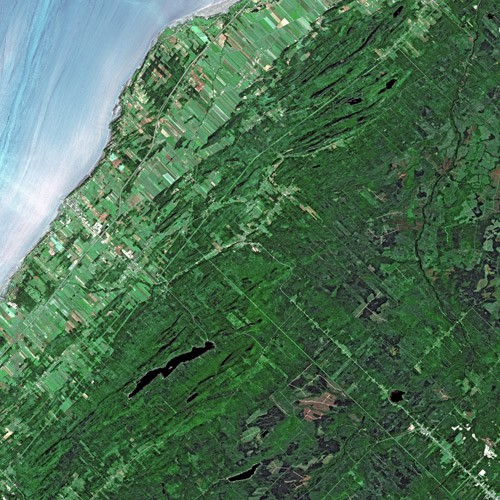
Satellite view of the St. Lawrence River and surrounding farmland. Rather than reorganise the properties of New France to a more traditional British set-up, the British adopted the seigneurial system of New France.

The continued use of French structures ran deeper than this flavour of authoritarianism: it also included a spatial and symbolic dimension. Rather than reorganise the division of property into the traditional English township, the British made do with the existing organisation of land. The continued use of the French-Canadian parish as the basis of the administrative spatial conception of the colony's territory illustrates British adaptation to existing modes of land-ownership instead of imposing their own. Spatiality and political symbolism were also integral to the decision to continue using previously French loci of power. So, for example, the Chateau St-Louis, the Jesuit college and the Recollet church preserved their administrative functions under British rule. This was particularly disconcerting for British civilians who found themselves being tried in Catholic buildings.

=== Economic effects ===
The economic outcome of the Conquest of New France is best understood within the larger context of the imperial economic structures in which it participated and thus in relation to the events and economic imperatives of the metropoles of France and Great-Britain. At the close of the Seven Years' War, both belligerents faced widely divergent economic outcomes.

==== Impact on the British economy ====
During the war, British territorial expansion and naval hegemony had proven a great boon for maritime commerce as well as for internal production. Military expenditure – and in particular spending on naval construction and armament – fuelled a burgeoning metal-working sector. There was also an expansion of the British textile industry, with the purchase of uniforms serving as catalyst. Overall, during the war, exports went up fourteen per cent and imports, eight per cent. The return to peace brought two decades of quasi-depression. The government had contracted important sums in debt in order to wage war, and annual spending rose from a peacetime low of £6–7 million to a high of £21 million during the conflict. The economic irrelevance of the war was compounded by the fact that the territory won in North America (i.e. Canada) was only valuable in that it provided security for the other British colonies in the Americas, its most important trade – the fur-pelt – having crumbled due to the recent conflicts, including Pontiac's War. This fact, combined with the failure of the Irish solution for populating Quebec left the British with few options to alleviate their outstanding war debts except by raising taxes on its other colonies. The series of taxation methods implemented in the wake of the Seven Years' War participated in the mounting frustrations that climaxed in the American Revolution. Furthermore, it can also be concluded that the absorption of Quebec directly contributed to the frustrations that boiled over in the American Revolution because it removed the reason for blocking the westward expansion of the thirteen colonies – i.e. the French threat. Indeed, without a basis for stopping western settlement that was acceptable to the colonies, the British decision to call western territories 'Indian land' frustrated colonial expectations of expansionism and gave legitimacy to complaints of metropolitan despotism. In brief, the war of Conquest and by extension the Seven Years' War proved unprofitable to the British, bringing little economic reward and instead precipitating the dislocation of a profitable portion of the empire.

==== Impact on the French economy ====
The French situation was quite the opposite. During the war, the French Atlantic commerce suffered due to reduced trade with its Caribbean colonies: exports dropped by 75 per cent and imports dropped by 83 per cent. French industry did not profit so radically from wartime expenditure, in part because its members failed to impose themselves as contenders on the high seas, but also because they did not have the same level of economic infrastructure as the British to begin with. The 1763 Treaty of Paris confirmed the British possession of the province of Quebec and the French retention of Caribbean colonies and Newfoundland fisheries. This arrangement explains why defeat was of little to no economic consequence to the French state: it had managed to rid itself of territory it had long considered excess weight, while holding on to the parts of the empire that were central to its commercial prosperity. Furthermore, given the lull in French economic activity that took place during the war, the return to peace meant a revival of French trade. The year following the peace agreement saw sugar production from the Caribbean surpass the 1753 high of 46 million livres, to 63 million livres. By 1770, the sugar trade was yielding 89 million livres; by 1777, it accounted for 155 million livres.

==== Impact on the Canadian economy ====
As for the local economic consequences, it was established by Fernand Ouellet that once the direct damage of warfare was addressed, economic fallout was minimal. In fact, the outcome of British conquest was manifestly positive on the economic front. For example, the conquest of Canada formed the genesis of a logging trade that was non existent during the French regime. From 6000 barrels of pine per year, the colony under British dominion increased production to 64,000 barrels by 1809. Furthermore, the British encouraged the immigration prerequisite to the economic expansion of Canada during the 19th century. Indeed, in 1769, Canadian exports were valued at 127,000 pounds sterling, and by 1850 they had grown to 2,800,000 pounds sterling.

== Historiography and memory ==
The conquest is a central and contested theme of Canadian memory. Historical opinion remains divided over the ultimate legacy of the conquest, particularly in Quebec. Much of the contention is between those that see it as having negative economic and political consequences for Quebec and French Canadians and those that see the conquest as positive and integral to the survival of Quebec in North America. Much of the historiographical debate surrounding the conquest is linked to the rise of Quebec nationalism and new schools of thought developed at the time of the Quiet Revolution.

The Quebec school of history, originated from Université Laval in Quebec City, posits that the conquest was ultimately essential to the survival and growth of Quebec. The Laval school includes those Francophone historians such as Fernand Ouellet and Jean Hamelin who see the positive benefit of the conquest as enabling the preservation of language, and religion and traditional customs under British rule in a hostile North America. They argue that the conquest exposed the Canadiens to constitutional government and parliamentary democracy and with the Quebec Act, guaranteed the survival of French customs in an otherwise Anglo-Protestant continent. Scholars such as Donald Fyson have pointed to the Quebec legal system as a particular success, with the continuation of French civil law and the introduction of liberal modernity.

The Montreal school, originating at the Université de Montréal and including historians such as Michel Brunet, Maurice Séguin, and Guy Frégault, posits that the conquest is responsible for the economic and political retardation of Quebec. These historians tried to explain the economic inferiority of the French Canadians by arguing that the conquest "destroyed an integral society and decapitated the commercial class; leadership of the conquered people fell to the Church; and, because commercial activity came to be monopolized by British merchants, national survival concentrated on agriculture."

A major figure of the Montreal school was the nationalist priest and historian Lionel Groulx. Groulx promoted the view that the conquest began a long legacy of underdevelopment and discrimination. It was only the tenacity of the Canadiens in opposition to the alien rule of the British, Groulx argued, that had helped the French Canadians survive in a hostile North America.

Before the growth of modern Quebec nationalism, much of elite opinion saw the conquest as positive. For example, one Canadien politician and future Father of Confederation, Étienne-Paschal Taché, stated that "The last cannon which is shot on this continent in defence of Great Britain will be fired by the hand of a French Canadian." French–Canadian debates have escalated since the 1960s, as the conquest is seen as a pivotal moment in the history of Quebec nationalism. Even the "pro-Conquest" Laval school is part of the larger trend of renewed Quebec scholarship during the Quiet Revolution. Historian Jocelyn Létourneau suggested in the 21st century, "1759 does not belong primarily to a past that we might wish to study and understand, but, rather, to a present and a future that we might wish to shape and control."

== See also ==
- Military history of the Acadians
- Military history of Canada
- Second Hundred Years' War
- Seven Years' War § North America
