= Montresor (surname) =

Montresor is a surname, and may refer to:

- Adelaide Montresor, née Adelaide Malanotte (1785–1832), Italian opera singer
- Beni Montresor (1926–2001), Italian artist and illustrator
- Frederick Montresor (1811–1887), British admiral
- Henry Montresor (1767–1837), British army general
- James Gabriel Montresor (1704–1776), British military engineer
- John Montresor (1736–1799), British military engineer and cartographer
- Maxminio Montresor (born 1980), Brazilian football goalkeeper
