= Old Stone Chimney =

Coordinates: 43°4′44″N 79°2′43″W

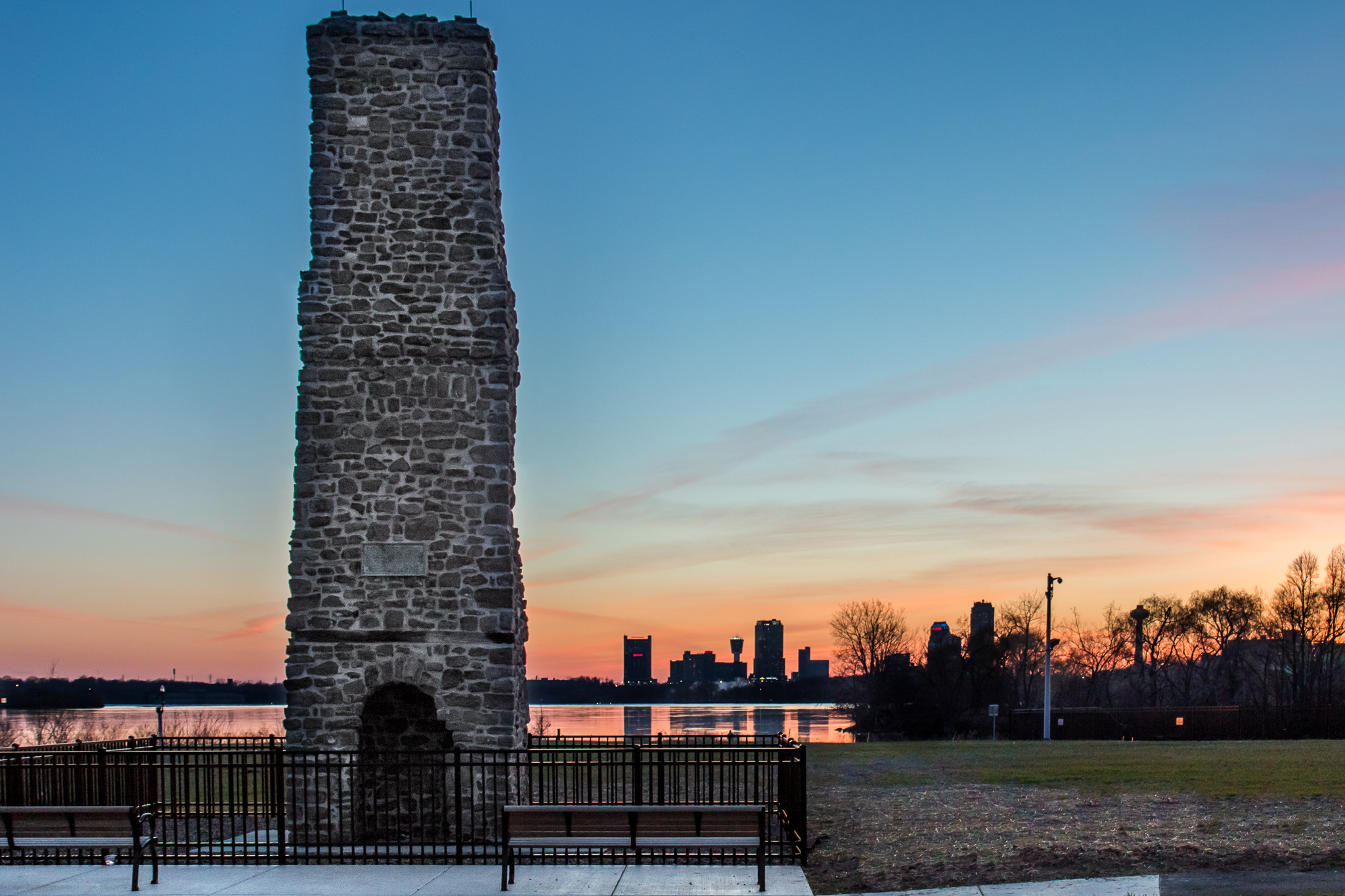
The Old Stone Chimney, at the upper landing of the ancient Niagara Portage in present Niagara Falls, NY. The skyline of the city of Niagara Falls, Canada can be seen in the background, as well as mists rising from the Falls themselves.

The Old Stone Chimney is located in the city of Niagara Falls, New York. It is a masonry chimney built as part of a two-story barracks on the site of the French "Fort du Portage," or "Fort Little Niagara," by Daniel Joncaire in 1750, when the Niagara River and its shores were part of New France on the North American continent.

The Old Stone Chimney, constructed with two functioning hearths and flues, provided heat and a cooking fire for a two-story barracks. After the French and Indian War, it was repurposed several times by British and American military and commercial interests. Relocated three times (1902, 1942, and 2015) after it was retired from its intended purpose, the Old Stone Chimney is currently located between the Niagara River and the Niagara Scenic Parkway east of the Adams Slip along the bike path. Previously located in the former Porter Park on Buffalo Avenue, at the foot of 10th Street along an embankment of the then- Robert Moses Parkway, close to the exit ramp to John B. Daly Boulevard. The Old Stone Chimney is 31 feet tall and weighs approximately 60 tons.

The site marks the Upper Landing of the Niagara Portage, one of the oldest Native American trails in the Great Lakes Region. The Niagara Portage is a crucial economic fulcrum of continental significance. Not long after the end of the last ice age, some 12,000 years ago, indigenous peoples began navigating the Great Lakes from Lake Ontario to Lake Erie. People of the First Nations carried their goods and vessels around the impassable Falls of Niagara, establishing a trail approximately seven miles long through the primeval forest. This trail begins near the foot of the Silurian-era Niagara Escarpment in present Lewiston, New York, on the eastern shore of the Niagara River, opposite present-day Queenston, Ontario. A natural drainage gulley provides an ideal landing place for canoes, which were then carried up the 250-foot face of the Escarpment. The trail then followed the rim of the Niagara Gorge to Devil's Hole, before skewing south to the upper Niagara River approximately one mile above Niagara Falls. The Upper and Lower Landings provided default resting and meeting places for hunters, traders, travelers, and adventurers for millennia.

== Fort du Portage / Fort Little Niagara ==
Fort Little Niagara, built above the Falls of Niagara by French traders and military men, was a satellite of Fort Niagara. Fort Niagara protected the mouth of the Niagara River at Lake Ontario and the approach to the Lower Landing (below the Falls). Fort Little Niagara anchored the Upper Landing (above the Falls). In 1678, René-Robert Cavelier, Sieur de La Salle claimed the Niagara Frontier and Great Lakes region for New France. French explorers sought to connect settlements at Montreal and New Orleans with the necessary links and posts to secure their superiority in the Fur Trade throughout the Great Lakes, to the Mississippi watershed and River, and south to the Gulf of Mexico. At the time, the French Crown considered Niagara the third-most important site in North America over which to maintain control.

Built by Daniel Joncaire in 1750 at the southern terminus of the Niagara Portage, the French utilized the Chimney and the rest of the fort for nearly a decade. Abandoning the fort to reinforce troops at Fort Niagara, Joncaire burned the barracks and destroyed Little Niagara (and partially-built ships at Burt Ship Creek) in July 1759 as British forces under the command of John Prideaux (British Army officer) lay siege in the French and Indian War. The Old Stone Chimney survived this fire. British forces claimed victory at Fort Niagara in July 1759. The Portage and its forts also reverted to British control.

== Fort Schlosser ==
Before, during, and after the American Revolution and signing of the Jay Treaty, British forces developed a European presence and function at the Upper Landing until 1796. Fort Little Niagara what was rebuilt as Fort Schlosser, and named for the first (though temporary) commanding officer, Captain Joseph Schlosser. Portage Master Johnathan Stedman succeeded Schlosser, and lived in a house which utilized the Chimney from 1763 until the end of the British era. The British made improvements to the infrastructure of the Portage, including the construction of an incline tramway at the Niagara Escarpment and ox-pulled carts to relay cargo. The utilization of these improvements disengaged native Seneca Indians, previously employed by the French. This led to the Devil's Hole Massacre on September 14, 1763, considered part of the Pontiac Rebellion. Stedman was part of the British company and survived the massacre, escaping on horseback along Gill Creek. He returned to his home on the bank of the Niagara River and the reassuring stability of its massive hearth.

== Private ownership ==
Augustus Porter, one of Niagara's prominent early settlers, occupied the Stedman House from 1806 to 1808, while he built an appropriate family home overlooking the Niagara Rapids almost a mile downriver. Enos Broughton opened a tavern at the former Stedman house in 1809. This tavern was leased to American military forces as hostilities escalated prior to the War of 1812. Along with most structures along the Niagara Frontier, the former Stedman/Porter home was burned by the British in December 1813. This was in retaliation for the burning of Newark (now Niagara-On-The-Lake), Ontario earlier that month. Again, the Old Stone Chimney survived.

In 1818 or 1819, the Old Stone Chimney was re-purposed when tavern keeper Epaphroditus Emmons built an inn around it. He operated the tavern with his wife, Laura (nee Hopkins) and their large family. By 1826, the Niagara Portage was made obsolete by the completion of the Erie Canal. Emmons had since moved his inn to another location. In 1840, the Chimney and Old Stedman Farm parcel were transferred to General Peter B. Porter (Augustus' brother and business partner). Porter had modifications made to the structure, which served as a home for other members of the Porter family, and possibly as a guest house. While it is uncertain how many years this building was in active use by the Porter family, this structure remained standing until it was torn down in 1889, leaving the Old Stone Chimney extant once again.

== Public domain ==
After the death of Col. Peter A. Porter at the Battle of Cold Harbor, the Old Stedman Farm parcel passed to General Porter's grandson, the Hon. Peter A. Porter. In 1890, Porter sold this and other parcels to the Niagara Falls Power Company for infrastructure both above- and below-ground. In selling the former Stedman Farm, however, Porter retained ownership of the Old Stone Chimney, and the first public efforts to "save" it began. The increasing availability of hydroelectric power delivered by alternating current (developed at Niagara by Nikola Tesla in the 1890s), made properties near the Falls and its power plants among the most desirable in the world. Industrialists seemed poised to build on every square inch of land close to Niagara. The Hon. Peter A. Porter not only hailed from the area's most esteemed family, he had established himself as a publisher, author, politician, historian, and philanthropist. Porter was in a unique position to champion an historic preservation effort. He had grown up hearing first-hand accounts from soldiers, statesmen, tradesmen, explorers, adventurers, and captains of industry. Porter worked strategically to popularize the history, lore, and culture of the old relic while writing many articles, booklets, and volumes about the Niagara Frontier's pioneer days. His 1891 campaign even included popularization of a song written by Niagara Falls historian Thomas Vincent Welch, a personal friend of Theodore Roosevelt and published by Denton, Cottier & Daniels of Buffalo. Works of visual art were also commissioned. Public awareness and popularity grew to the point that the Niagara Falls Power Company agreed to finance the painstaking process of carefully de- and then re-constructing the structure.

In 1902, the stones of the Chimney were marked and carefully moved, under the watchful eye of C. Breckenridge Porter, great-grandson of Peter Buell Porter. However, for reasons unknown, it was only moved about 150 feet to the east. No mind was paid to public access or how it would contribute to the site's built environment. In 1895, a new abrasives company founded by chemist Edward Acheson moved to Niagara Falls from Pennsylvania. The Carborundum Company began building on the old Stedman Farm site. Forty years later, rapid wartime (WWII) expansion of the complex once again placed the Old Stone Chimney in harm's way. It was moved again in 1942, again each stone numbered and replaced precisely, and reconstructed in a new Porter Park, the visible elements of which faintly remain on the south side of Buffalo Avenue at 10th Street. The work was supervised carefully by local historian Edward T. Williams, the mentee of Hon. Peter A. Porter. This time, the structure was placed in the public eye, where visitors could understand it in the context of the Niagara Portage and River. This time, the considerable cost to move the Chimney was paid by the Niagara Falls Power Company and Carborundum Company.

The bronze plaque which still appears on the front of the Old Stone Chimney was placed with great fanfare on June 15, 1915. While the public institution of "landmarking" wasn't established until the 1980s, this well-documented act permanently establishing the OSC as a "landmark" of the highest significance to the three nations it served and the Niagara Region. It is named in Peter A. Porter's "Landmarks of the Niagara Frontier." Frederick Lovelace, Executive Secretary of the NFPC, delivered the keynote address, in which he remarked that the Niagara Falls Power Company would always care for and look after this masonry witness to history and its active contributions to a great nation.

Completion of the first section of New York State’s Robert Moses Parkway in 1962 did not provide for relocation of the Chimney, but rather built an elevated highway on a miles-long spoils pile of stone fill, material recovered from the tunnels and reservoir required for the Niagara Power Project. The Chimney was cut off from public access, nestled in the berm of an exit ramp and on the far side of an industrial parking lot. In the 2000s, a plan to reconfigure the Parkway began to move forward, which proposed removing the Old Stone Chimney and placing it in storage crates at an unspecified location for an undefined period of time. After 50 years of neglect, public knowledge, interest, and memory of the Old Stone Chimney was all but lost. In 2011, the Historic Preservation Commission of the City of Niagara Falls launched an exploratory inquiry, which determined in February, 2012 that estimates to move the Chimney were cost-prohibitive.

In 2012, a grassroots effort to organize public support for appropriate preservation of the Old Stone Chimney was begun by the Niagara Portage Old Guard, a newly-formed, community-based, volunteer historic preservation effort. NPOG did hundreds of hours of research into old volumes and databases, met with community stakeholders and officials at city, state, and federal levels. Several state agencies had a stake in the eventual outcome. NPOG members held public forums and spoke at numerous community groups throughout Western New York. They provided presence at numerous events, educating people and sharing the stories of the OSC. NPOG submitted a local landmark application to the Historic Preservation Commission and Niagara Falls City Council. The application was met with a response of "sovereign immunity" from NYPA, as the OSC occupied land owned by NYPA. Meetings with NYPA officials intensified while NPOG continued pursue its mission and plan. Months into brokering unsolicited ideas and proposals from an increasing number of stakeholders, a 1990s decision disqualifying the Chimney from state landmark consideration was reversed by the State Historic Preservation Office. Among the previously-undocumented points of information was the appearance of an "Old French Landing" on Olmsted and Vaux's 1895 Niagara Greensway Plan. Frederick Law Olmsted included the story of the Old Stone Chimney in the plans for what is now the oldest State Park in the United States. Further, an 1892 article from the Niagara Gazette discussed Olmsted's plan to move the Old Stone Chimney onto the Niagara Reservation, advocating for its de- and reconstruction. Other evidence gathered by NPOG showed that the decision to deny eligibility was made without full knowledge of this or other considerations and circumstances. The public conversation began to change at a fundamental level. The dynamic swayed from a group of passionate volunteers petitioning a State Authority to two well-established departments within New York State, each now requiring a fresh perspective and understanding. Around this same time, NPOG researchers scrutinized Frederick Lovelace's 1915 address more closely, in which the full resources of the Niagara Falls Power Company were assured to enshrine Niagara's stalwart Old Stone Chimney forever. Lovelace's forgotten speech formed a second cornerstone of NPOG's, and therefore SHPO's 2013 argument, compelling the New York Power Authority to act in good faith - 98 years after Lovelace's impassioned pledge.

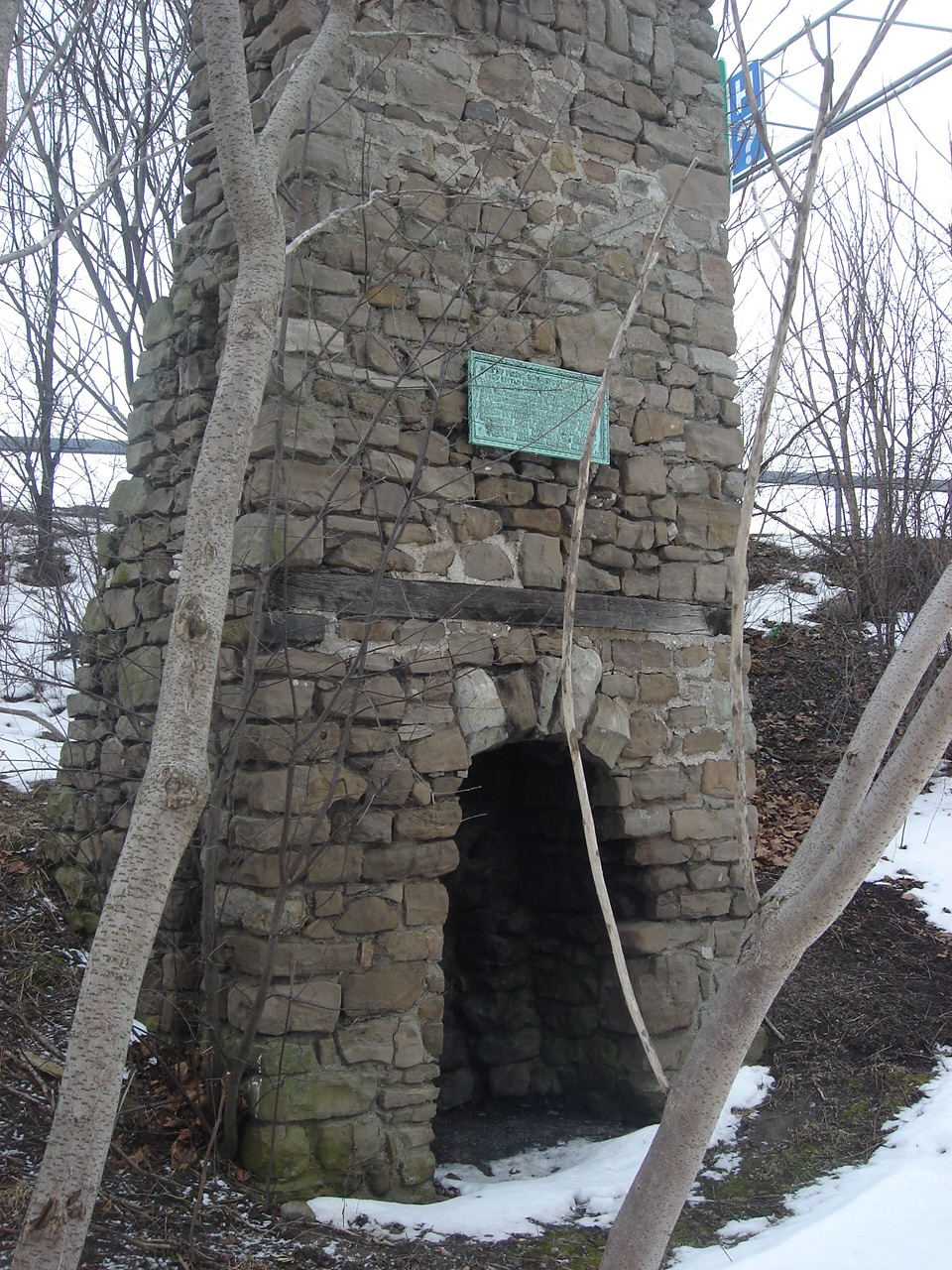
Old Stone Chimney (1750), In its previous location in the former Porter Park Niagara Falls, NY

As of November 2015 The Chimney has been relocated to the river side of the Niagara Scenic Parkway, just east of the Adams Slip. The new site is accessible from the parkway and limited free parking is available. The bike path crosses in front of the Chimney, the Niagara River is within view behind it.
