= Prudente =

Prudente may refer to:

- Prudente de Morais (1841–1902), the third president of Brazil (the first civilian)
- Nemesio Prudente (died 2008), Filipino political activist and university president
- French ship Prudent, including ships named Prudente
- HMS Prudente (1779), one of the ships mentioned above; captured by the British in 1779

== See also ==
- Philip II of Spain, known as Felipe el Prudente ("Philip the Prudent")
