= Montresor =

Montresor may refer to:

== People ==
- Montresor (surname)
- Claude de Bourdeille, comte de Montrésor (c. 1606–1663), French aristocrat

== Other uses ==
- Montresor, character in "The Cask of Amontillado"
- Montresor, the bat ridden by "Iron Tail" in the children's movie Here Comes Peter Cottontail
- Montrésor, a commune in the Indre-et-Loire department in central France
- Château de Montrésor, a medieval castle in that commune
- Randall's Island, called Montresor's Island in the 18th century, an island in the East River in New York City
- Montresor, character in the webtoon Nevermore by Kate Flynn and Kit Trace
