= Battle of Devil's Hole =

1763 battle of Pontiac's Rebellion

Coordinates: 43°8′2″N 79°2′44″W

- Part of Pontiac's Rebellion
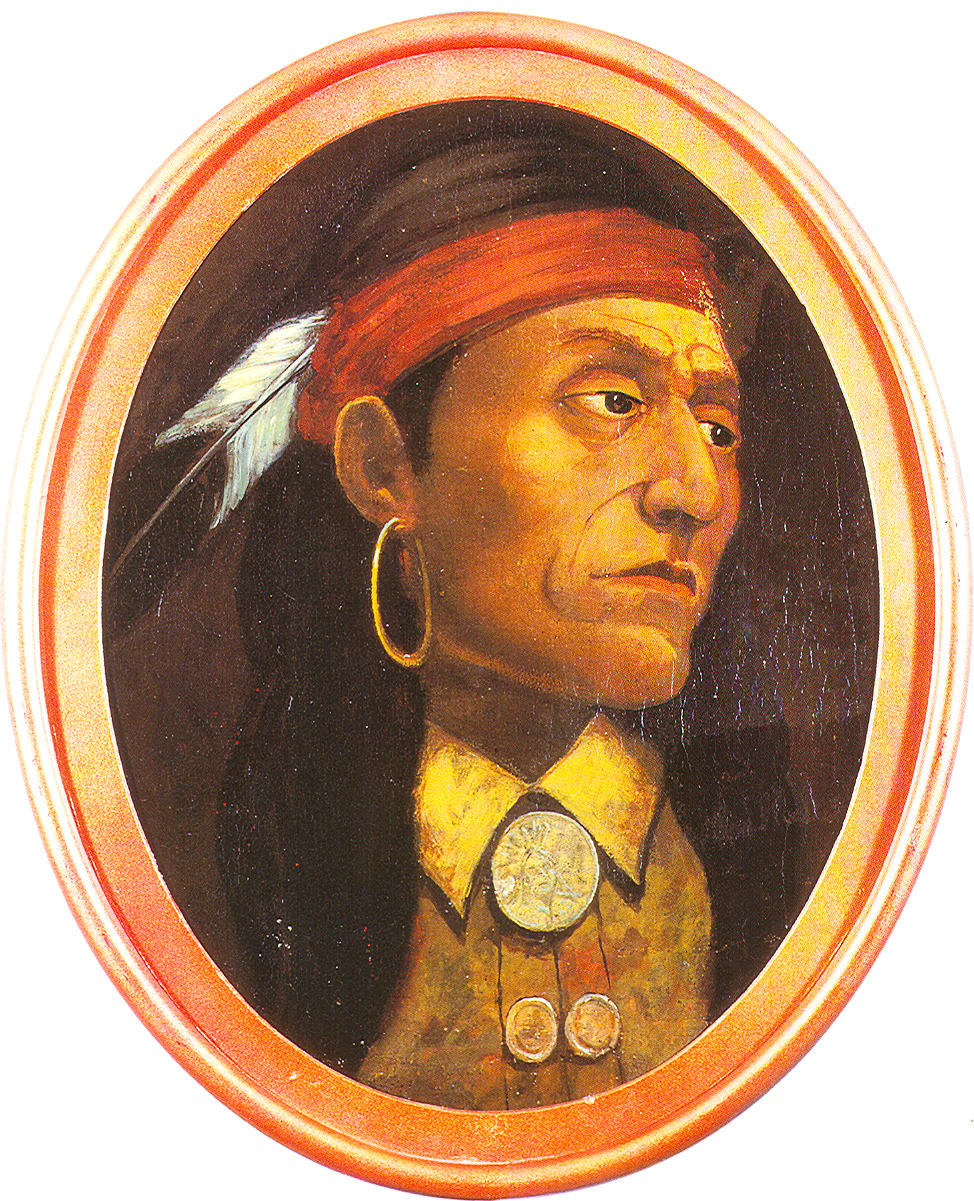
- Chief Pontiac
Date	September 14, 1763
Location	present as near Niagara Gorge
Result	Seneca victory

Belligerents
Haudenosaunee; Seneca nation	Great Britain

Commanders and leaders
Cornplanter; Honayewus; Sayenqueraghta	George Campbell †; William Fraser †; John Stedman

Strength
309	134

Casualties and losses
1 wounded	81 soldiers and 21 teamsters and escort killed, 1 teamster and 8 soldiers wounded

The Battle of Devil's Hole, known to the Anglo-Americans as the Devil's Hole Massacre, was fought on the Niagara Portage at the rim of the Niagara Gorge in present-day New York state on September 14, 1763, between a detachment of the British 80th Regiment of Light Armed Foot and about 300 Seneca warriors during Pontiac's Rebellion (1763–1766). The Seneca warriors killed 81 British soldiers and wounded 8 before the British managed to retreat.

== Background ==
As early as 1757, Seneca in the Niagara Falls area had complained to the French about losing control of the long Niagara Portage route along an area of the Niagara River, which French traders were trying to improve for wagons. They resented the Europeans trying to take over their traditional territory and displace them from their work.

After the Seven Years' War, the British took over this area near the Great Lakes. John Stedman improved the former portage trail so that it could accommodate oxen and wagons, and hired teams and escorts to carry goods through. Formerly up to 300 Seneca men had worked as porters on what they thought of as their portage.

Discontent rose among many Native American tribes in the Great Lakes area, who wanted to expel the colonists in the region before more encroached on their lands. In Pontiac's Rebellion, beginning in 1763, several tribes in the Great Lakes and Northwest area cooperated in establishing a pan-tribal confederation to counter British control of the region. In the New York colony, Sir William Johnson, the Superintendent of Indian Affairs, had long advocated fair treatment of Native Americans but was only partially successful. He wrote, "Our people in general are ill calculated to maintain friendship with the Indians. They despise those in peace whom they fear to meet in war."

== Battle ==
On September 14, 1763, a large Seneca band of an estimated 300–500 warriors ambushed a wagon train and its armed escort en route from Fort Schlosser to Fort Niagara as it passed through Devil's Hole, an area known for its difficult terrain. One part of the trail was in a heavily wooded area with a deep ravine on either side; there the Seneca warriors attacked the wagon train. The escort party and teamsters, led by Porter Master John Stedman, were caught completely by surprise; animals broke into a stampede or were driven into the ravine along with their wagons and drivers. The Seneca moved in to fight at close quarters, making musket fire useless, and only three of the party of 24 (including Stedman) managed to escape to Fort Schlosser for help.

Camped nearby at Lewiston was a detachment of the British Army's 80th Regiment of Light-Armed Foot from Fort Gray. Two companies of the 80th Light-Armed Foot commanded by George Campbell and William Fraser heard the news of the ambush and rushed off to rescue the wagon train. From a brush-covered hill commanding the trail, Seneca warriors attacked the soldiers about one mile from the wagon train. Once the British companies began to retreat, the Seneca moved to cut them off from the fort and killed "more than 80 soldiers." The soldiers suffered a loss of 81 dead and 8 wounded before withdrawing (some sources claim the entire rescue party was killed). The Anglo-Americans called it "The Devil's Hole Massacre". The warrior Dekanandi later told Sir William Johnson that 309 warriors attacked the British and their only loss was one man wounded.

== Aftermath ==
Reinforcements from Fort Schlosser under the command of Major John Wilkins arrived shortly after the second battle, but soon withdrew to the fort, fearing another attack. When they returned several days later, they found the soldiers had been ritually scalped or their bodies thrown into the ravine.

Shortly after the battle, Johnson was told that the attack had been planned by a Seneca chief known as Farmer's Brother, who led a large band that supported Pontiac. The consensus among historians is that the battle was related to the larger rebellion.

Because of the successful Seneca attacks, the British reinforced their position in Niagara, when the Seneca had hoped to drive them away. Eventually Sir William Johnson forced the Seneca to cede land in this area: a strip one mile wide on each side of the Niagara River from Lake Ontario to Lake Erie, called the Mile Reserve, as well as the islands upriver of Niagara Falls. This cut them off from traditional control of the river and portage, which had been a transportation route as well as a source of food and water.

The Seneca long contended to regain control of the river banks. White settlers mostly stayed out of the area until after the conclusion of the American Revolutionary War. Its settlement forced most of the Haudenosaunee as British allies to Canada.

== See also ==
- List of battles won by Indigenous peoples of the Americas
