= Niagara Portage =

Historic portage route around Niagara Falls

The Niagara Portage was a major portage route in the Great Lakes Region of North America that bypassed Niagara Falls. First established by Indigenous peoples, the portage played an important economic role by allowing people and goods to transit between Lake Erie and Lake Ontario via the Niagara River.

The primary trail of the Niagara Portage ran about 7 miles (11 km) along the right (eastern) bank of the Niagara River. The Upper Landing was located about 1.5 mi (2.4 km) above the falls in present-day Niagara Falls, New York. From here the trail cut overland to Devil's Hole, followed the rim of the Niagara Gorge to the edge of the Niagara Escarpment, and descended steeply to the Lower Landing at present-day Lewiston.

The footpath was converted to a wagon road in 1763, along with a gravity railway to shuttle goods down the escarpment. In 1789 the British built a second portage road following the left (western) bank of the river in between Chippawa and Queenston. Both portages fell out of use upon the completion of the Erie and Oswego Canals on the American side in 1825 and 1828, and of the Welland Canal on the Canadian side in 1829. Segments of the original portage routes continue to serve as roads and trails in the 21st century.

== History ==
The Seneca people controlled the Niagara Portage at the time of European colonization.

French colonizers were the first Europeans to establish a presence in the region. The French routinely hired porters from the local Seneca tribe to haul goods along the Niagara Portage, employing as many as 200 people at a time. In 1750, Daniel-Marie Chabert de Joncaire de Clausonne established Fort du Portage (Fort Little Niagara) at the Upper Landing site to defend the critical trade route.

In 1759, during the French and Indian War, the French intentionally burned and abandoned Fort du Portage in anticipation of a British advance that culminated in a British victory at the Battle of Fort Niagara. In 1760, British forces built Fort Schlosser at the site of Fort du Portage in 1760, reusing its old stone chimney.

The French relinquished all claims over the region to the British in the February 1763 Treaty of Paris. The same year, Sir William Johnson oversaw the widening of the Niagara Portage from a footpath into a wagon road. To ease transport down the steep Niagara Escarpment, Captain John Montresor constructed the Niagara Portage Railway, a gravity railway often considered the first railroad in North America.

In combination, the wagon road and portage railway removed the need to hire Seneca porters. In response, and amid the ongoing Pontiac's War, Seneca warriors ambushed the first British wagon train over the portage road in the Battle of Devil's Hole on September 14, 1763. The following year, the British built eleven blockhouses along the portage road for additional security. The British eventually forced the Seneca to cede control of all land within one mile of the Niagara River, known as the Mile Reserve.

In 1783, the United States took control of lands east of the Niagara River, and therefore of the Niagara Portage, following its victory in the American Revolutionary War and the signing of the Treaty of Paris. As a consequence, a group of traders led by Robert Hamilton built a second portage road along the left (western) bank of the river to serve British North American interests. Completed in 1789, the second portage road ran from Chippawa north to Queenston. It became an official government route of Upper Canada in 1791.

In 1813, during the War of 1812, British forced burned Fort Schlosser as well as the corresponding fortification at the Lower Landing of the portage, Fort Gray.

=== Decline ===
The Niagara Portage eventually fell out of use in the late 1820s due to the opening of several navigation canals bypassing Niagara Falls. In 1825, the completion of the Erie Canal allowed traffic to float from Lake Erie to the Hudson River and thereby reach the Atlantic Ocean. The Oswego Canal opened in 1828, connected the Erie Canal to Lake Ontario. And in 1829, the opening of the Welland Canal directly across the Niagara Peninsula negated any remaining need for the Niagara Portage.
