= Portrait of John Montresor =

Painting by John Singleton Copley

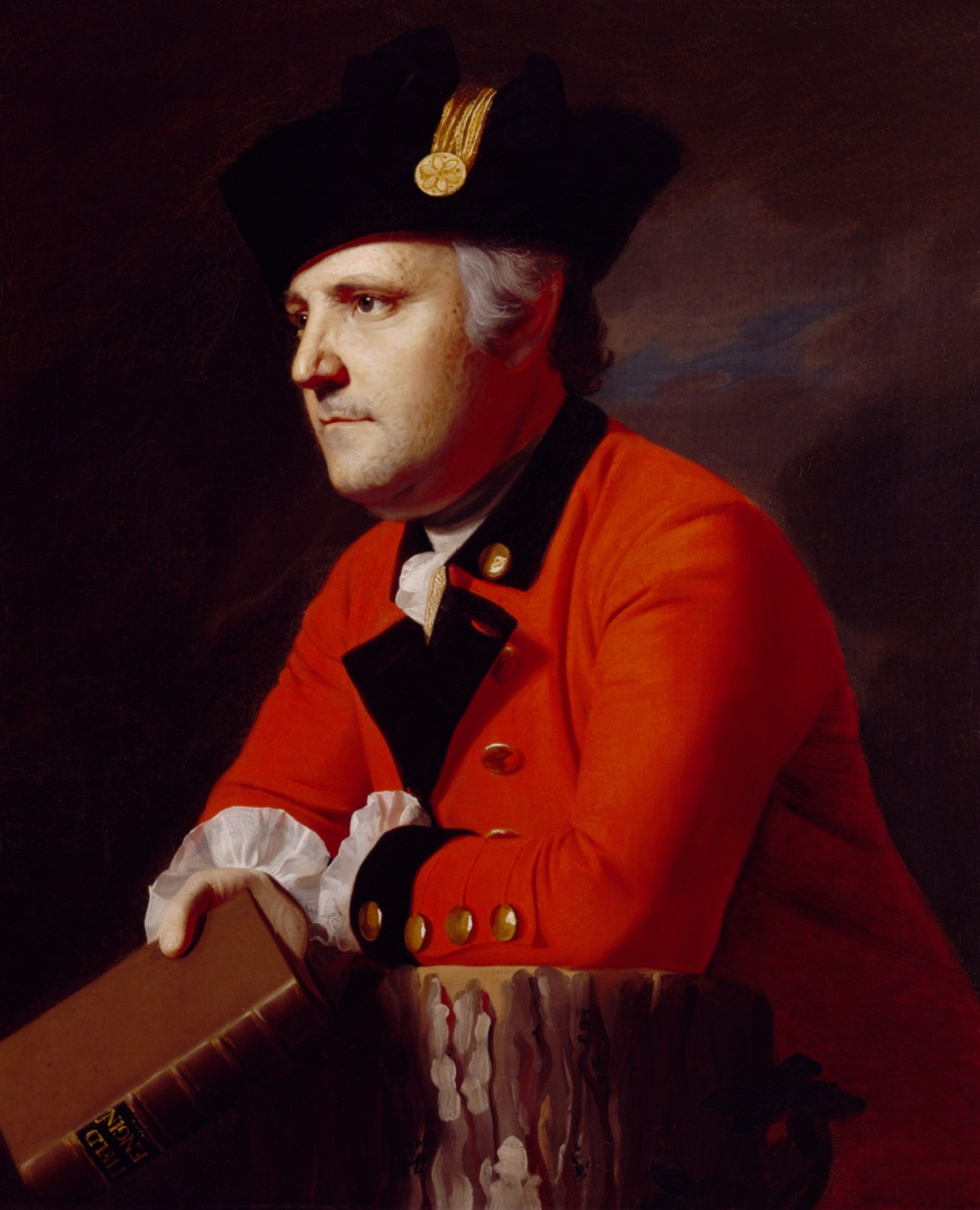
- Artist: John Singleton Copley
- Year: 1771
- Type: Oil on canvas, portrait painting
- Dimensions: 76.2 cm × 63.5 cm (30.0 in × 25.0 in)
- Location: Detroit Institute of Arts; Michigan

Portrait of John Montresor is a 1771 portrait painting by the American artist John Singleton Copley. It depicts the British soldier John Montresor. The Gibraltar-born Montresor was a member of the Royal Engineers, serving as part of the British Army garrison in America. He was also a noted cartographer. He is shown holding a book Field Engineer in a nod to his profession.

It was one around forty works Copley produced during his stay in New York City.The artist relocated to London a few years later where he became known for his large history paintings such as Watson and the Shark and The Death of Major Pierson. The painting has been in the collection of the Detroit Institute of Arts since 1941.

== Bibliography ==
- Barratt, Carrie Rebora . John Singleton Copley in America. John Singleton Copley in America. Metropolitan Museum of Art, 1995.
- Kamensky, Jane. A Revolution in Color: The World of John Singleton Copley. W. W. Norton & Company, 2016.
- Robinson, D.H. The Idea of Europe and the Origins of the American Revolution. Oxford University Press, 2020.
