= British military regime in New France =

British military regime in New France (1759–1764)

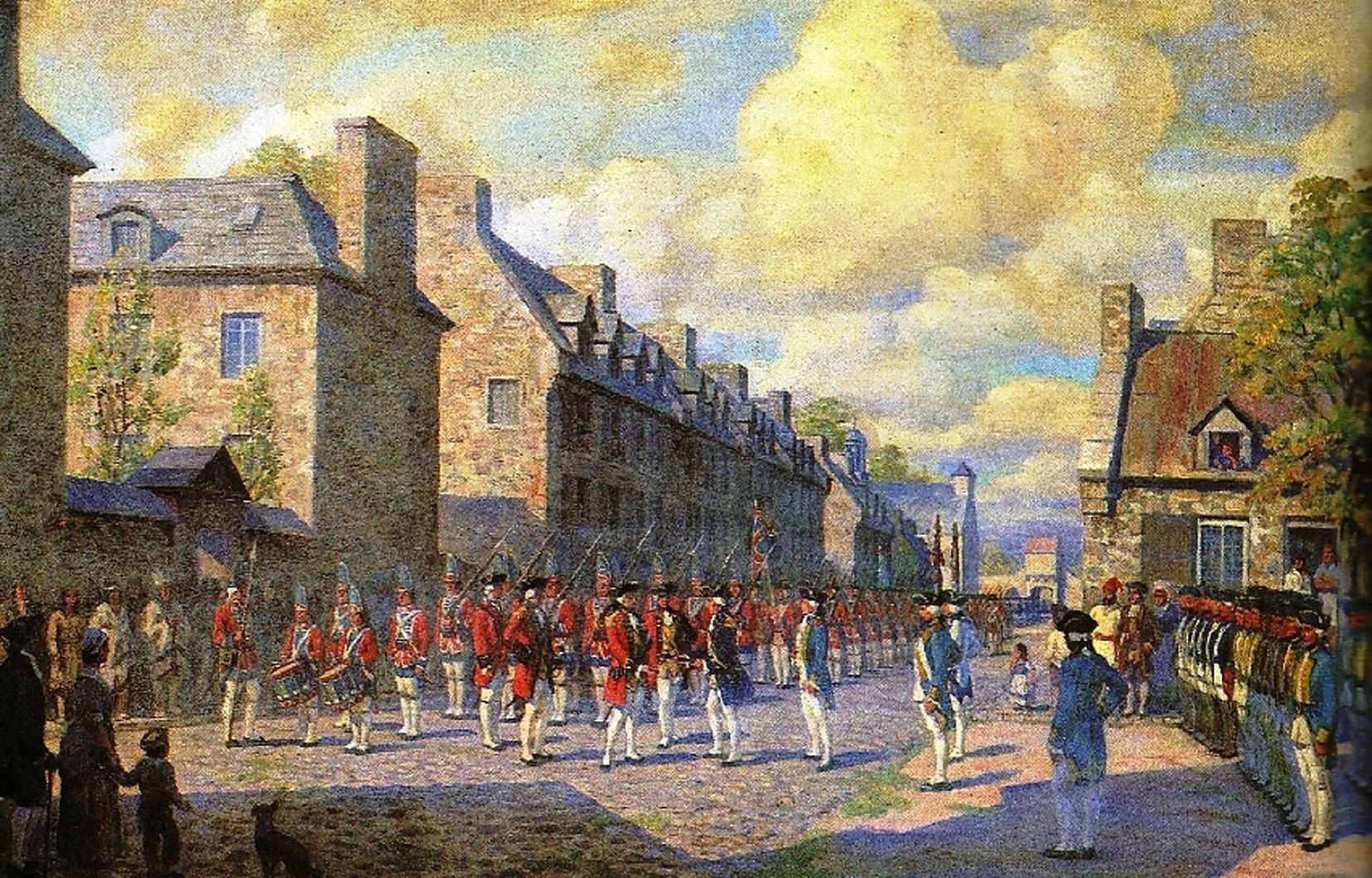
The surrendering of New France to the British, Montreal, 1760.

The British military regime in New France was the British army's military occupation of New France from 1760 to 1763 as part of its Conquest of New France. Between 1760, following the surrender of Montreal, and 1763, when the colonial province of Quebec was created, a temporary military regime administered the colony of Canada.

The military regime officially ended following the enactment of the Treaty of Paris of 1763, which ended the Seven Years' War and created the province of Quebec – a new colony in British America. However, it was not until August 10, 1764, that this military regime was replaced by a civilian regime, because of the 18-month delay allowed by the ratification of the Treaty of Paris.

== Beginning ==
On September 8, 1760, the city of Montreal was surrounded by the British army. In order to avoid a destructive siege like the one the city of Quebec experienced in 1759, the city capitulated. This led the whole of New France to be under the domination of the British military.

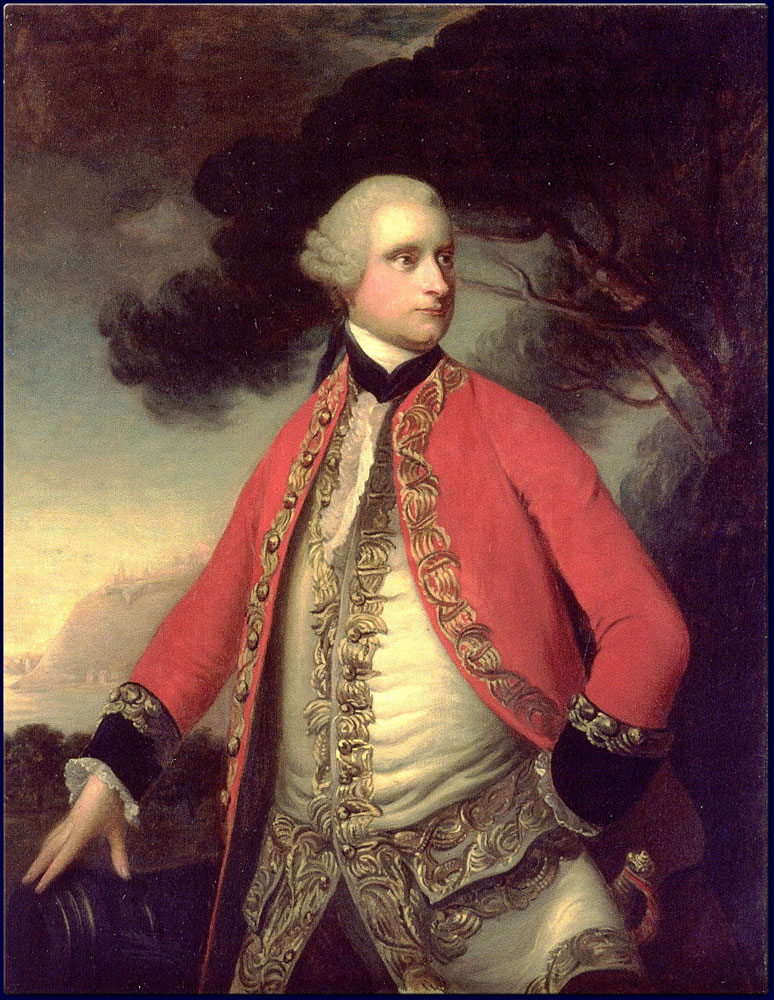
James Murray military governor of the city of Quebec.

Because the Seven Years' War was still raging in Europe, the fate of the colony of Canada and the rest of New France could not be determined yet. As a result, the British authorities established a military regime whose mandate was to govern the colony while awaiting the end of the Seven Years' War. To administer the territory, Great Britain set up temporary institutions and appointed James Murray to the post of military governor of the city of Quebec.

== Living conditions ==
The clauses of the Articles of Capitulation of Montreal negotiated between the governor general of New France Marquis de Vaudreuil and the British major general Jeffery Amherst allowed the inhabitants of New France to retain certain freedoms during the years of military rule. Some of these include: being allowed to retain ownership of their property, being able to continue to practicing Catholicism, the preservation of French civil laws and the continuation of fur trading activities. The population was also given the opportunity to immigrate to France if they so chose, and those who chose to stay could not be deported like the Acadians were during the deportation of the Acadians.

Because the previous six years of war between the French and British armies for control over New France were destructive, many efforts were made by the British during the military regime to rebuild buildings, put fields back into production and bring order to the area.

== End of the Seven Years' War ==
On February 10, 1763, the Treaty of Paris (1763) ended the Seven Years' War. Because of this treaty, New France became a British possession. On October 7, 1763, the Royal Proclamation of 1763 reorganized the territorial division of North America it had newly acquired, thereby creating the Province of Quebec which lasted from 1763 to 1791 and ultimately became Quebec, one of the provinces of the Dominion of Canada.
