= Michel Brunet (historian) =

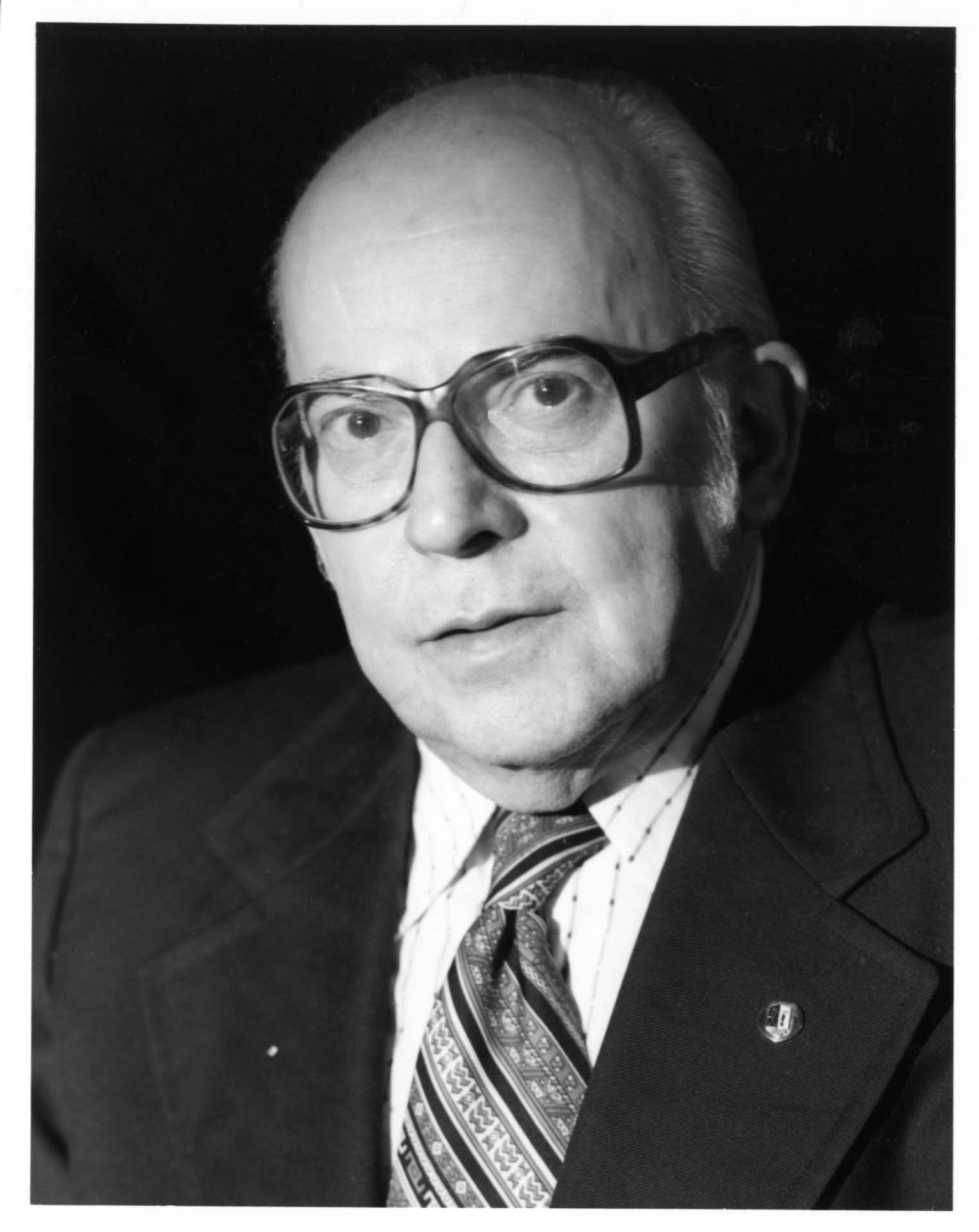
- Brunet in 1983
- Born: July 24, 1917; Montreal, Canada
- Died: September 4, 1985 (aged 68); Montreal, Canada
- Occupations: Historian, essayist

Michel Brunet (July 24, 1917 in Montreal – September 4, 1985 in Montreal) was a Quebec historian and essayist. He received his B.A. and M.A. from the Université de Montréal and received his Ph.D. from Clark University in Worcester, Massachusetts, U.S.A.

He was chair of the history department at the Université de Montréal from 1959 to 1968. Before becoming an academic, he worked for several years as a schoolteacher. Together with fellow Université de Montreal professors Guy Frégault and Maurice Séguin, he formed part of the "Montreal School" of French-Canadian history.

He was also president de l'Institut d'histoire de l'Amérique française for 1970–1971.

== Publications ==
- 1954 - Canadians et Canadiens
- 1958 - La Présence anglaise et les Canadiens
- 1969 - Les Canadiens après la conquête, 1759–1775
- 1975 - Histoire politique, économique et sociale du Québec et des Québécois: le premier centenaire de l'État du Québec
- 1976 - Notre passé, le présent et nous
- 1977 - Analyse de l'efficacité de la Société de développement industriel du Québec

== Honours ==
- 1969 - Prix Jean-Hamelin, Les Canadiens après la conquête, 1759–1775 : de la révolution canadienne à la révolution américaine
- 1969 - Governor General's Award, Les Canadiens après la conquête
- 1970 - Prix France-Québec
- 1970 - Prix Ludger-Duvernay
- 1983 - Prix Léon-Gérin
- Member of the Académie des lettres du Québec.
