= Maurice Séguin =

Canadian historian

Maurice Séguin (7 December 1918 – 28 August 1984) is a Canadian historian who, along with Michel Brunet and Guy Frégault, is credited with creating the Montreal School of Canadian history.
