= Henry Montresor =

British Army general

General Sir Henry Montresor GCH KCB
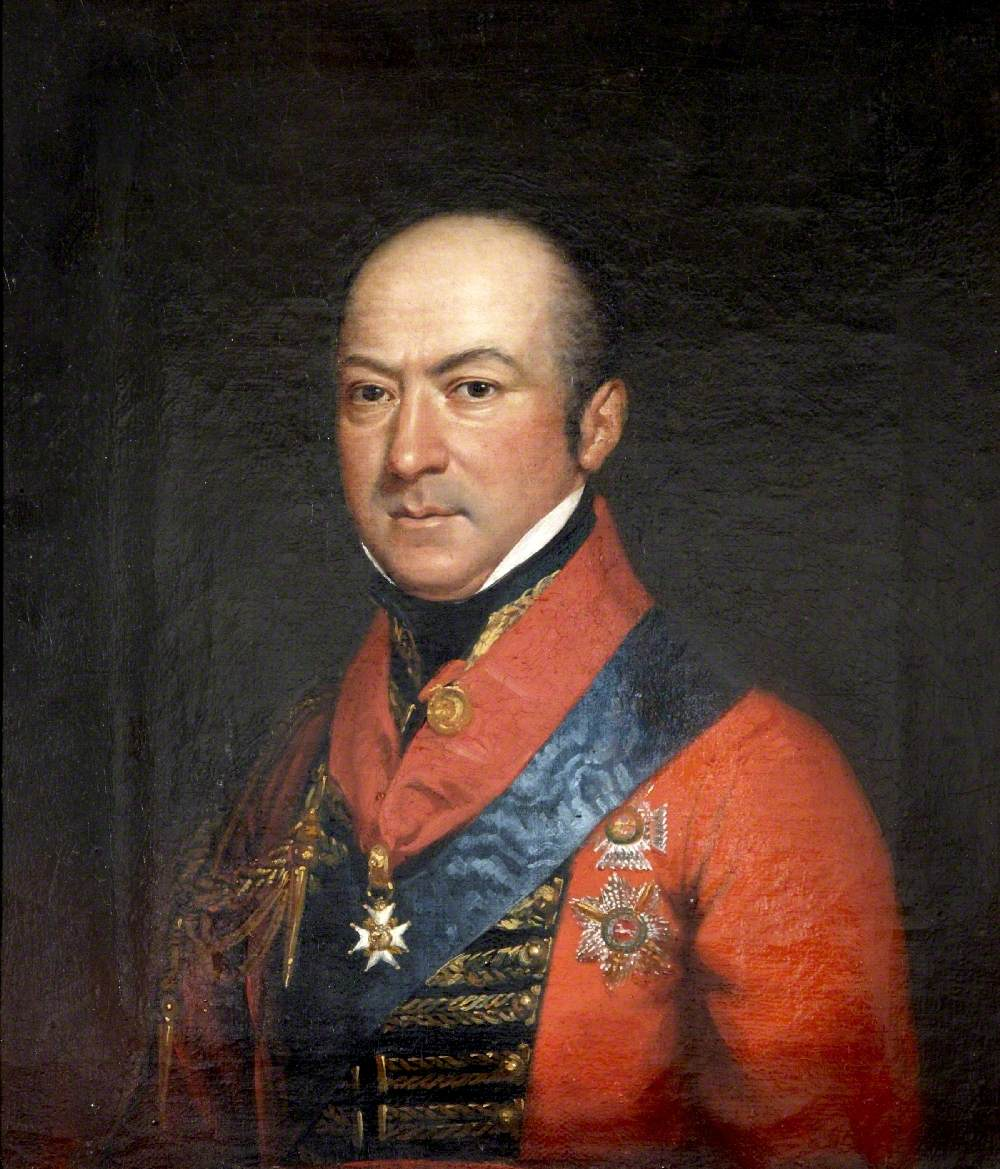
- Born: Henry Tucker Montresor; 18 April 1767
- Died: 10 March 1837 (aged 69) Downe Hill, Canterbury, Kent, England

General Sir Henry Tucker Montresor GCH KCB (18 April 1767 – 10 March 1837) was a general in the British Army.

He was born the son of Captain John Montresor; Henry's brothers were also officers in the Army. From a 2nd Lieutenant in the 23rd Foot in 1780, he progressed to the rank of lieutenant colonel of the 18th Foot by 1795. He was then successively promoted brigadier general (1804), major general (1810), lieutenant general (1814) and full general (1837). He saw active service in Corsica 1795 or 1796 commanding the Anglo-Corsican Corps and after the surrender of Calvi was appointed its commandant. He was in Elba in 1796.

As lieutenant-colonel of the 18th (Royal Irish) Regiment he led the regiment at the landing in Egypt in 1801 and during the subsequent campaign. For some time he was the commander of Rosetta. Promoted Brigadier General he was posted to the West Indies from 1805 to 1808, where he was captured by a French ship en route to Jamaica and released on parole on condition that he did not continue to serve. He saw further service on the Home Staff in 1808–1809, in the Walcheren Campaign in 1809, and was back on the staff in Ireland in 1810–1812. He was in Sicily 1812–1814, commanded a division in Italy at Genoa in 1814, and was in Corsica in 1814.

He was honoured with a knighthood in 1818 and was appointed KCB in 1820 and GCH in 1817. He was made colonel of the 11th (North Devonshire) Regiment from 1823 to his death in 1837. He died at his seat, Downe Hill, near Canterbury.

Military offices
Preceded by Sir Charles Asgill, 2nd Baronet	Colonel of the 11th (the North Devonshire) Regiment of Foot; 1823–1837	Succeeded by Sir Rufane Shaw Donkin
