= Daniel-Marie Chabert de Joncaire de Clausonne =

French Army officer and interpreter

- Born: c. 1714
- Died: 1771 (aged 56–57); Detroit, Quebec, British America
- Military career
- Allegiance: France
- Service years: 1739–1759
- Known for: Establishment of Fort du Portage
- Conflicts: 7 Years War Siege of Fort Niagara

Daniel-Marie Chabert de Joncaire de Clausonne (Note: also stylized as Daniel Joncaire, Sieur de Chabert et de Clausonne or Daniel-Marie Joncaire Chaber) (c. 1714 – 1771) was a French army officer and interpreter in New France who established Fort du Portage near Niagara Falls and fought in the French and Indian War.

== Early life ==
Daniel-Marie Chabert de Joncaire de Clausonne was born to Louis-Thomas Chabert de Joncaire and Marie-Madeleine Le Gay. He was baptized on January 6, 1714 in Repentigny, New France. He was the younger brother of Philippe-Thomas Chabert de Joncaire and was often confused for both his father and brother.

Like his brother, Joncaire was sent to live with the Haudenosaunee at a young age. He also lived with the Odawa, Ojibwe, and Shawnee, and later married the Seneca Marguerite-Élisabeth-Ursule Rocbert de La Morandière in Montreal.

== Career ==
In 1739 and 1740, Joncaire was a cadet, took part of the force sent to assist Jean-Baptiste Le Moyne de Bienville's attack on the Chickasaws in the Chickasaw Campaign of 1739, and then served as the interpreter during the negotiations of the subsequent peace treaty.

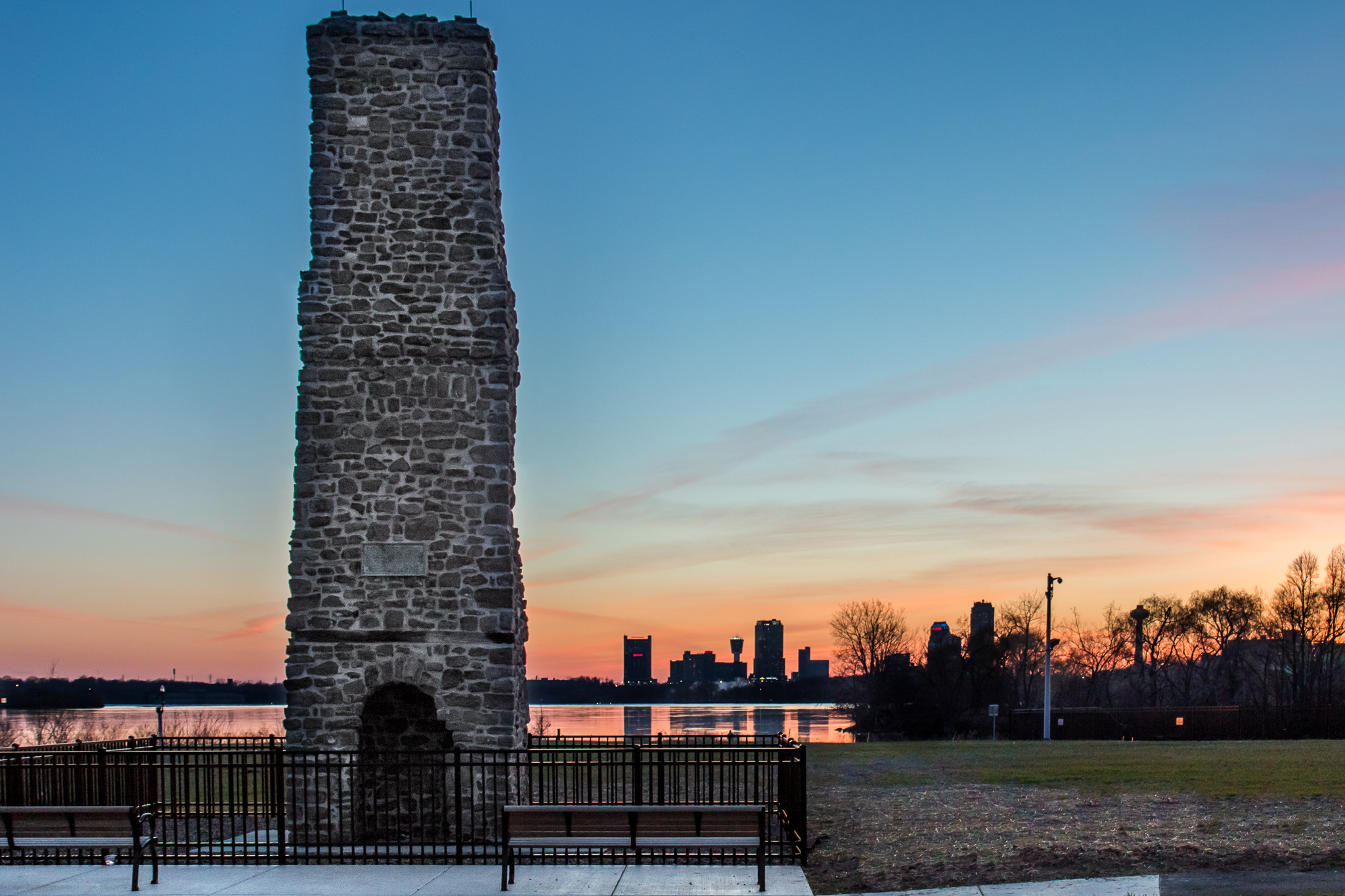
The Old Stone Chimney, originally part of a barracks at the Fort du Portage, in its new 2015 location near the Niagara River in Niagara Falls, New York.

In 1748, Joncaire was promoted to ensign. Daniel-Marie replaced his brother Philippe-Thomas as the principal agent for New France among the Haudenosaunee after Philippe-Thomas's resignation. Joncaire commanded the construction of a new fort, called Fort du Portage or Little Niagara Fort, at the upper landing of the Niagara Portage 1.5 miles (2.4 km) above Niagara Falls to intercept furs intended for the British at Fort Oswego. In 1750, Joncaire built a small canal above Niagara Falls to power a sawmill. In 1757, Joncaire was promoted to lieutenant.

In 1759, he had Fort du Portage burned down and moved his garrison to reinforce Fort Niagara. On July 25, 1759, Joncaire was one of the officers who signed the surrender at the Battle of Fort Niagara.

== Later life ==
The British were relieved when Joncaire left Canada in 1761 due to his influence among the natives. Upon his return, Joncaire was implicated in the Canada Affair during the Seven Years' War and consequently imprisoned in the Bastille. During his trial, his defence was based on records which were destroyed when he burned down Fort du Portage; the court found him guilty of carelessness in his inventories of provisions in 1763 but effectively acquitted him with a warning against future recurrences.

In 1764, Joncaire went to London and unsuccessfully asked King George III for the land of the former Fort du Portage. He was prevented by Governor James Murray from trading with the native population in Niagara, but was later given permission by William Johnson and Murray's successor, Guy Carleton. He died in Detroit in 1771 and was buried on July 5.
