= Guy Frégault =

Canadian writer and historian

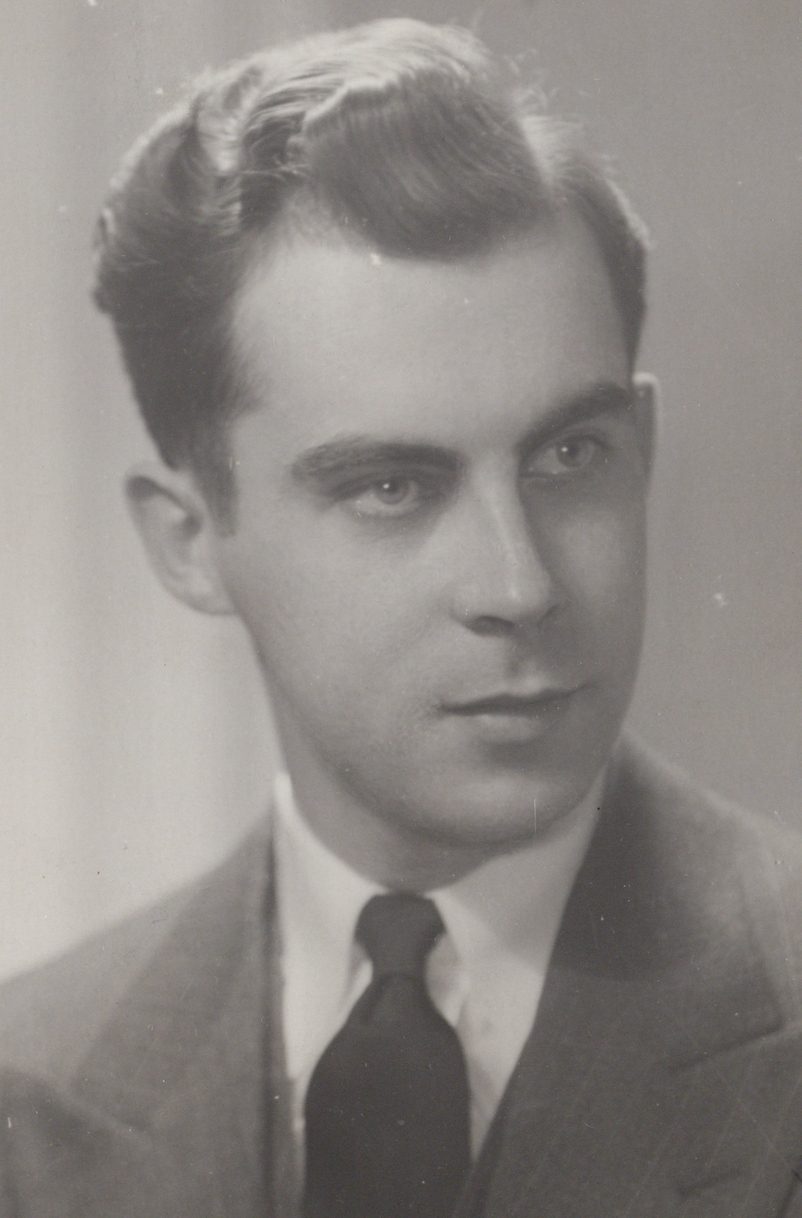
- Born: June 16, 1918; Montreal, Quebec, Canada
- Died: December 13, 1977 (aged 59); Quebec City, Quebec, Canada

Guy Frégault (June 16, 1918 – December 13, 1977) was a Canadian historian and writer from Quebec.

He worked at the history department of Montreal University.

== Biography ==
Frégault was born in Montreal on June 16, 1918. He lived his childhood and adolescence in Hochelaga, a working-class neighborhood of East Montreal. In 1937, he began publishing his first articles in L'Action nationale and La Relève. He studied at the Saint-Laurent College and, later, the Collège Jean-de-Brébeuf. He soon enrolled in the Faculty of Arts at the Université de Montréal, becoming a Bachelor of Arts in May, 1940.

In the beginning, nothing special predisposed Frégault to becoming one of the first "professional" historians of Quebec; on the contrary, he had devoted himself to teaching Greek, studying at the École normale supérieure in Paris funded by the patronage of Bishop Émile Chartier, Dean of the Faculty of Arts and Vice-Rector of the Université de Montréal. Chartier had been very impressed with Frégault's excellent academic record, so Chartier assured him, on Frégault's return from Paris, of his success to the profession of Greek. This program was about to end when the Second World War ruined his plans, along with the plans of many other young intellectuals also looking to stay in Europe. In 1937, his patriotic concerns led him to contacting Lionel Groulx, who, after having carefully read his plan for the Révolution de l'Ordre laurentien (Revolution of the Laurentian Order), was "immediately interested in him." In 1940, when hostilities became far more serious, remaining in France remained increasingly improbable.

Groulx began to see Frégault as a possible successor. Groulx offered that Frégault studies in the Loyola University Chicago under the direction of Jean Delanglez. However, while Chartier wanted to make him a Classicist, Groulx tried to interest him with history. These prestigious offers give us a glimpse of the talent his contemporaries recognized in him (but they didn't fail to deeply embarrass him). In the end, the capitulation of France in June, 1940, was what decided his final choice of career. When Paris surrendered, Frégault had no choice but to accept Groulx's offer and go to study as a historian in the United States. As Groulx was looking for a successor, he spares Frégault a training stay in the United States to avoid what he experienced himself, "the chore of improvisation in a profession where one does not improvise."

Upon his arrival at Loyola University Chicago, Frégault had no research subject. Father Delanglez, who was to be his advisor, offered him a spot at "The quarry of Pierre Le Moyne d'Iberville". Delanglez would come to strongly influence Frégault. At first, he was a little disconcerted by the learning required as a historian, but he quickly adjusted and completed his studies at a fast pace. In June, 1942, just 18 months after his arrival in Chicago, he began writing his doctoral thesis, entitled Iberville the Conqueror, which was published in 1944.

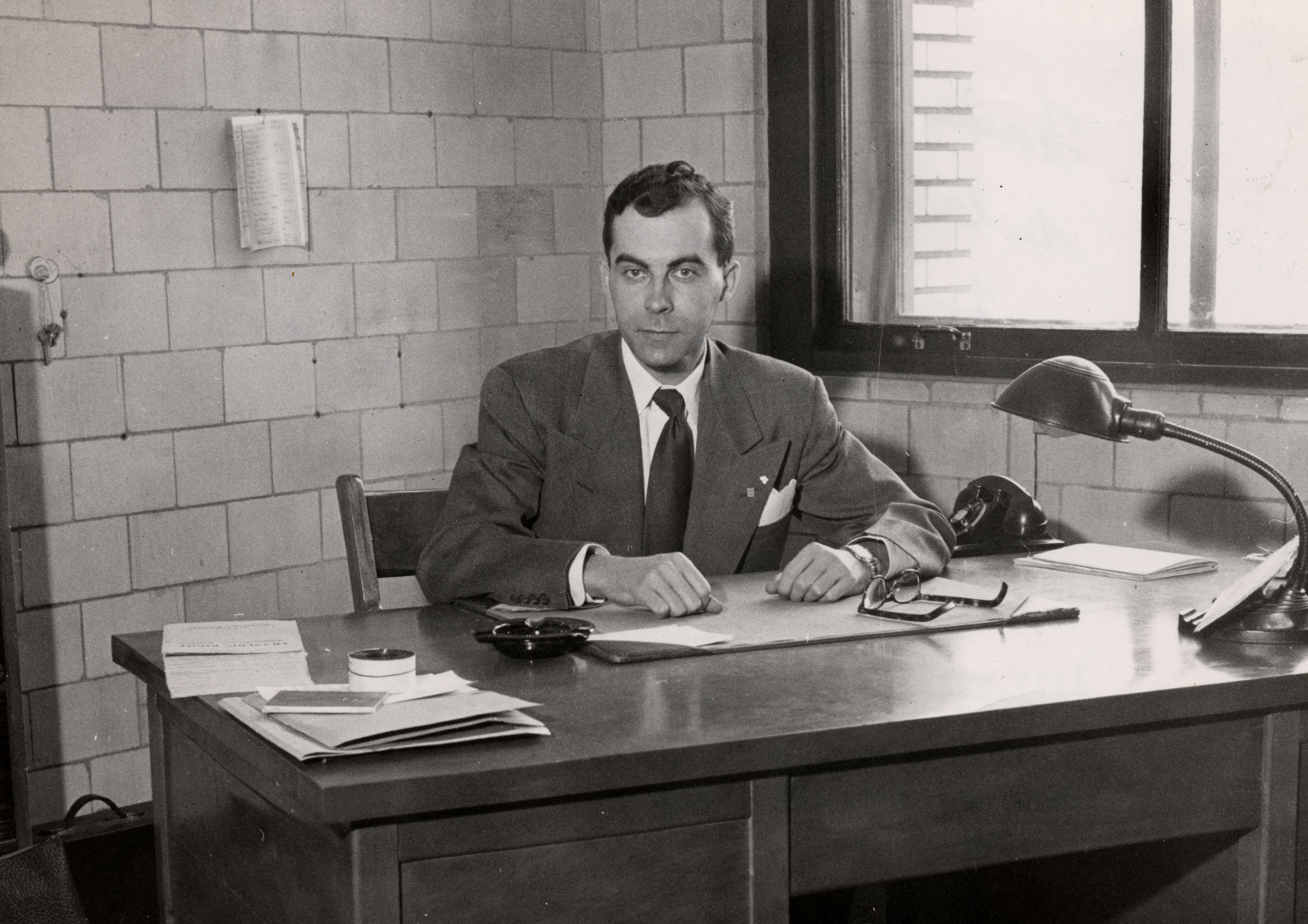

In the fall of 1943, Frégault inaugurated the first historical methodology course that had ever been offered in a Quebec university and, at the same time, introduced the practice of history seminars while teaching a course on the public institutions of New France. Chartier, who was asked to appoint his successors for the seven positions he held at Université de Montréal on June 24, 1944, entrusted Frégault with Canadian literature. At the same time, also thanks to Chartier (who had a long-standing relationship with Grolier), Frégault became one of the principle contributors to the French-Canadian of its encyclopedia, which began to appear in 1947. At the creation of the Institut d'histoire (Institute of History), Robert Rumilly took over from Frégault at Grolier. A few months after the publication of Iberville the Conqueror—a book through which he would become the first winner of the Duvernay Award of the Saint-Jean-Baptiste Society of Montreal—he published The Civilization of New France. The close publication of the two works earned him a solid reputation as a historian as early as 1944.

In 1945, aged 26, Frégault became a founding member of the Académie des lettres du Québec and received the Vermeil Medal from the Société historique de Montréal (Montreal Historical Society). In 1947, he was the first recipient of the prix David, which he was awarded for Iberville the Conqueror and The Civilization of New France. From September, 1946, to May, 1947, he was the director of L'Action nationale.

When he turned 30, Frégault agreed to take over the direction of the new Institute of History at Université de Montréal, having had already published over 100 articles and reports during the previous 10 years in major journals at the time. On top of this achievement he also wrote biographies and historical texts for the first French-Canadian edition of the Grolier encyclopedia in 1947—1948.

After the creation of the Institute of History in early 1947, he became the Associate Professor and Director of it, a position he occupied (jointly with the vice-president of the Institute of History of French America, which was recently founded by Groulx) until his departure for the University of Ottawa in 1959.

From the start of his directorship of the Institute of History of Montreal, Frégault devoted himself entirely to the development of scientific history, which he conceived in an essentially national perspective. From 1948 to 1961, he received many honors and administrated responsibilities. Notably, he delivered three public works that definitively established him as the specialist on New France.

In 1948, he published a large study named François Bigot, administrateur français (2 volumes). Then, starting work with Groulx in the fall of 1949, he held the professorship of the same name, created for the occasion, until Maurice Séguin replaced him in 1959. In 1949, he became permanent secretary of the Academie canadienne-francaise. In the fall of 1950, Frégault was made the vice-dean and a professor of the Faculty of Arts; likewise, he held this role until his departure in 1959.

In 1951, he was elected to the Canadian Historical Association Board of Directors, a position he held until 1954. In 1951, he was awarded the Silver Medal of the Latin Order of Charity. In parallel with his lectures and administrative activities, he and his wife pursued intensive research throughout the United States, which led to the publication of another biography in 1952, entitled The Grand Marquis - Pierre de Rigaud of Vaudreuil and Louisiana. In the same year, he visited a professor at the University of Toronto and participated in the creations of the History of Canada by the texts - 1534-1854 along with Michel Brunet and Marcel Trudel.

Between 1952 and 1955, in secrecy, he worked to lay the foundations of what would, in 1955, become the Association of Professors of the University of Montreal, of which he was the first president. Also in 1955, Frégault published what was to be his magnum opus, his masterpiece; The War of the Conquest. Thanks to this book, he became—for the second time—a recipient of the prix David in 1959. In the meantime, in 1954, he published The Canadian Society under the French Regime and, in the same year, received the Léo-Pariseau Prize of the French-Canadian Association for the Advancement of Science. At that time, his reputation as a historian reached its peak. "No jury," writes Marie-Claire Daveluy, "is formed without him, if this jury exercises its mandate in the field that the historian has conquered by his personal culture and the publication of books that attest to his lucid version of the facts."

In 1959, Frégault decided to leave the University of Montreal for the University of Ottawa, where he held the A.-J. Freiman, of which he was the first holder. From 1956 to 1961, he published several important articles which would later be put together in 1968 in a volume entitled The Eighteenth Century Canadian. He also received the J. B. Tyrrell Historical Medal from the Royal Society of Canada in 1961 and the university of Ottawa recognized his outstanding contribution by giving him an honorary D.A.

Beginning in 1961, he began a new career as the first Deputy Minister of the newly created Ministère de la Culture et des Communications (Ministry of Culture and Communications), a position he held from 1961 to 1966 and from 1970 to 1975. In the meantime, he held the positions of Commissioner General for External Cooperation at the Quebec Department of Intergovernmental Affairs and Special Advisor for the Prime Minister on Language Policy. Then, starting in 1975, he was special advisor on cultural matters to the Executive Council until his sudden death in 1977.

In addition, in 1962 and 1968, he received two honorary doctorates, one from the Université Sainte-Anne in Pointe-de-l'Église, Nova Scotia and the other from the University of Waterloo. He also received the Centennial Medal in 1982 and, in 1969, the Prix France-Québec from the Association des écrivains d'expression française as well as the prix Montcalm from the Syndicat des journalistes et écrivains for the 18th Century. Furthermore, also in 1969, he was the recipient of the Prix de l'Académie française. When Groulx died in 1967, the Institute of the History of French America (May 1968 to May 1970) and the University of Montreal named him professor emeritus in 1970. Finally, during his years in the public service, Frégault wrote and published two other important books: Chronique des années perdues in 1976 and, notably, Lionel Groulx tel qu'en lui-même in 1978.

He was buried at the Cimetière Notre-Dame-de-Belmont in Sainte-Foy, Quebec.

The archives of Guy Frégault are preserved at the Montreal archives center, Bibliothèque et Archives nationales du Québec.

== Bibliography ==
- Jean Lamarre, "À la jointure de la conscience et de la culture – L'École historique de Montréal au tournant des années 1950" archive, Simon Langlois et Yves Martin (dir.), L'horizon de la culture – Hommage à Fernand Dumont, Québec, Institut québécois de recherche sur la culture – Les Presses de l'Université Laval, 1995, p. 281-298.
