= Fort Schlosser =

Historic British colonial fort in Niagara Falls, New York, United States

- Niagara Falls, New York
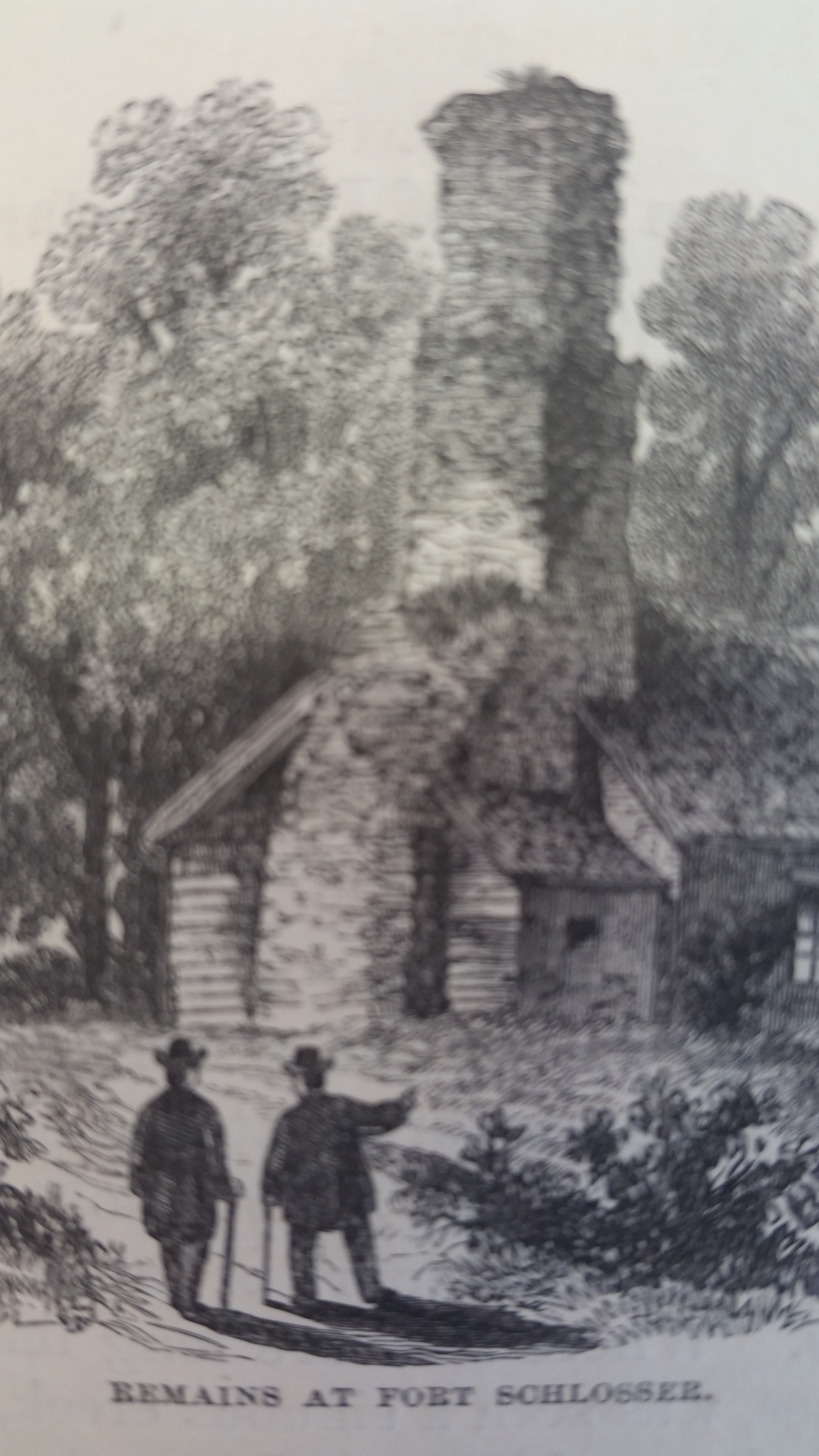
- Remains of Fort Schlosser

Site information
- Type: Military fortification
- Controlled by: Great Britain (1760–1812); US Army (1812–1813)

Location
- Coordinates: 43°4′39.14″N 79°00′56.02″W

Site history
- Built: 1760
- In use: 1760–1813
- Materials: wood
- Battles/wars: War of 1812

Garrison information
- Past commanders: Joseph Schlosser 1760–1764
- Garrison: British Army, US Army

Fort Schlosser was a fortification built in Western New York in the United States around 1760 by British colonial forces, in order to guard the upper entrance to the Niagara Portage around Niagara Falls, north of Porter-Barton Dock or Schlosser's Landing along the shoreline with the Niagara River.

The fort was named for its first commander, Captain Joseph Schlosser of the Royal American Regiment of Foot, a practice that was common in the British Army.

== Facilities ==
The fort consisted of a wood stockade with several structures within:

- Two storehouses
- Living quarters for officers and soldiers

Four cannons provided protection for the fort.

== Replacement ==
The fort replaced Fort Petite Niagara or Fort du Portage, a small fortification built by the French (Daniel-Marie Chabert de Joncaire) which was burned by the retreating French prior to the Siege of Fort Niagara in 1759. The Old Stone Chimney from Fort Little Niagara was incorporated into Fort Schlosser. Fort Grey guarded the end of the portage in Lewiston, NY. Fort Niagara guards the mouth of the Niagara where it flows into Lake Ontario.

Fort Schlosser was occupied by American troops at the start of the War of 1812, but was captured in 1813 and burned.

The fort was located in present-day Niagara Falls, New York in what is now Niagara County, New York, near the current water intakes for the New York Power Authority off of the Robert Moses Parkway. The remains is the Old Stone Chimney was moved to the former Porter Park near the intersection of Buffalo Avenue and the Robert Moses Parkway in 1957 to near a traffic circle about 1.5 miles from the original fort site. The chimney was relocated in 2015 and is fenced off with a sign providing details on the history of the fort.

== See also ==
- Fort Niagara
