= James Gabriel Montresor =

British Army officer (1704-1776)

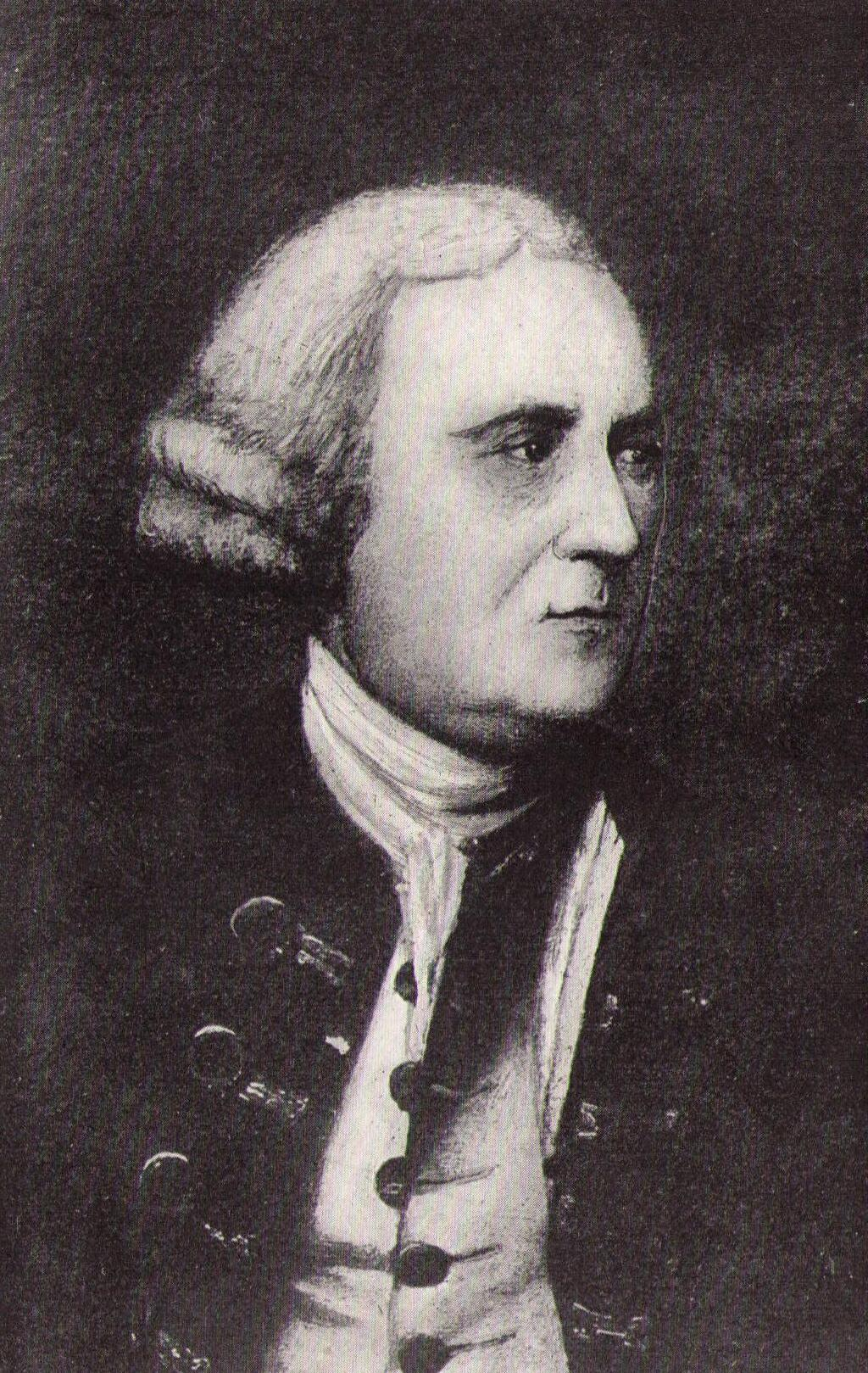
- 1904 portrait
- Born: 19 November 1704; London, England
- Died: 6 January 1776 (aged 71); Teynham, Kent
- Relatives: John Montresor (son), Susanna Haswell Rowson (niece), Robert Haswell (nephew), Henry Fielding (father-in-law)
- Military career
- Allegiance: Kingdom of Great Britain
- Branch: British Army
- Service years: 1727–1776
- Rank: Colonel
- Units: Royal Engineers; 14th Regiment of Foot
- Conflicts: French and Indian War

Colonel James Gabriel Montresor (19 November 1704 – 6 January 1776) was a British Army officer who served in the French and Indian War.

== Early life and the western Mediterranean ==
Montresor was born on Broad Street or St. James's in London on 19 November 1704, the son of James Gabriel le Trésor and Nanon de Hauteville. His father, who belonged to a Huguenot refugee family, joined the English Army and was naturalized, taking the name of Montresor. He would later become Lieutenant Governor of Fort William where he died 22 January 1723/4. Montresor was commissioned into the British Army's Royal Artillery in 1727 and was alleged present at the thirteenth siege of Gibraltar, but more credible accounts place him in Menorca, as a matross. He was later a bombardier at Gibraltar, and was there commissioned as an engineer in 1731. He continued to serve at Gibraltar, with a brief interlude in Menorca, until in 1747 he was named chief engineer of Gibraltar. He had also held a commission as lieutenant in the 14th Regiment of Foot since 23 July 1737.

== America ==
In 1754, he was appointed chief engineer for General Edward Braddock and went to British North America with the troops. He is frequently said to have been present at the defeat of the Braddock Expedition in 1755, but this appears to confuse him with his son John Montresor, who was wounded in the battle (some accounts suggest illness prevented the father's presence). He spent most of the remainder of the French and Indian War in and around Albany, New York, where his activities included the design and construction of numerous military fortifications, including a new fort on the site previously occupied by Fort William Henry, named Fort George. Montresor was promoted to major on 14 May 1757 and again to lieutenant colonel on 4 January 1758.

== Return to Britain ==
By 1760, he had risen to the role of chief engineer in the Provinces, and in recognition of his efforts in New York he was granted 10,000 acres (40 km^{2}) of land on the eastern (Vermont) side of Lake Champlain. However, in that year ill health forced his return to England, followed by the resignation of his commission in the 14th Foot in 1762. He would later construct powder magazines at Purfleet, and was chief engineer at Chatham Dockyard. Throughout his career, he also drafted numerous maps and plans of the areas around which he was stationed, and kept journals, which have been published. On 25 May 1772 Montresor was promoted to colonel.

James Gabriel Montresor married first, 11 June 1735, Mary Haswell, daughter of Robert Haswell, Master Attendant of the royal dockyard at Gibraltar. By her he had two daughters and five sons, most notable among these being John Montresor. Mary died 5 March 1761. He remarried 25 August 1766, Henrietta Fielding, daughter of novelist Henry Fielding who was already "in deep decline", and died months later, 11 December 1766. Montresor married as his third wife Frances Nickolls, daughter of H. Nickolls and widow of William Kemp. He died at Teynham, Kent, 6 January 1776.
