= French ship Prudent =

Several ships of the French Navy have borne the name Prudent or Prudente:

== Ships named Prudent ==
- Prudent (1658), a 58-gun ship, condemned in 1696.
- Prudent (1697), a 60-gun ship, burnt to avoid capture during the Battle of Vigo Bay in 1702.
- Prudent (1753), a 74-gun ship, burnt to avoid capture during the Siege of Louisbourg in 1758.
- Prudent (1753), a flûte, which foundered in 1772.

== Ships named Prudente ==
- Prudente (1778), a 32-gun ship, captured by HMS Aeolus in 1779 and taken into service as HMS Prudente. She was sold in 1803.
- Prudente (1790), a 36-gun Capricieuse-class frigate, captured by HMS Daedalus in 1799.
