= François-Maurice de Cointet de Fillain =

French military man and politician

François Maurice Cointet de Fillain

Governor General of Guiana
- In office 6 November 1794 – 16 April 1796
- Preceded by: Henri Benoist
- Succeeded by: Pierre François Lambert Lamoureux de la Gennetière

Personal details
- Born: 20 April 1766 Ensisheim, Kingdom of France
- Died: 21 April 1809 (43 years) Paris, First French Empire
- Parent(s): Henri-François de Cointet de Fillain; Anne-Louise-Françoise de Beurville
- Occupation: Politician, military man
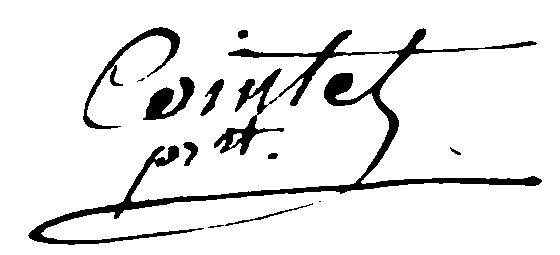
- Signature

François-Maurice de Cointet de Fillain (22 April 1766 – 21 April 1809) was a French military man and Governor General of Guiana from 1794 to 1796.

== Early life ==
François-Maurice de Cointet de Fillain was born in Ensisheim, France on 20 April 1766 from Henri-François de Cointet de Fillain, a career military man and hereditary Bailly du Roi at Ensisheim, and Anne-Louise-Françoise de Beurville.

Little is known about Cointet's childhood. He likely lived at the family home in Ensiheim and went to the college of Colmar once of age.

== Military career ==
=== France ===
Cointet joined the army on 9 August 1782 as sub-lieutenant of the Régiment d'Alsace, a German-language regiment. He was garrisoned at Strasbourg. He reached the rank of second lieutenant in 1786, then first lieutenant in 1789.

The Régiment d'Alsace became embroiled in the French Revolution, with the ranks and some of its officers (including friends of Cointet) supporting it. Soon after the Régiment d'Alsace (now officially called the 53e Régiment) took garrison at Givet in March 1791, Cointet joined the Club of the Friends of the Constitution, a pro-revolutionary organisation affiliated to the Jacobins. He became an active militant. Within the year, Cointet was the club's secretary.

In early April 1792, the second battalion of the 53ème Régiment, of which Cointet was now captain, left Cambrai for Lorient, from which it would eventually depart to Cayenne, Guiana. Cointet obtained a leave to go to Ensiheim to get family affairs in order and say farewells, and eventually joined back his unit at Port-Louis, near Lorient. At Lorient, Cointet sent a letter to the city's residents on behalf of the ranks asking for justice after their mistreatment by the garrison.

After his battalion was split into nine companies of 80 men, Cointet led a company of riflemen. The battalion embarked in the early days of July 1792, alongside the recently appointed Civil Commissoneer Guillot and Governor General Charles Guillaume Vial d'Alais. The battalion was sent to Guiana to relieve the 111ème R.I. as a "troop of sovereignty" and to help Guillot deal with unrest amongst the black population after the spread of revolutionary ideals and the jurisdiction conflict between the Colonial Assembly and the governor.

=== Guiana ===
The battalion reached Cayenne on 22 September 1792, and disembarked the next day. Amidst political events in both Guiana and France, Cointet eventually affiliated with the Jacobin Club des Amis de la Liberté, of which he came to be president.

On 13 April 1793, Cointet witnessed the arrival of the new Civil Commissioneer Jeannet-Oudin. On 1 August 1793, Cointet entered Governor Benoîst's council of war as a redactor. After Jeannet-Oudin purged officers opposed to the recent abolition of slavery, Cointet was left the most senior from France and was given a promotion, now commanding the battalion with the rank of lieutenant-colonel.

== Office ==
=== Governor General of French Guiana ===
The governor general Benoîst retired, and Cointet replaced him on 6 November 1794. Three days later, Cointet married the ex-wife of Jean-Antoine Ménard, Elisabeth-Rosalie Amalric. On December 4, considering his mission finished, Jeannet left the colony to seek aid from France. Jeannet-Oudin transferred his powers to Cointet and left him instructions to follow.

On the same day, an insurrection ignited in the cantons of Roura and Macoury was sparked by the rumor that the Portuguese had landed on the coast of Rémiré, conspiring with the whites of Cayenne to reestablish slavery. Jeannet's departure also played a role in the insurrection, as the ex-slaves had grown to trust him. The insurrection was quelled. Such rumors of the Ancien régime and slavery's return had been spread by whites since abolition, but became quasi-constant under Cointet. They would last until the fall of Burnel in 1799.

On 4 January 1795, Cointet embargoed harbors to stop white settlers from leaving the colony.

Cointet created the First National Battalion of Guiana on 7 April 1795. The project was met with heavy protest, and the ordonnateur Corio thereon continually clashed with Cointet.

A long law prepared by Cointet was discussed and amended in the Colonial Assembly on 7 February 1795. It punished vagrancy, joblessness, banned sorcerers and prophets, and forbid individual familial farms. Agricultural councils and discipline councils were to be established in each canton and plantation respectively. A system involving the separation of a plantation's revenues in three parts, with a third belonging to the workers, was to be imposed. Workers were to be paid according to their tasks and working time. Workshop police was regulated. Owners were forced to live on their plantation. Work contracts were to be revocable. Workers could quit with one month's notice, and owners could fire employees with 10 days' notice, but must give an indemnity. Ultimately, this law was generally not applied.

On 30 June 1795, a military officer, Polony, arrived in Cayenne with 1 schooner, 1 aviso and 2 gunboats. They transported previous members of the Committee of Public Safety condemned to deportation: Jacques-Nicolas Billaud-Varenne and Jean-Marie Collot d'Herbois. The deportees were immediately separated from Polony, who would write a scathing report about Cointet.

Officers from the naval division stirred trouble by claiming that the state's money had lost its value after the rich had bought too many goods. Cointet sent an indictment to France against these officers, to no effect.

On 17 December 1795, Cointet passed a law requisitioning the habitations (plantations) of absent owners, the State now having 47 plantations in total. Cointet had to convince a popular assembly of black citizens that the law did not hinder their freedom. Work on these plantations became a public service, and the plantation workers were thus also requisitioned. A salary was imposed on them, unlike other workers who could negotiate their salary with the plantation owners. Military men were posted to police lazy or troublemaking workers. This law was likely inspired by Collot d'Herbois, with whom Cointet often spoke. Soon after, an insurrection started in Kourou, only to be calmed by two black citizens from Sinnamary.

Cointet faced numerous political problems during this period. The anthem Le Réveil du Peuple almost caused violence. The recently reactionary opinions of once revolutionary notables like Polony encouraged previous slave owners to voice up and spread rumors. Cointet noted the uncertainty of black citizens, scared of slavery's possible return. Cointet also stressed French Guiana's need for local laws.

In 1795–1796, French Guiana was in crisis. It lacked money, exportable goods and basic supplies, and was also plagued by inflation. According to Cointet, there was also a famine, resulting in increased mortality - although there is no evidence of such a famine. In late 1795, Cointet managed to get a ship past the blockade, reach Guadeloupe and hand Victor Hugues a letter asking for aid. Cointet asked for money, supplies and detailed accounts of the events of Guadeloupe (Victor-Hugues was seen as an example to follow to deal with problems of slavery's abolition). Cointet received a letter of credit, rum, sugar, sheets, cloth and string. He also received advice, although it was seemingly not of much inspiration to Cointet.

On 27 January 1796, Cointet thwarted an insurrection aiming to kill key figures of the republican regime, take power, establish an independent Guiana and, according to Cointet, kill all whites in Guiana. Surveillance, likely by Cointet's secret police, allowed Cointet to prevent the rebels' plans from execution. Fifteen rebels were executed and four whites were deported for agitating the black population. After the insurrection, Cointet started destroying ex-slaves' familial farms, enforcing a 13 August 1795 law by the Colonial Assembly that banned individual familial farms.

In January 1796, Oudin was named Particular Agent of the Republic by the Directory, and on 27 January, the Directory named a new governor, the brigade general Le Genetière of the Army of the Western Pyrenees. Oudin and La Genetière arrived in Cayenne on 14 April 1796 and disembarked from their ship two days later.

== Later life ==
=== Return to France ===
Cointet left Cayenne in June 1796. At the entrance of the English Channel, he was taken prisoner by an English ship and was only freed after directly appealing to the English Admiralty. He finally arrived in Ensisheim on the 19 April 1797 and reunited with his family, in financial ruin after the revolution.

On 23 August 1797, Cointet presented himself to the government, asking to be rewarded for his past service and offering his services. The government did not take up his offer, and Cointet continued to be paid as an off-duty chief of battalion with the meager sum of 100 livres per month. Cointet attempted to obtain the rank of chief of brigade, but to no success.

The Directory evaluated Cointet's governorship positively despite noting that he had overstepped his authority and that much of his expenses remained unjustified, taking into account his difficult circumstances. For his office expenses and as additional salary, Cointet was awarded 5006 piastres, from which 4380 and 1/4 piastres were deduced for funds already received at Cayenne - thus mostly reimbursing Cointet for the budgetary deficits he had to endure.

Answering the First Consul's call, Cointet volunteered to join the Army of the Rhine or the Reserve Army in spring 1800. In early June, he was given a position in the general staff of the Army of the Rhine. The Army of the Rhine was dissolved on the 1 May 1801 after the Treaty of Lunéville, and Cointet returned to civilian life, perceiving a pension of 1000 francs per year in 1802.

=== Civilian life and death ===
Cointet and his wife settled down in Paris in 1801 or 1802, where he lived a modest lifestyle. Elisabeth-Rosalie's death in October 1802 deeply affected Cointet. Cointet marriage with his niece Sophie-Antoinette de Schauenbourg was celebrated on 18 February 1803 at the castle of Martinsbourg, Wettolsheim. From this marriage a girl, Adèle, was birthed on 6 April 1805. In 1804, Cointet started a trading house with his close friend Dernois named "Dernois, Cointet et Cie". He did not participate in the trading house's business. While giving birth, Sophie-Antoinette died on 31 August 1805 while giving birth. A year later, Cointet married his third wife, Marie-Fidèle-Adélaide de Fladslanden, at Hollenbach, Bavaria. Going forward, Cointet's lifestyle was more luxurious.

Cointet fell seriously ill and despite medical care died at his home on 21 April 1809.

== Evaluation ==
Cointet was more strong-armed than his predecessor. When required, Cointet could be decisive and authoritarian. This style, characteristic of the Year II in France, earned Cointet many enemies (including the ordonnateur Corio).

During his tenure, Cointet managed to impose order in Guiana. Cointet was also an idealist, although often restrained by his difficult position. He worked toward reconciling whites and blacks in Guiana despite this project's implausibility. He categorically refused forcing newly freed slaves to work by coercion and recognized freed slaves' right to enjoy the fruit of their work and own property. Cointet also gave rewards and retirement pensions to requisitioned workers based on merit.
