= Georges Nicolas Jeannet-Oudin =

French politician

Civil Commissioner of Guiana
- In office 14 April 1793 – November 1794
- Preceded by: Frédéric Joseph Guillot
- Succeeded by: François-Maurice de Cointet de Fillain (as Governor General)

Agent of the Directory of Guiana
- In office April 1796 – November 1798
- Preceded by: François-Maurice de Cointet de Fillain (as Governor General)
- Succeeded by: Étienne-Laurent-Pierre Burnel

Agent of the Directory of Guadeloupe
- In office 12 December 1799 – 29 May 1801
- Preceded by: Paris (as provisional agent) Edme Étienne Borne-Desfourneaux (as agent)
- Succeeded by: Jean-Baptiste Raymond de Lacrosse

Personal details
- Born: 3 October 1762 Arcis-sur-Aube, Kingdom of France
- Died: 20 October 1828 (aged 66) Arcis-sur-Aube, Kingdom of France
- Spouse(s): Victoria Oudin; Catherine David
- Parent(s): Louis Nicolas Jeannet; Anne Jeannet
- Occupation: Politician, Merchant

Georges Nicolas Jeannet-Oudin (3 October 1762 – 20 October 1828) was a French politician who served as mayor of Arcis-sur-Aube, civil commissioner of Guiana, agent of the Directory of Guiana and agent of the Directory of Guadeloupe.

== Biography ==
Jeannet-Oudin was born in Arcis-sur-Aube on 3 October 1762 to sock maker Louis Nicolas Jeannet and Anne Jeannet. He was raised in a prominent mercantile family. In his youth, he became a cotton merchant like his father. He was Louis-François Jeannet's brother and Georges Danton's cousin. He married Victoria Oudin and outlived her, then married Catherine David.

In 1790, Jeannet-Oudin was elected mayor in Arcis-sur-Aube. He served in the Executive Council presided over by Danton in 1792.

=== Civil Commissioner of Guiana ===
Jeannet-Oudin arrived in Cayenne on 14 April 1793, carrying instructions from the minister of the navy, Gaspard Monge. Jeannet-Oudin was to ensure better conditions for slaves using older legislation's protective clauses until the colonists decided to enact "more enlightened laws". He was tasked with investigating Native Americans' possible civism as well, and brought a decree naming Henri Benoist governor.

While French Guiana's Colonial Assembly tolerated Jeannet-Oudin, it was hostile to the new governor Benoist. It waged some kind of guerilla against the government, which was solved diplomatically by Jeannet-Oudin. Jeannet reminded the Colonial Assembly of the extraordinary powers given to civil commissioners due to the war and rejected the Assembly's claims on habitations (plantations) requisitioned by the previous Civil Commissioner Guillot.

In 1793 and 1794, the English invaded French colonies in the Caribbean. Guiana was not directly endangered, but it had to avoid becoming an easy target. In June, Jeannet-Oudin requisitioned 10% of all slaves to fortify Cayenne, with the works being led by Benoist. After an English privateer was spotted on Guiana's coast, Jeannet-Oudin bought and armed a state schooner, the Galibi, to hunt English ships.

Jeannet-Oudin quickly came to the conclusion that the Convention had to abolish slavery to ensure justice for slaves. On 13 June 1794, French warships arrived in Cayenne. The commanding officer, Polony from the Oiseau, brought the decree of 16 Pluviose banning slavery; it had to be enforced immediately. There were specifications as to how the decree had to be applied, which were not followed by Jeannet-Oudin. The next morning, Jeannet-Oudin proclaimed the immediate abolition of slavery in French Guiana. All black slaves were thus freed and became citizens.

Jeannet-Oudin had no instructions as to what must succeed to slavery, and spent the next two days organizing and regulating the new state of affairs. A 16 June 1794 law kept the economy on the same basis of white plantation owners and black workers, but employment now rested on voluntary work contracts that had to be negotiated by involved parties. To combat vagrancy, all new citizens had to notify their municipality of their residency and employment status to obtain a certificate needed to avoid being imprisoned. In the same law, Jeannet-Oudin guaranteed citizen to French Guianese maroons and established the necessity to plant enough food for 1 year due to the state of war. The habitation de la République was to house abandoned orphans and infirms. All new citizens had to enter the national guard.

There was opposition to abolition from the start, although initially not open from white settlers. There was however strong opposition in the army: 8 officers and 3 soldiers were arrested and sent back to France on Jeannet's orders, and François-Maurice de Cointet de Fillain became the leader of the 2nd Battalion of 53rd Infantry Regiment stationed in Cayenne. Some white civilians had also immigrated by the end of the month.

In September 1794, Jeannet-Oudin dissolved the Colonial Assembly that was no longer representative of the population after abolition (the majority of Guiana's inhabitants had been slaves). The primary assemblies voted with universal masculine suffrage, for the first and last time in French Guiana until 1848. Two mulattoes were elected.

On 14 July, delegates from across French Guiana were invited to Cayenne for a "general federation". There was a climate of general satisfaction and peace during this general federation, and there were over 15 days of rest and festivities.

French Guiana's economy suffered from France's war with England and the English blockade. French Guiana was dependent on exporting goods to receive supplies from France due to the very nature of the colonial economy. Subventions from France became irregular. French Guiana had to buy supplies with money or colonial goods, and not bills of exchanges. French Guiana also obtained supplies from privateers' loot, but these represented only 10% of its importations.

In early November 1794, Jeannet-Oudin left for Paris. He considered his mission finished on 9 October, and wished to inform French authorities of French Guiana's situation to seek aid. There had recently been hostilities with Portuguese Brazil. Before leaving, Jeannet-Oudin clarified the relationship between the Colonial Assembly and the Civil Commissioner, wrote a summary of his actions and transferred his powers to Cointet.

=== Agent of the Directory of Guiana ===
Jeannet-Oudin arrived in Cayenne in April 1796 carrying instructions from the minister of the marine and colonies, Laurent Jean François Truguet. Jeannet-Oudin was to create schools in Guiana's principal cities for farm workers' children. They were to be taught basic reading, writing and arithmetic. The best students would be chosen to continue their studies in France. He was also to create a black gendarmerie, notably to repress vagrancy. He was also tasked with evaluating the utility of deportation to Guiana and how it should be carried out. He additionally had to optimize French Guiana's budget, and brought 250 000 Piastres.

The Constitution of Year III was put to a vote in the Departmental Assembly by Jeannet-Oudin, even if it was already in vigor. French Guiana was no longer a colony and was now a department like any other. However, it had an Agent Particulier that inherited powers of the Governor/Civil Commissioner and agricultural regulations that created a particular class of farm workers. Laws were supposed to be applied uniformly across French territory; they were better applied in Guiana than in other ex-colonies, but parliamentary representation was not achieved, with Fréron's election being cancelled in Paris. Guiana was nevertheless represented in France by envoys from the ex Colonial Assembly or the new Department Directory.

On 19 June 1796, Jeannet-Oudin published a decree on plantation work that applied to both state and private plantations. Workers' salaries were fixed. Workers were owed land for food, housing and medical care by owners. Owners or a literate appointee were to live on their plantation. Cointet's requisitions were extended to many other jobs, and salaries were still to be paid in money and not paper money. Scales of punishment were to be established by a plantation's owner, two workers and at least one judge. Owners were also to be sanctioned for not respecting their legal duties. On the same day Jeannet also announced the creation of a primary school in Cayenne.

On 20 March 1798, Jeannet issued a proclamation on the 19 June decree. It was often not respected: owners failed to ensure workers cultivated food on their own land, preferred keeping sicks in their bedrooms, allowed dances on the wrong days and some salaries were not paid at all. Jeannet threatened owners with punishment for their failings. The decree was likely not ever applied by force or with much rigor.

Jeannet reported some progress in the law's enforcement around summer 1796, but news of the monarchist right's rise in France led to the agitation amongst the black population and bad treatment of workers by plantation owners. News of the failure of the Coup of 18 Fructidor relaxed these worries.

On 11 November 1797, the corvette La Vaillante arrived with news of the Coup of 18 fructidor and political deportees involved in said coup. The Coup also stopped Jeannet's recall; which Pléville-Lepelley had decided three days earlier. Jeannet had wanted to quit Guiana too.

Jeannet-Oudin was the subject of many complaints by the Departmental Assembly (the successor to the Colonial Assembly), the representatives of French Guiana in Paris (Pomme and Bagot), and the Directory of the department.

In Brumaire of Year IV, there were reports that Jeannet hired two blacks that had been condemned to 10 years for the insurrection of 27 January 1796 and had pardoned one of its leaders condemned to death in absentia for leading the insurrection and apparently killing a soldier.

Seeing regressions toward anti-abolitionism, Jeannet asked Paris for a national clarification on the subject of slavery, without success.

Jeannet had to replace the commandant of the First National Battalion of Guiana, Lerch after a series of events starting with unpaid salaries that ended with Lerch being harassed and threatened, going into hiding and resigning. Order was otherwise maintained during these events. Lerch was replaced by a man named Stephan. Jeannet asked that the 2nd Battalion of the 53rd Regiment be relieved.

Jeannet-Oudin left Guiana in November 1798.

=== Agent of the Directory of Guadeloupe ===
On 1 September 1799, Jeannet-Oudin was named Agent of the Directory of Guadeloupe alongside René-Gaston Baco de la Chapelle and Étienne Maynaud de Bizefranc de Laveaux. They arrived in Pointe-à-Pitre on 12 December on board of the Vengeance and the Berceau. Jeanned stayed with Baco at Pointe-à-Pitre while Laveaux went to Basse-Terre. Jeannet and Baco named a third agent, Maurice Bresseau.

Jeannet and Bresseau organized an expedition to conquer Curaçao under the pretext that the island was about to surrender to the English. It failed. Jeannet and other agents issued decrees to ward off dangerous strangers, punish desertion, stop maroons and clean up the department's accounts.

Jeannet and other agents were replaced by the captain-general Jean-Baptiste Raymond de Lacrosse on 29 May 1801. Jeannet left Guadeloupe on 5 July 1801.

=== Later life ===
Under Napoléon, Jeannet served in the War Ministry and opened a sugar-beet refinery in Arcis-sur-Aube. He fled France to the United States during the Bourbon Restoration with his wife and children.

Jeannet-Oudin later participated in François Antoine Lallemand's planned invasion of Texas. In 1821 and early 1822, he attempted to foment an uprising of the blacks and mulattoes of Guadeloupe from the nearby island of Saint Barthélémy, backed by two rich freed men of color. He was expelled by the island's Governor General. In August 1822, he attempted to organize an invasion of Puerto Rico before fleeing to Curaçao, then Caracas. He died on 20 October 1828 in Arcis-sur-Aube.

== Legacy ==
Some sources claim that Jeannet-Oudin was a supporter of slavery, but this is contradicted by analysis of Jeannet's writings. This claim was seemingly started by Jean-Pierre Ramel and then spread by historians such as Pierre Pluchon.

Some sources claim that Jeannet-Oudin is Danton's nephew, but Jeannet-Oudin corrects that they were in fact cousins in his book Notes sur quelques passages du mémoire de Ramel.

Jeannet-Oudin is stated by some historians such as Jacques Adélaïde-Merlande and Pierre Pluchon as having fled to the United States after Danton's death. In truth Jeannet never commented on Danton's execution during the crisis of germinal year II, and later claimed that Danton had been treated fairly. This misconception appears to have also been started by Ramel.

Jeannet-Oudin was nicknamed manchot (sleeve) because he had one arm.
