= Henri Benoist =

Acadian soldier and Governor General of Guiana

Governor General of Guiana
- In office 4 January 1791 – 23 September 1792
- Preceded by: Jacques Martin de Bourgon
- Succeeded by: Charles Guillaume Vial d'Alais

Governor General of Guiana
- In office 14 April 1793 – 1794
- Preceded by: Charles Guillaume Vial d'Alais
- Succeeded by: François-Maurice de Cointet de Fillain

Personal details
- Born: 20 October 1736 Louisbourg, Acadia, New France
- Died: 1 April 1803 (aged 66) Cayenne, French Guiana
- Parent(s): Pierre Benoist; Marie Anne Jacob
- Occupation: Politician, military man
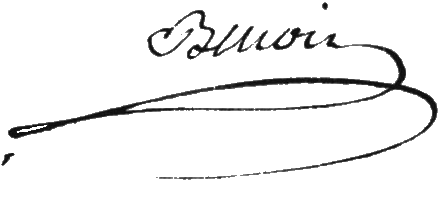
- Signature

Henri Benoist (20 October 1736 – 1803), also spelled as Henry, de Benoist and Benoît, was an Acadian military man and Governor General of Guiana.

== Biography ==
Henri Benoist was born on 20 October 1736 in Louisbourg, Acadia, New France, to Pierre Benoist and Marie Anne Jacob.

In 1746, Benoist was a cadet at the Colonial Troops of the Île-Royale. On 1 April 1754, he became an ensign. He was employed as an artillery lieutenant on 1 October 1757.

On 26 March 1763, Benoist was an infantry captain at Cayenne. He was promoted major of the Colonial Troops on 9 December 1764, and then major of the National Troops of Cayenne in December 1778.

=== First term ===
Governor General de Bourgon returned to France on 4 January 1791 and transferred his powers to Benoist, then leader of the battalion stationed in Guiana. Benoist avoided directly confronting the Colonial Assembly in its conflict against central control, but resisted some of its attempts at gaining power. When the Colonial Assembly attempted to replace the ordonnateur by an administrative assembly, Benoist sided with the ordonnateur. He ultimately won, when the Colonial Assembly restored the ordonnateur's powers on 5 March 1791.

The Civil Commissioneer Guillot and the new Governor General Charles Guillaume Vial d'Alais arrived in Cayenne on 23 September 1792.

=== Second term ===
The new Civil Commissioneer Jeannet-Oudin arrived in Cayenne on 14 April 1793, bringing a decree naming Benoist governor. The Colonial Assembly was hostile to Benoist for opposing them in the past, and they waged some kind of guerilla against the government, which was diplomatically solved by Jeannet-Oudin.

In June 1793, Jeannet-Oudin requisitioned 10% of all slaves to fortify Cayenne. Benoist led the works.

Benoist retired as Governor General after asking Jeannet-Oudin for permission in late 1794.

He died on 1 April 1803, in Cayenne.
