= Charles Gabriel Sivert =

French-Canadian military officer

Charles Gabriel Sébastien Sivert
- Born: December 1, 1725; Louisborg, Île-Royale, New France
- Died: January 5, 1791 (aged 65); Versailles, France
- Spouse: Anne-Claire Du Pont de Renon (m. 1755)
- Military career
- Allegiance: Kingdom of France
- Branch: Royal Navy
- Service years: 1735-1789
- Rank: Field Marshal
- Unit: Karrer Regiment
- Conflicts: Siege of Louisbourg (1745)
- Awards: Cross of St. Louis

Charles Gabriel Sébastien Sivert, Baron de l'Espérance (December 1, 1725 - January 5, 1791) was a French-Canadian Baron, colonial administrator and field marshal, and the Governor of Saint-Pierre-et-Miquelon from 1773-1776 and 1783-1785.

== Early life ==
Sivert was born Charles-Léopold-Ébérard de L'Espérance (1700-1738) and Marguerite Dangeac. Charles-Léopold-Ébérard was a Baron from the Holy Roman Empire and a second lieutenant in the Karrer Regiment and his mother, Marguerite Dangeac, was the daughter of a Lutheran captain named Gabriel Dangeac.

== Military Life ==
When Charles was 10-years-old he began his military career by becoming a cadet for the Karrer Regiment and was promoted to second ensign in 1742. Charles was present during the Siege of Louisbourg in 1745 and traveled to France in 1747 with Jacques-Pierre de Taffanel de La Jonquière. In 1754, Charles was promoted to lieutenant in the French Royal Navy. In 1755, Charles married Anne-Claire Du Pont de Renon the granddaugther of Michel Du Pont de Renon. Charles briefly returned to Louisbourg in 1755, but left in 1758 following the Second Siege of Louisbourg. In 1763, Charles was promoted to a Captain and was stationed at Miquelon for nine years with 20 other soldiers. In 1770, he received the Cross of St. Louis.

== Governor of Saint-Pierre-et-Miquelon ==
In 1773, Charles became the Governor of Saint-Pierre-et-Miquelon, succeeding his uncle, François-Gabriel d'Angeac (1708-1782). When Great Britain went to war with its American colonies, relations between Saint-Pierre-et-Miquelon and Newfoundland became critical. In 1776, an agreement with John Montagu, Governor of Newfoundland, settled two long-standing disputes between the two colonies: the French obtained permission to cut timber in Newfoundland and to fish in the strait separating the two territories. Trade relations between Saint-Pierre and New England ceased that year, but the island's situation would become even more precarious with France's alliance with the Americans in 1778. With only 31 soldiers and six cannons, Baron de l'Espérance could do nothing when, in September of 1778, an English squadron under the command of Commodore John Evans appeared off the island and demanded the French surrender. The governor capitulated with great pomp, after securing the honors of war. Once the inhabitants had left, the British looted and burned the settlement.

== Later life ==
In 1778, Charles became a brigadier in a colonial infantry regiment and was granted a pension of 4,000 écus and settled in Alsace. In 1784, Charles became a brigadier general of the Line infantry and traveled back to Saint-Pierre-et-Miquelon. In 1785, Sivert returned to France and retired from the military in April of 1789 and died on January 5, 1791 in Versailles.

== In popular culture ==
In 2014, Assassin's Creed Unity, Sivert as a prominent member of the Knights Templar and is assassinated in the Norte-Dame de Paris by Arno Dorian.
