= Louisbourg Garrison =

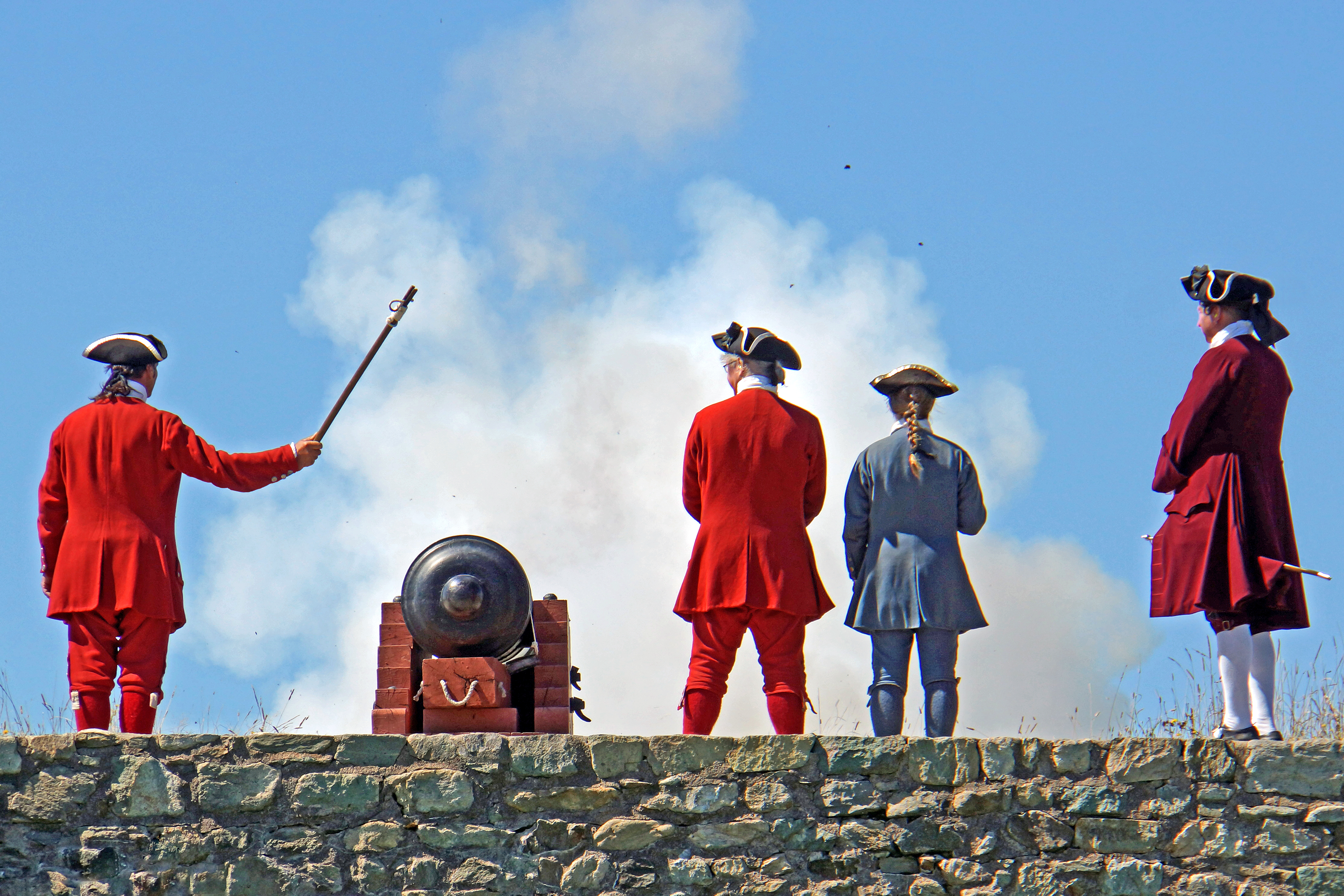
Historical reenactment of soldiers of the Louisbourg Garrison

The Louisbourg Garrison (which constituted the bulk of the Île-Royale Garrison) was a French body of troops stationed at the Fortress of Louisbourg protecting the town of Louisbourg, Île-Royale on Cape Breton Island, Nova Scotia. They were stationed there from 1717 to 1758, with the exception of a brief period (1745–1749) when the colony was under British control.

== Garrison ==
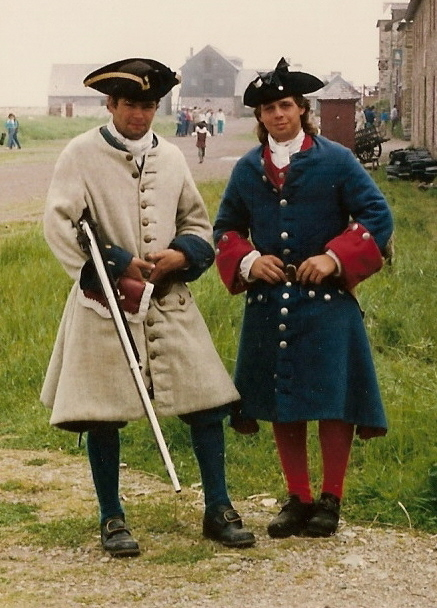
Historical reenactors of French marine and gunner of the canonnier-bombardier company at Louisbourg

The Louisbourg/Isle Royale Garrison was made up of nine companies of troupes de la marine, including a special artillery company. The garrison also included 150 men from the Swiss regiment de Karrer. At any given time there were between 525 and 575 men in all. Each company was commanded and administered by a fairly autonomous captain, subordinate to the etat-major. Conditions for the soldiers were not good even at their best, which, however, were no worse than many other eighteenth century soldiers. When they did not receive their prescribed rations they were forced to hunt for food. Moreover, although they were supposed to receive an annual issue of clothing, this was not always the case.

== Swiss Karrer Regiment ==
The Swiss regiment de Karrer in the Louisbourg Garrison was a considerably complicating element in the town of Louisbourg due to its different organization than the French companies (operating as a larger unit with three subaltern officers and nearly 150 men under the command of a captaine-lieutenant) and its special status (notably in the area of judicial autonomy).

== 1744 Mutiny ==
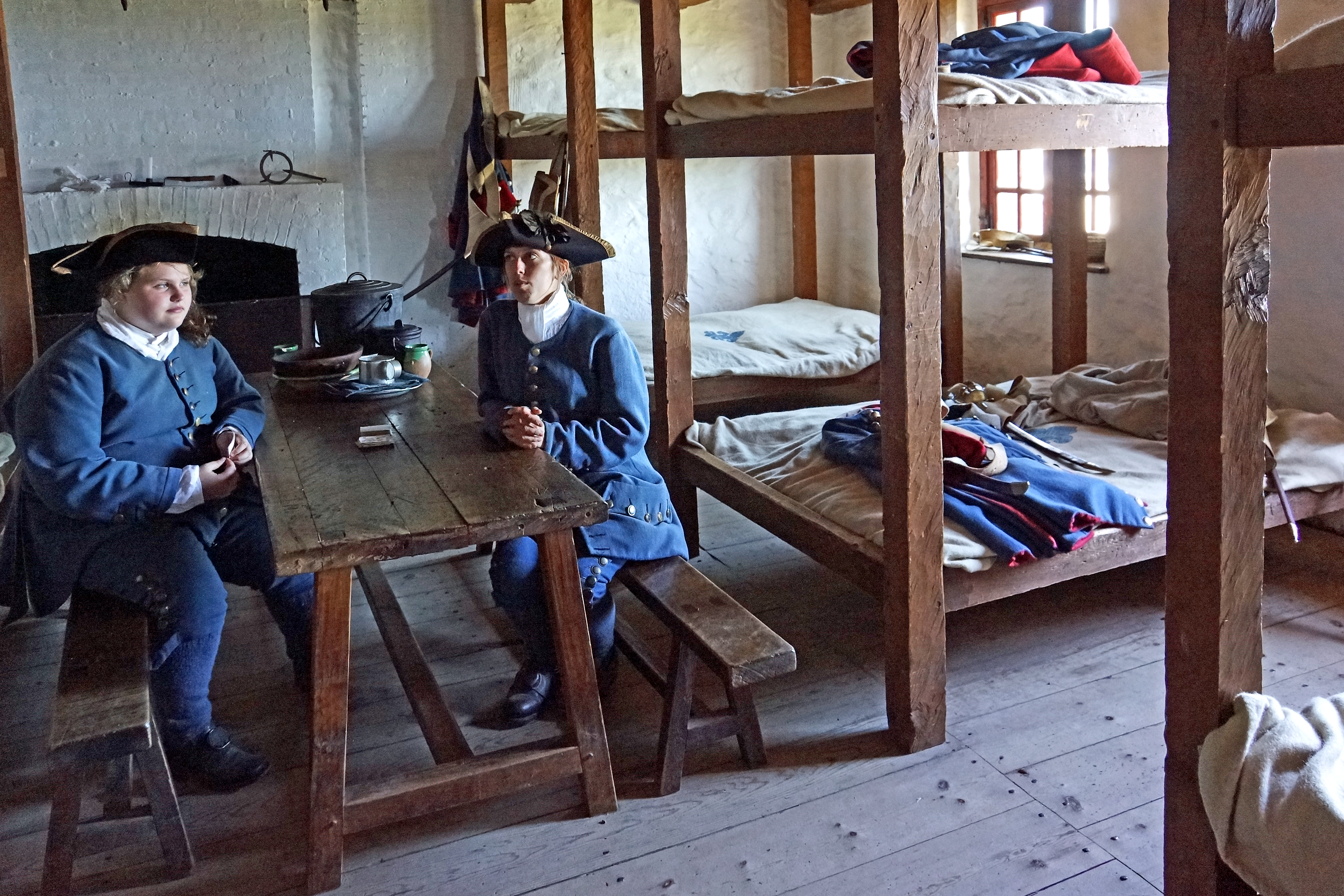
Barracks room

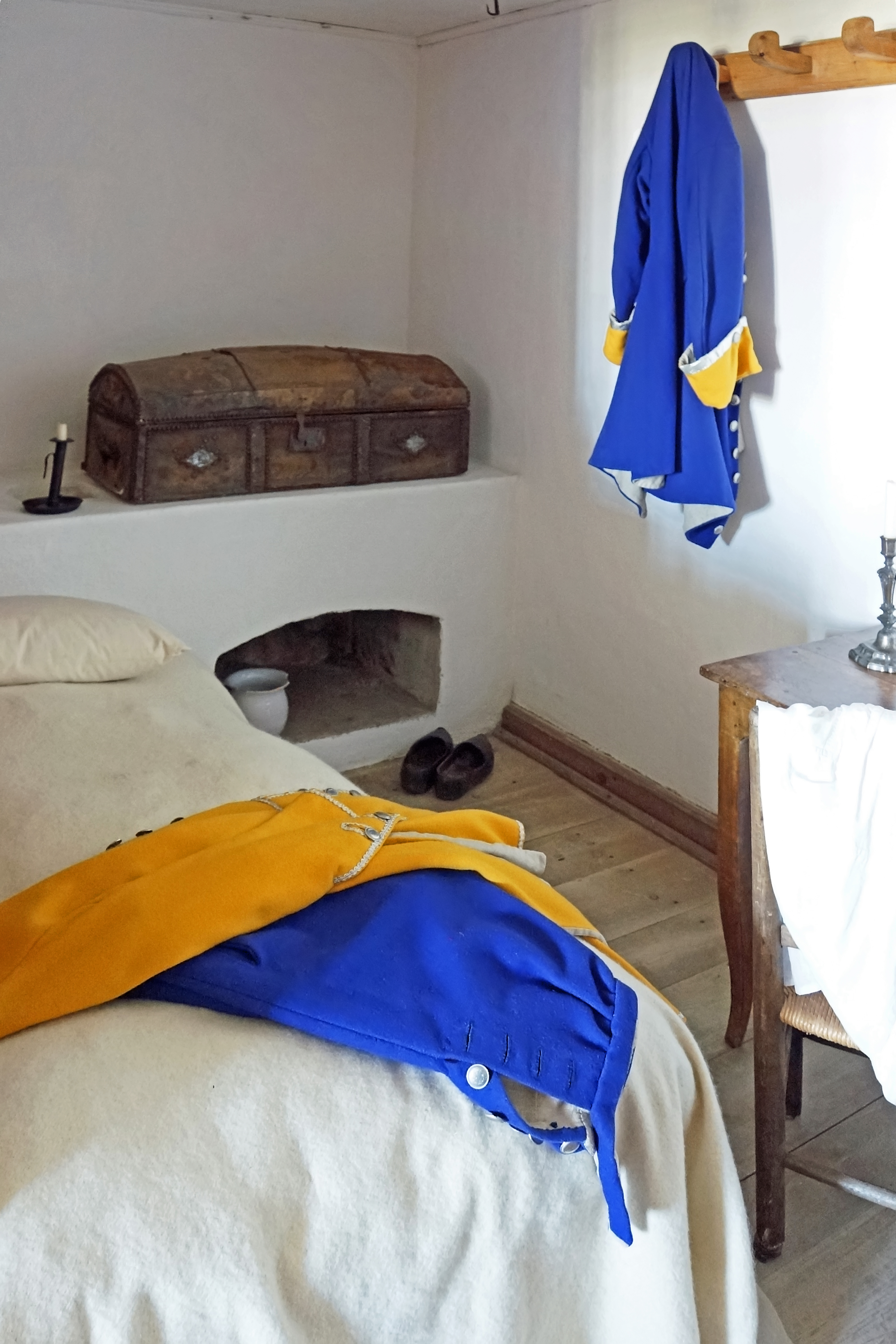
Officer's bedroom

King George's War broke out in the spring of 1744 between France and Great Britain. The war led French traders to be reluctant in sending ships full of commodities to New France for fear of the vessels' capture. This led to a shortage of food and resources for the soldiers and population within the town. In the spring of 1744, the French held several British soldiers captive at Louisbourg, worsening the shortages. In reaction, the government in Louisbourg cut the garrison's pay and reduced their rations. What food the men did receive was dismal. Bakers used rotten flour to make bread, described as being completely inedible. What good flour the government had was kept in the storehouse and sold to the civilian population of the town.

On December 27, 1744, the men assembled in the Courtyard near the King's Bastion and formally informed their superiors of their major grievances: being fed stale vegetables; forced to do unpaid labor for the benefit of the King and private citizens; and owed compensation for participating in an expedition against Canso earlier in the year, plus the booty they were promised but never received. These grievances were essentially complaints about conditions and compensation owed the men, not their military command.

Following their declaration, the soldiers seized control of the town and fort of Île-Royale. In the ensuing days, the rebels' control of the town caused great anxiety amongst the civilian population. Shopkeepers and artisans were threatened at swordpoint to sell their goods at what the mutineers regarded a "fair price". The colonial authorities could not call in reinforcements to put down the revolt because of British control of the seas and access to Canada being blocked by the river being frozen over.

On May 11, 1745, six months after the mutiny had begun, Louisbourg came under attack by the British. Francois Bigot, the financial commissary of Louisbourg, convinced the leaders of the mutiny to stop the rebellion and rejoin with their officers to fight off the invaders. In spite of this, the fifty-five-day siege ended with the French surrender of the fort and evacuation of the garrison. The leaders of the mutiny were court-martialed for the rebellion and several condemned to death. The Swiss Karrer regiment did not return to Louisbourg when the French regained control in 1749.

== Misdemeanors, infractions, and punishments ==
Misdemeanors were common in the Louisbourg garrison. Studies show that during a nineteen-month period between 1752 and 1753 there were over 1196 infractions, or about 63 offenses a month. Common violations included public drunkenness, uniform or equipment infractions, incidents of disobedience or lack of respect, infractions in the barracks rooms, absences, incidents of violence or noise, blasphemy or swearing, and theft or illegal sale of goods.

One of the most serious crimes was desertion, described by a garrison officer as an "incurable illness". Prior to 1717, a French soldier who deserted to the forest would be punished by service in the Mediterranean galleys; a desertion to an English colony would result in execution. After 1717, all deserters were sentenced to death.

== See also ==
- Military history of Nova Scotia
