= Jacques Martin de Bourgon =

French military man and colonial governor

Governor of Dominique
- In office 1 March 1781 – 1782
- Preceded by: Marie-Charles du Chilleau
- Succeeded by: M. de Beaupré

Governor of Guiana
- In office 14 June 1789 – 5 January 1791
- Preceded by: Charles Guillaume Vial d'Alais
- Succeeded by: Henri Benoist

Personal details
- Born: 7 June 1742 Château de Bourgon, Angoumois
- Died: 1820 or after

Jacques Martin de Bourgon (7 June 1742 – 1820 or after) was a French soldier, Governor of Dominique and Governor of Guiana.

== Early life ==
Jacques Martin de Bourgon was born on the 7 June 1742 at the Château de Bourgon, in Angoumois, France.

== Career ==
=== Military service ===
On 3 September 1750, he enrolled as an ensign in the Bourgogne Regiment. He became lieutenant on 27 April 1754, and captain on 11 August 1758. In Corsica, he commanded a company of volunteers, served in two campaigns and was wounded by a gunshot in the face.

He was named lieutenant-colonel of the Guadeloupe Regiment on 18 August 1772, and knight of Saint-Louis on 4 November 1774. On the same date two years later, he became a colonel. He fought as part of the naval army around the Windward Islands when Saint Lucia was attacked by the English. He was named lieutenant du roi of the forts Bourbon and Saint-Louis in Martinique on 10 June 1780.

=== Governor of Dominique ===
On 1 March 1781, he was made Governor of Dominique.

The colony was taken by the English, and he was made second officer of Martinique. He was made maréchal-de-camp on 11 August 1788.

=== Governor of Guiana ===
He was named Governor of Guyana on 14 June 1789. He was Governor when the French revolution erupted. After receiving the law of 8 March 1790, he organized an election for the Colonial Assembly. In November, he abolished corporal punishment in the military on soldiers' request. Bourgon secretly fomented upheavals against the elected members of the Colonial Assembly.

Bourgon became embroiled in a conflict with the Colonial Assembly, which progressively appropriated the State's power for its newly created municipality of Cayenne. He initially had the support of the battalion stationed at Cayenne, but lost it after the soldiers fraternized with the citizen guard in late November while quelling a slave revolt.

Bourgon, who had already asked to be recalled (for health reasons) left Guyana permanently in early January. He left the commander of the battalion, de Benoît, in charge.

== Legacy ==
He returned in France by leave on 9 June 1791. He was not threatened by the Reign of terror, despite slander by the representant of Guiana to the Convention, Pomme. He retired as maréchal-de-camp on 10 August 1792. In 1820, he was president of the paternal committee of the knights of Saint-Louis, at Angoulème, where he lived.
