= Franz Josef von Hallwyl =

Swiss military officer (1719–1785)

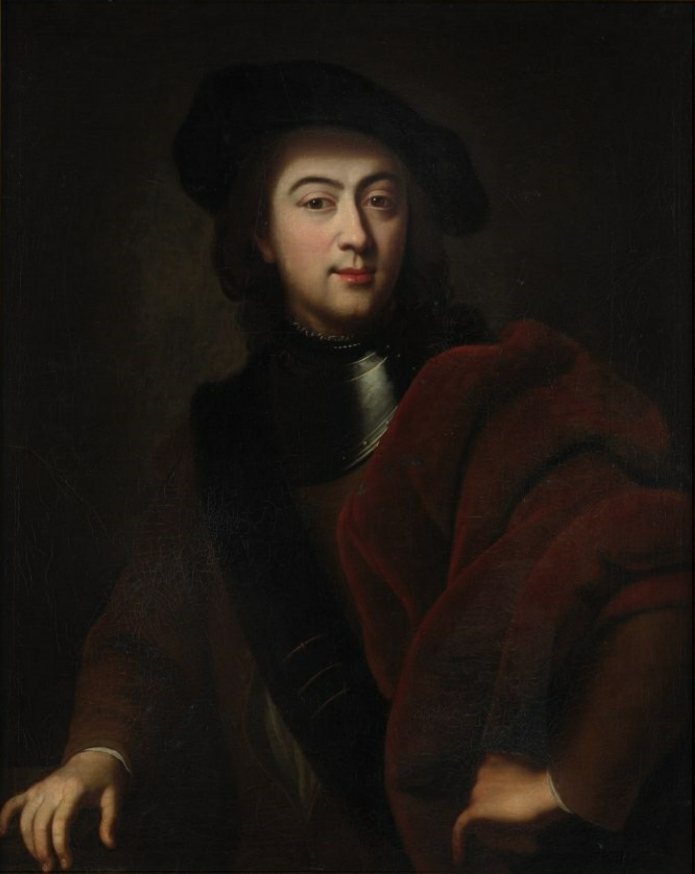
Anonymous portrait, c. 1757

Franz Josef von Hallwyl (2 September 1719 – 6 April or 7 May 1785) was a Swiss mercenary in the service of France who reached the rank of maréchal de camp.

== Biography ==
Hallwyl was born on 2 September 1719 in Solothurn, in the Swiss canton of Solothurn, into the noble Hallwyl family. He was the son Abraham Gabriel von Hallwyl, a lieutenant-colonel in French service and commander of Thann, and Anna Franziska de Tayac, a native of Thann. Hallwyl began his military career in 1733, as a cadet in the French Army's Royal Piedmont cavalry regiment. Appointed ensign in the Swiss Guards in 1740, Hallwyl served as an officer in the War of the Austrian Succession, seeing combat in Italy, Flanders and Germany. He was made a knight of the Order of Saint Louis for his distinguished service at the Battle of Fontenoy in 1745.

In 1752, Hallwyl was made colonel of the Karrer Regiment, a Swiss mercenary infantry unit, which was henceforth known as the Hallwyl Regiment. He remained with the colonel's company at the depot in Rochefort while the rest of the regiment was stationed overseas in Saint-Domingue. Hallwyl married Marie Thérèse de Mydorge, likely from Aix-en-Provence, in 1757. He was promoted to brigadier in 1760, to maréchal de camp in 1762, and was created a French count.

After the dissolution his regiment in 1763, Hallwyl received an annual pension of 20,000 livres from the French Crown. King Stanisław II August of Poland made him a knight of the Order of the White Eagle in 1777. In 1782, Hallwyl was appointed military commander of Colmar, where he died on 6 April or 7 May 1785, aged 66.
