= Louis-François Jeannet =

Louis-François Jeannet (5 November 1768 in Arcis-sur-Aube – 23 July 1832 in Bourg) was a French general.

Born to a merchant family and brother of Georges Nicolas Jeannet-Oudin, Jeannet joined the Army on 10 August 1784 in the Royal-Infanterie. At the outbreak of the French Revolution, he joined a battalion of National Volunteers, rising to sous-lieutenant in the 4th Dragoon regiment on 4 April 1792, full lieutenant in August, and captain on 15 October in the Légion des Ardennes.

Jeannet took part in the Battle of Jemappes, where he was wounded. He was promoted to Chef d’escadron (major) in the 16e Régiment de chasseurs à cheval, and served as an aid to general Picot-Dampierre in the Army of the North, taking part in the Battle of Famars. He was promoted to colonel on 7 September 1793.

Jeannet was then transferred to the Army of the Alps as chief of staff to general Kellermann. He served in the Italian campaigns of the French Revolutionary Wars, and captained the National Guard for the departments of Ain, Isère and Mont-Blanc.

In 1796, he was transferred to the Armée de Hollande.

On 1 October 1799, Jeannet was sent to Guadeloupe, and promoted to acting brigadier general on 14 juillet 1800.

Jeannet returned to France on 5 July 1801 aboard the frigate Cornélie, and retired. In 1810, he took up his commission again, serving in Holland, and in Spain during the Peninsular War. He distinguished himself at the Battle of Vitoria on 21 June 1813, and was made a Knight of the Legion of Honour on 1 September 1813. He took part in the Battle of Brienne (29 January 1814), of Montmirail (11 February) and of Arcis-sur-Aube (20 March). On 15 May, his commissioned as a brigadier general was confirmed.

At the Bourbon Restauration in 1814, he was forced to retire, and was appointed Knight of the Order of Saint-Louis on 13 February 1815. During the Hundred Days, and put in charge of the département of Ain. After the Battle of Waterloo, he retreated behind the Loire river and attempted to obtain a military commission again, attempting the raise battalions of Federates in Ain with the help of prefect Jean-Jacques Baude, but he had to retire again.

== Notes and references ==
- Biographie universelle, ancienne et moderne, Joseph Fr. Michaud and Louis Gabriel Michaud, Michaud, 1841

vol. 68

- Bonapartists in the Borderlands: French Exiles And Refugees on the Gulf Coast, 1815-1835, Rafe Blaufarb, University of Alabama Press, 2005 - 302 pages, p.207
- Société d'Emulation de l'Ain Un général de l'Ain méconnu
- Les Antilles françaises, particulièrement la Guadeloupe, depuis leur découverte jusqu'au 1er janvier 1823, colonel Eugène-Edouard Boyer-Peyreleau, Ladvocat, 1826 p.78
- LEONORE (database of recipients of the LEgion of Honour), entry Louis-François Jeannet
