= Franz Adam Karrer =

- Born: François Adam Karrer; 22 November 1666; Landser, Haut-Rhin, Alsace
- Died: 3 May 1740 (aged 73); Rochefort, Charente-Maritime, Poitou-Charentes, France
- Other name: Frantz Adam Karrer
- Spouse: Johanna Marguerite de Voile
- Military career
- Allegiance: France
- Service years: 1686 – 1736
- Rank: Brigadier
- Commands: Swiss regiment de Karrer

Franz Adam Karrer (1666 – 1740) was a Swiss officer, brigadier in French service, and founder and first colonel-proprietor of the Swiss regiment de Karrer on 15 December 1719. He became a Knight of the Order of Saint Louis in 1709.

== Military career ==
Karrer became officer cadet in an independent company in French service in 1686 and was commissioned as an ensign in the Swiss regiment von Salis-Soglio in French service in 1691. From there he became a lieutenant in 1693, and captain-lieutenant in 1698. Also in 1698, he became commanding officer of a half-company, eventually becoming proprietor of a half-company 1709 and captain of grenadiers 1710. Karrer entered a capitulation with the King of France on 15 December 1719, raising a regiment of foot for French service, the Régiment de Karrer, becoming colonel in 1720, and brigadier in 1734. In 1736 he transferred the proprietorship of the regiment to his son Ludwig Ignaz Karrer.

== Personal life ==
Karrer was born in Landser, Haut-Rhin, Alsace on 22 November 1666. He was married to Johanna Marguerite de Voile before 1703, the daughter of a bailiff (chief court official) in Alsace. He died on 3 May 1740 in Rochefort, Charente-Maritime, Poitou-Charentes, France.
