= 1st National Battalion of French Guiana =

1st National Battalion of Guiana
- 1^{er} bataillon national de la Guyane française
- Active: 7 April 1795–1798
- Country: France (French Guiana)
- Size: 480 men

The 1st National Battalion of French Guiana (French: 1^{er} bataillon national de la Guyane française) was a military unit in French Guiana active from 1795 to 1798.

== History ==
=== Formation ===
In March 1795, the council of war of Guiana was assembled in response to Portuguese hostilities. Ships from Portuguese Para were seen around Guiana's coast, troops were disembarked in the canton of Oyapock and the Portuguese kidnapped three citizens in said canton. The governor general Cointet proposed that a black battalion be created, arguing that the 2nd Battalion of the 53rd Infantry Regiment alone could not defend the colony and that the national guard lacked training and discipline. Cointet sought to gain the trust of Guiana's black citizens and to contain the white population by this measure, and likely did not believe that the colony was seriously threatened by the Portuguese.

The project faced strong opposition. Multiple council members were opposed, including the ordonnateur Corio, who opposed the project because it was costly and would reduce the agricultural workforce, and the geographer Mentelle. Many whites sent strong protests to Paris. The mayor of Cayenne, Lanne, was the project's fiercest opponent, refusing to draft troops or send cash vouchers to buy equipment.

=== Operational history ===
Despite these protests, the 1st National Battalion of Guiana was created on 7 April 1795. It was led by Captain Lerch and other white officers from the 53rd Regiment.

It helped thwart an insurrection on 27 January 1796.

=== Merge ===
In 1798, the 1st National Battalion of Guiana was merged with the 53rd Regiment into a single, separate unit. It, however, still existed in practice during the Directory in the form of black companies in Guiana's single military unit and a black gendarmerie.

== Uniform ==
The 1st National Battalion of Guiana's initial uniform was very plain. Each man had two grey linen smocks, two pairs of breeches and a straw hat. A year later, the troops were provided with a piece of blue cloth, ten pieces of Irish linen and three hundred of yellow nankeen with shoes and stockings.

== Commanders ==
1795-1798 Captain Lerch

1798 Stephan

== Other links ==
- Proclamation concernant l'organisation du I^{er} bataillon national de la Guyane française (imprimé). 2 p.
