= Pierre François Lambert Lamoureux de la Gennetière =

French military officer and Governor General of Guiana (b. 1740 – d. 1796)

Governor General of Guiana
- In office 1796 – 30 June 1796
- Preceded by: François-Maurice de Cointet de Fillain
- Succeeded by: Vacancy (until 1802); Victor Hugues (?)

Personal details
- Born: 25 September 1740 Givet, Ardennes, Kingdom of France
- Died: 30 June 1796 (aged 55) Cayenne, French Guiana

Pierre François Lambert Lamoureux de la Gennetière (25 September 1740 – 30 June 1796) was a French military officer and Governor of Guiana in 1796.

== Biography ==
Pierre François Lambert Lamoureux de la Gennetière was born on 25 September 1740 in Givet, Ardennes, France. He was nephew to the military man and journalist Pierre Nicolas Coste d'Arnobat.

=== Military career ===
Lamoureux de la Gennetière was an ensign at the Condé infantry regiment on 12 April 1759. He fought in Germany between 1759 and 1762, receiving 5 bullets in his clothing and a bruise on his breast at the Battle of Minden. He became lieutenant at the Condé infantry regiment on 13 March 1760 and then lieutenant of the Condé legion on 21 May 1766. He received a bonus of 300 livres on 17 June 1770.

Pierre François Lambert left military service after having financial troubles in 1774. He was attached as lieutenant to the regiment of Vivarais on 9 December 1776. He received a bonus of 500 livres on 4 July 1777. He was attached as captain to the infantry regiment of Gâtinais on 28 August 1777. He obtained a 400 livres bonus on 28 November 1777. He was attached to the Cévennes mounted chasseurs regiment on 8 April 1779.

Pierre François Lambert then hid at the quartier du Temple to avoid debtors' prison after he amassed debts due to familial misfortunes and a banker's bad affairs. He obtained a bonus of 500 livres on 25 October 1785, and then fully left service on 9 December 1785.

He enrolled at the Paris national guard at the battalion of the Fathers of Nazareth on 18 August 1789. He asked to rejoin the army and was immediately named maréchal de camp of the Army of the Pyrenees on 12 October 1792. He became commandant of the camp of Saint-Jean-Pied-de-Port on 19 March 1793. He wasn't included in the general staff reorganizations of 15 May 1793. He was wounded and taken prisoner at the Battle of Château-Pignon on 6 June 1793. After peace was signed, he rejoined the headquarter of the Army of the Western Pyrenees on 19 September 1795. He was reintegred as brigade general and named Governor of French Guiana on 25 January 1796. He was named division general on 1 February 1796.

=== Governor of French Guiana ===
He left Rochefort for French Guiana.

He suffered from a fever for nine days and then died on 30 June 1796 in Cayenne. The post of Governor General of Guiana was then left vacant until 1802.

In total, he had four children.
