= Frédéric Joseph Guillot =

Civil Commissioner of Guiana
- In office 23 September 1792 – 1793
- Preceded by: Henri Benoist (as acting governor)
- Succeeded by: Georges Nicolas Jeannet-Oudin

Personal details
- Born: 17 June 1736 Versailles, Yvelines, Kingdom of France
- Died: 31 May 1813 (aged 76) Paris, French Empire

Frédéric Joseph Guillot (17 June 1736 – 31 May 1813) was a French naval officer and Civil Commissioner of Guiana.

== Early life ==
Frédéric Joseph Guillot was born on the 17 June 1736 at Versailles, Yvelines to Jean-Joseph Guillot, general commissary of the Navy, and Marie-Jeanne L'heureux de Folleville.

== Career ==
=== Naval career (1753–1792) ===
From 1753 to 1756, Guillot was employed in his father's Saint-Malo office. He became an écrivain ordinaire de la Marine on 1 October 1756 and a petit commissaire de la Marine on 12 June 1757. In 1757, he served at the court with his father. In 1758, Guillot was affected to Brest and given various duties there. He was made ordinary commissioner of the Navy on 10 September 1763.

In 1764, he was sent to England to attempt repatriating French prisoners of war. In the same year, he also reviewed naval personnel in the department of Saint-Malo under his father's direction. In 1765, he returned to Brest and was named chef du détail de l’inspection des vivres and second des constructions navales. He became chef du détail des constructions navales on the next year. In January 1767, he was stationed at Saint-Malo to assist his father and replace him if he died. On 10 February 1768, after his father's death, he was named chef du détail of the department of Saint-Malo.

Guillot was temporarily removed from service due to the ordinance of 27 September 1776. On 1 January 1777, he became ordinary commissioner of ports and arsenals, then general commissioner of ports and arsenals at Saint-Malo on 29 May 1779, ordonnateur at Bordeaux on 1 July 1781 and intendant of the Navy at Brest on 17 November 1781. On the same day, he became an honorary member of the Académie royale de la Marine.

He retired on 9 May 1785 for health reasons, and then rejoined service as a general commissary of the Navy at Saint-Malo in 1789.

=== Governor of Guiana (1792–1793) ===
In July 1792, the Legislative Assembly confirmed the annulation of the expulsions by the Colonial Assembly of Guiana, that the law of 4 April 1792 instituting the equality of men was to be enforced and that the Colonial assembly had to be reorganized, and thus reelected. To apply these decisions, the ministère de la Marine named Guillot Civil Commissioner of Guiana on 3 June 1792.

He departed from Lorient in direction of Cayenne on board of the frigate Nymphe. On 23 September 1792, he arrived in Cayenne alongside the new governor Charles Guillaume Vial d'Alais and a bataillon of the 53e Régiment, and started exercising his functions as Civil Commissioner on the same day. Unbeknownst to Guillot and d'Alais, the Republic had taken power in France by their arrival.

On 28 September 1792, Guillot had the habitations (plantations) confiscated by the municipality of Cayenne returned to the colonial government. Guillot also managed to have the stationed undisciplined battalion send back to France, but the new battalion, the regiment d'Alsace, also showed signs of indiscipline.

Guillot had Guiana completely cut contact with Martinique and Guadeloupe as they were in open rebellion against the Republic since September 1792.

Elections for the Colonial Assembly took place on 11 November, and most of its members were reelected. Guillot found irregularities; in three parishes, not all electors were able to vote.

Guillot and d'Alais's relationship strained after disagreements on the matter of the returned expulsed, and d'Alais increasingly sided with the Colonial Assembly leaders. After the election, d'Alais ratified the Colonial Assembly's local constitution against Guillot's wishes.

He was recalled to France alongside d'Alais in 1793. By then, Guillot had asserted the new French laws over the colony's 1791 laws and thus neutralized the Colonial Assembly's autonomist push.

== Later life ==
Guillot was taken prisoner by the British during his trip back to France. He was detained in England and then Martinique, before being released and arriving in France in 1802.

Until his death, he would remain a simple employee of the Ministère de la Marine. He died on 31 May 1813 in Paris.
