= Representativity (politics) =

Representativity is a measure of how well a deliberative decisionmaking process or body represents various constituency groups. It can be applied to legislatures in a representative democracy, election methods, legislative redistricting, statistical sampling, or selection of members of committees, cabinets, juries, or judicial panels. There is no single standard or formula on which everyone can agree, and much political or leadership debate can develop among contending proposals for how best to design and conduct a body that is most representative, without impairing its ability to make timely decisions.

It differs from the related concept of diversity in that it is not just about allowing many views to be heard, but also to exercise influence in rough proportion to their numbers.

== United States ==
In its federal system, U.S. senators represent entire states, but have equal votes in the U.S. Senate, whereas U.S. representatives each represent a single-member district, as a matter of current established practice, the boundaries of which are drawn to include equal numbers of individuals based on the last census. Within the states, some elected officials such as the governor represent the entire state, while members of the houses of the state legislatures represent districts drawn to include equal numbers of individuals. Each of these systems of representation have a different level and kind of representativity.

== See also ==
- Sortition
- Demarchy
- Representative (disambiguation)
