= Étienne-Laurent-Pierre Burnel =

French colonial administrator

Étienne Laurent Pierre Burnel (22 May 1762 – 12 July 1835) was a French colonial administrator. He was governor of French Guiana.

== Life ==
Étienne Laurent Pierre Burnel was born in Rennes, Brittany on 22 May 1762 to a bourgeois family of modest wealth. His father Pierre-Étienne Burnel was a magistrate who spent much of his career in Guiana..

Burnel did his studies at the Jesuit college in Rennes, during which he performed well. At age 18, he enrolled in the régiment de Béarn. He served a few years under the command of the chevalier de Payan, for whom he worked as secretary.

On 16 November 1790, he arrived at the Isle de France (Mauritius), seeking fortune. On 1 January 1791 he founded the newspaper Le Journal politique et littéraire, editing it for 18 months. In 1791, Burnel was offered to be 'perpetual secretary' of the Colonial Assembly. In late 1792, he joined the bar at Port Louis. Burnel came to be general correspondent and 'avocat d'affaires' for the Colonial Assembly at Pondicherry. He became a member of the local directory in 1794.

Burnel chartered a ship under an American flag for commercial purposes, which he embarked in March 1794 in direction of France. The ship was captured by the British and declared as a legitimate prize in a prize court, ruining Burnel. He was dropped off at an American port and visited Boston, New York City, Philadelphia, Baltimore and Alexandria, where he met several French émigrés such as Talleyrand. While in New York, Burnel learned of 9 Thermidor.

Back in France, in 1795 the French Directory put Burnel in command of a mission to Belgium, where apparently had an unspecified position of importance. He spent two months "leading the state's registers without being an accountant" in Brussels.

In 1796 he and René Gaston Baco de La Chapelle were sent to Île de France and Île Bourbon (now Réunion) as government agents charged with abolishing slavery. Arriving at Port Louis on 18 June 1796, they were both expelled by the colonists, who had decided to resist the abolition.

=== Governor of Guiana ===
In 1798, the government sent him to Guiana to replace Georges Nicolas Jeannet-Oudin, in part because of Jeannet-Oudin's own request, but also because of a change in policies. Signed by the minister for the navy Bruix but seemingly written by Lescallier, his orders gave him wide autonomy. Burnel was also tasked with changing cultivation regulations to a system where laborers gained a portion of the plantation's earnings instead of the current popular salaried work. Burnel would never change the cultivation regulations during his tenure as agent.

Arriving at Cayenne in November, he had to face the landowners' hostility to the central government and the numerous deportees, victims of the Thermidorian reaction (Billaud-Varenne) and the coup of 18 Fructidor (general Pichegru, Tronsson-Ducoudray, Laffon-Ladebat, Barbé-Marbois and Job Aymé). Barbé-Marbois attacked him in letters to his close friends in France, published 36 years later under the title Journal d'un déporté.

=== Later life ===
After 18 months as governor, he successfully requested a recall to France on health grounds. Arriving back in France after Napoleon's coup of 18 brumaire, he retired to private life. When Napoleon set up prefectures in 1800, some friends wished to put Burnel's name forward, but Burnel remained faithful to the Republic and opposed them. It was only during the French military disasters of 1812 and 1813 that he offered his services to Napoleon. He was rewarded with a pension of 6,000 francs. Denounced as a "former terrorist", a "septembriseur" and secretary to "Robespierre", he was convoked by the marquis de Vioménil, commander of the 13th military division, to whom he showed that the accusations were unfounded. He lived to see the July Revolution of 1830, before dying in Rennes on 12 July 1835 in Rennes.
