= Fortress of Louisbourg =

18th-century French fortress on Cape Breton Island, Nova Scotia, Canada

- Forteresse de Louisbourg (French)
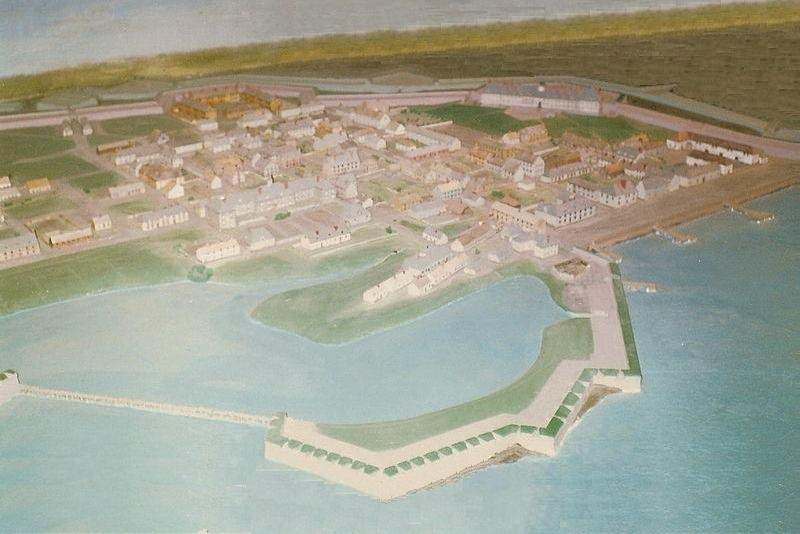
- Diorama of the Fortress of Louisbourg in 1758

- Location within Nova Scotia
- 45°53′33″N 59°59′06″W
- Location: 259 Park Service Rd, Louisbourg, Nova Scotia, Canada; B1C 2L2

History
- Built: 1713–1740

National Historic Site of Canada
- Official name: Fortress of Louisbourg National Historic Site
- Designated: 30 January 1920

The Fortress of Louisbourg (French: Forteresse de Louisbourg) is a tourist attraction as a National Historic Site and the location of a one-quarter partial reconstruction of an 18th-century French fortress at Louisbourg on Cape Breton Island, Nova Scotia. Its two sieges, especially that of 1758, were turning points in the Anglo-French struggle for what today is Canada.

The original settlement was founded in 1713 by settlers from Terre-Neuve, and initially called Havre à l'Anglois. Subsequently, the fishing port grew to become a major commercial port and a strongly defended fortress. The fortifications eventually surrounded the town. The walls were constructed mainly between 1720 and 1740. By the mid-1740s Louisbourg, named for Louis XIV of France, was one of the most extensive (and expensive) European fortifications constructed in North America.

The site was supported by two smaller garrisons on Île Royale located at present-day St. Peter's and Englishtown. The Fortress of Louisbourg suffered key weaknesses, since it was erected on low-lying ground commanded by nearby hills and its design was directed mainly toward sea-based assaults, leaving the land-facing defences relatively weak. A third weakness was that it was a long way from France or Quebec, from which reinforcements might be sent. It was captured by British colonists in 1745, and was a major bargaining chip in the negotiations leading to the 1748 treaty ending the War of the Austrian Succession. It was returned to the French in exchange for border towns in what is today Belgium. It was captured again in 1758 by British forces in the Seven Years' War, after which its fortifications were systematically destroyed by British engineers. The British continued to have a garrison at Louisbourg until 1768 but had abandoned the site by 1785.

The fortress and town were partially reconstructed, in a project that started in 1961 and continued into the 1970s. The head stonemason for this project was Ron Bovaird. This reconstruction work provided jobs for unemployed coal miners, but relied on expropriating an entire community known as West Louisbourg. Additional restoration was completed in 2018–2020 and again in 2022–2023 after Hurricane Fiona. The earlier of the two projects was intended to protect the site from rising water and to restore parts of the fortress.

The Fortress of Louisbourg National Historic site is operated by Parks Canada as a living history museum. The site stands as the largest reconstruction project in North America.

== History ==
French settlement on Île Royale (now Cape Breton Island) can be traced to the early 17th century following settlements in Acadia that were concentrated on Baie Française (now the Bay of Fundy) such as at Port-Royal and other locations in present-day peninsular Nova Scotia. A French settlement at Sainte Anne (now Englishtown) on the central east coast of Île Royale was established in 1629 and named Fort Sainte Anne, lasting until 1641. A fur trading post was established on the site from 1651 to 1659, but Île Royale languished under French rule as attention was focused on the St. Lawrence River/Great Lakes colony of Canada (which then comprised parts of what is now Quebec, Ontario, Michigan, Ohio, Indiana, Wisconsin and Illinois), Louisiana (which encompassed the current Mississippi Valley states and part of Texas), and the small agricultural settlements of mainland Acadia.

The Treaty of Utrecht in 1713 gave Britain control of part of Acadia (peninsular Nova Scotia) and Newfoundland; however, France maintained control of its colonies at Île Royale, Île Saint-Jean (now Prince Edward Island), Canada and Louisiana, with Île Royale being France's only territory directly on the Atlantic seaboard (which was controlled by Britain from Newfoundland to present-day South Carolina) and it was strategically close to important fishing grounds on the Grand Banks of Newfoundland, as well as being well placed for protecting the entrance to the Gulf of St. Lawrence.

In 1713, France set about constructing Port Dauphin and a limited naval support base at the former site of Fort Sainte-Anne; however, the winter icing conditions of the harbour led the French to choose another harbour on the southeastern part of Île Royale. The harbour, being ice-free and well protected, soon became a winter port for French naval forces on the Atlantic seaboard and they named it Havre Louisbourg after King Louis XIV.

=== First siege ===
Coloured engraving depicting the Siege of Louisbourg

The Fortress was besieged in 1745 by a New England force backed by a Royal Navy squadron. The New England attackers succeeded when the fortress capitulated on June 16, 1745. A major expedition by the French to recapture the fortress led by Jean-Baptiste de La Rochefoucauld de Roye, duc d'Anville, the following year was destroyed by storms, disease and British naval attacks before it ever reached the fortress. The British returned it to the French at the end of the War of Austrian Succession.

=== Louisbourg returned ===
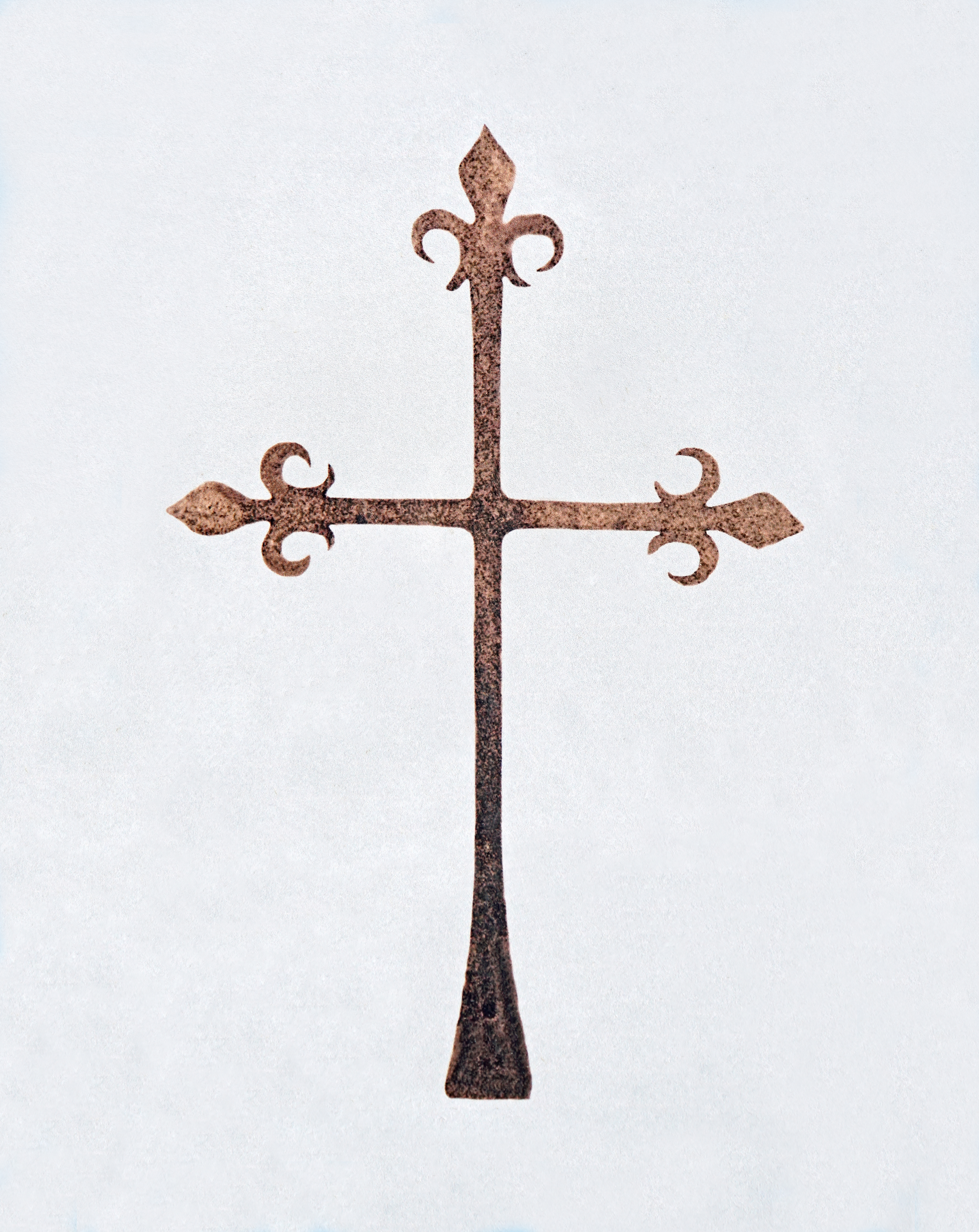
The Louisbourg Cross, on permanent loan to the fortress since 1995

In 1748, the Treaty of Aix-la-Chapelle, which ended the War of the Austrian Succession, restored Louisbourg to France in return for territory gained in the Austrian Netherlands and the British trading post at Madras in India. Maurepas, the ministre de la marine, was determined to have it back. He regarded the fortified harbour as essential to maintaining French dominance in the fisheries of the area. The disgust of the French in this transaction was matched by that of the English colonists.

The New England forces left, taking with them the famous Louisbourg Cross, which had hung in the fortress chapel. This cross was rediscovered in the Harvard University archives only in the latter half of the 20th century; it is now on long-term loan to the Louisbourg historic site.

Having given up Louisbourg, Britain in 1749 created its own fortified town on Chebucto Bay which they named Halifax. It soon became the largest Royal Navy base on the Atlantic coast and hosted large numbers of British army regulars. The 29th Regiment of Foot was stationed there; they cleared the land for the port and settlement.

=== Second siege ===
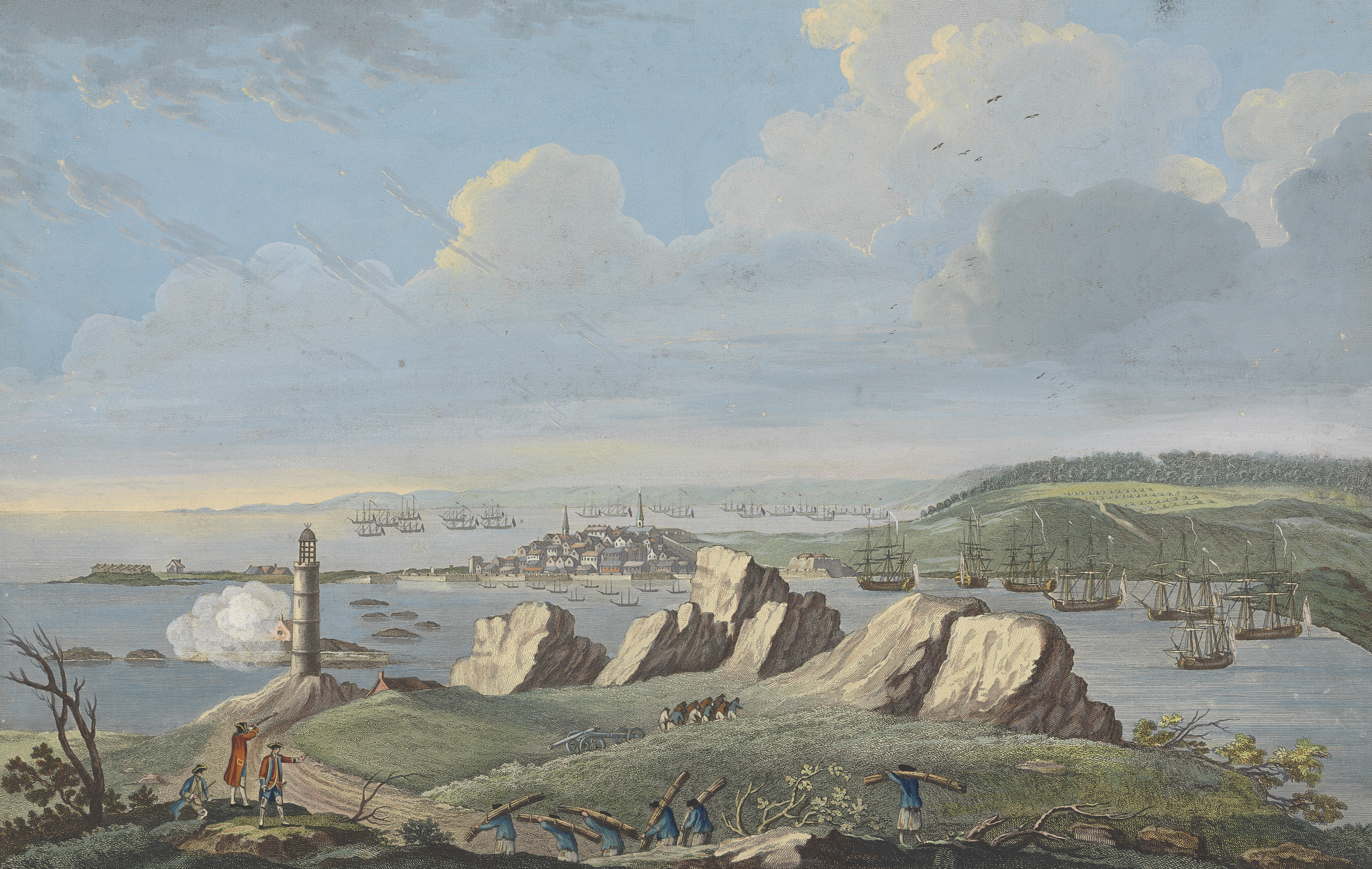
View of Louisbourg when the city was besieged by British forces in 1758

Britain's American colonies were expanding into areas claimed by France by the 1750s, and the efforts of French forces and their First Nation allies to seal off the westward passes and approaches through which American colonists could move west soon led to the skirmishes that developed into the French and Indian War in 1754. The conflict widened into the larger Seven Years' War by 1756, which involved all of the major European powers.

A large-scale French naval deployment in 1757 fended off an attempted assault by the British in 1757. However, inadequate naval support the following year allowed a large British combined operation led by Jeffrey Amherst to land for the 1758 Siege of Louisbourg which ended after a siege of six weeks on 26 July 1758, with a French surrender. The fortress was used by the British as a launching point for its 1759 Siege of Quebec that culminated in the Battle of the Plains of Abraham.

=== Governors ===
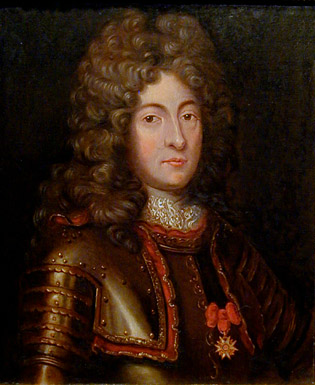
Philippe de Pastour de Costebelle, the first Governor of Île-Royale

- Philippe Pastour de Costebelle (1714–1717)
- Jacques L'Hermite (French Officer) (acting, 1714–1715)
- Joseph de St. Ovide, Monbeton de Brouillan (acting, 1716–1717; governor 1717–1739)
- Francois de Bourville (acting, 1723–1724; 1729–1731; 1737–39; 1740)
- Isaac-Louis de Forant (1739–1740)
- Jean-Baptiste Prévost du Quesnel (1740–1744)
- Louis Du Pont Duchambon de Vergor (acting, 1744–1745)
- Antoine Le Moyne de Châteauguay (1745)
- Peter Warren (1745–1746)
- Charles Knowles (1746–1747)
- Charles Watson (Royal Navy officer) (1748)
- Peregrine Thomas Hopson (1747–1749)
- Charles des Herbiers de La Ralière (1749–1751)
- Jean-Louis de Raymond (1751–1753)
- Charles Joseph D'Ailleboust (acting, 1753–54)
- Augustin de Boschenry de Drucour (1754–1758)

=== 20th century ===
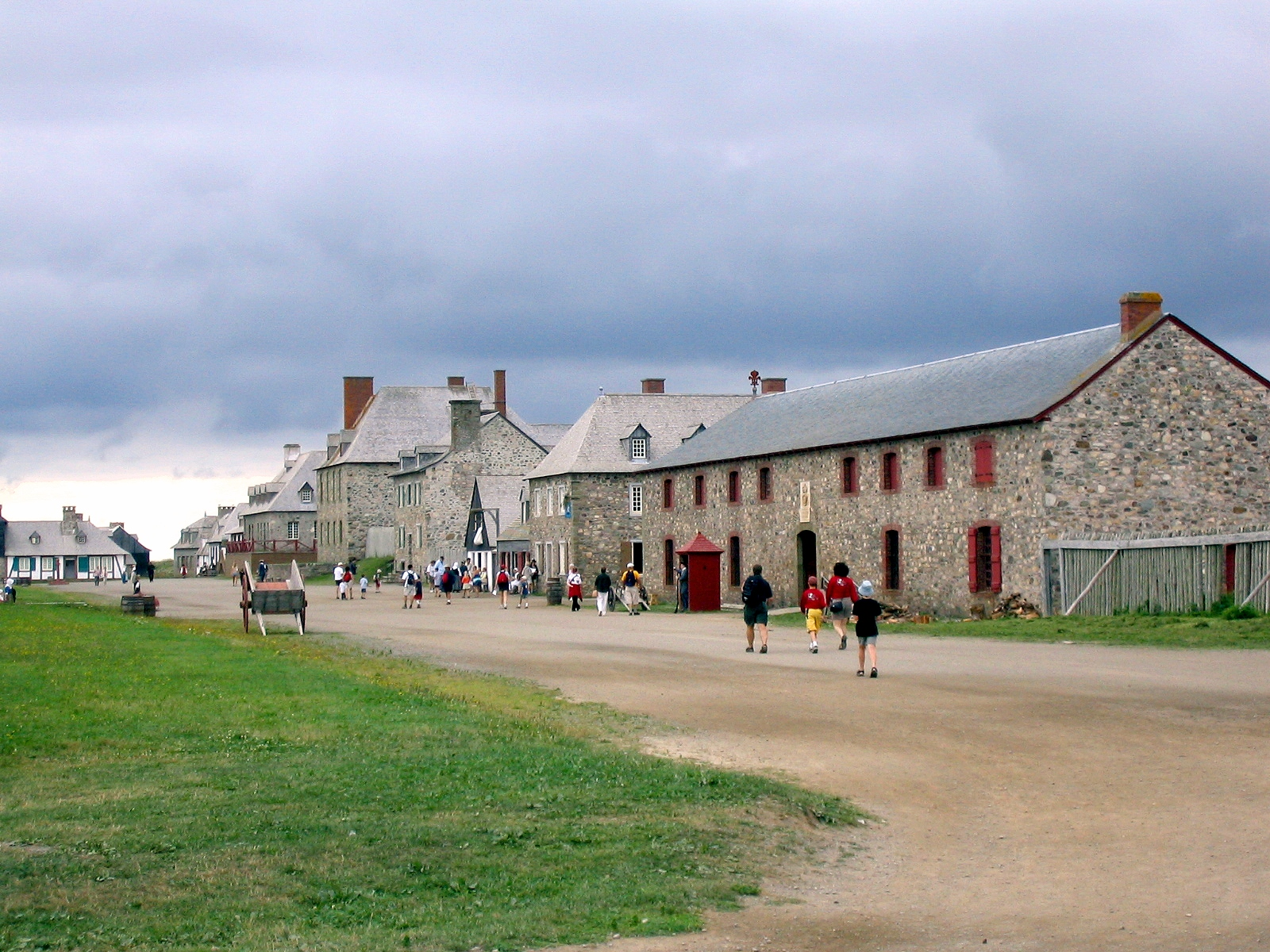
The Government of Canada rebuilt one-fifth of the town, and its fortifications; the multi-year work commenced in 1963.

The site of the fortress was designated a National Historic Site in 1920. In 1961, the government of Canada decided to undertake a historical reconstruction of one-fifth of the town and fortifications with the aim being to recreate Louisbourg as it would have been at its height in 1744. The $26 million project required an interdisciplinary effort by archeologists, historians, engineers, and architects. Some craftsmen came from other countries but most of the reconstruction work was completed by locals, including unemployed coal miners from the industrial Cape Breton area. Over the years, they constructed some 60 buildings and two bastions. Many of the workers learned 18th century French masonry techniques and other skills to create an accurate replica.

Dozens of researchers worked on the project over a span of five decades. They included British-born archeologists Bruce W. Fry and Charles Lindsay; and Canadian historians B. A. Balcom, Kenneth Donovan, Brenda Dunn, John Fortier, Margaret Fortier, Allan Greer, A. J. B. Johnston, Eric Krause, Anne Marie Lane Jonah, T.D. MacLean, Christopher Moore, Robert J. Morgan, Christian Pouyez, Gilles Proulx and many more. Among the architects, Yvon LeBlanc, one of the first Acadian architects, was responsible for most of the town-site buildings, with input from researchers who contributed to various committees. According to one source, accuracy was assured by a review of "750,000 pages of documents and 500 maps and plans have been copied from archives in France, England, Scotland, the United States and Canada".

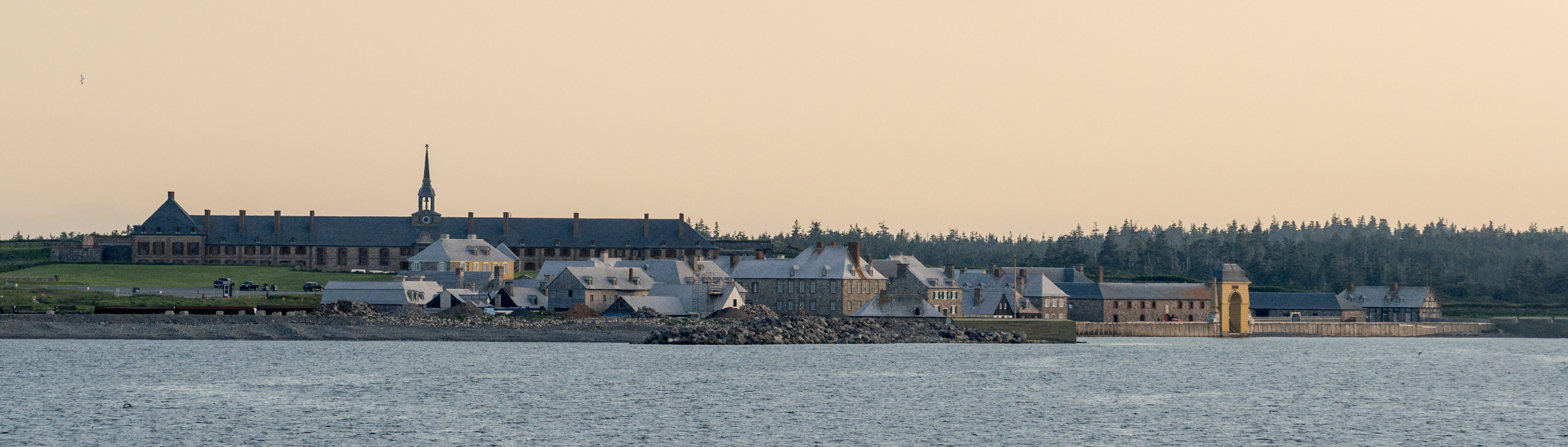
Panoramic view of the Fortress of Louisbourg from Louisbourg Harbour at sunset, showing the King's Bastion, the waterfront and the reconstructed fortifications.

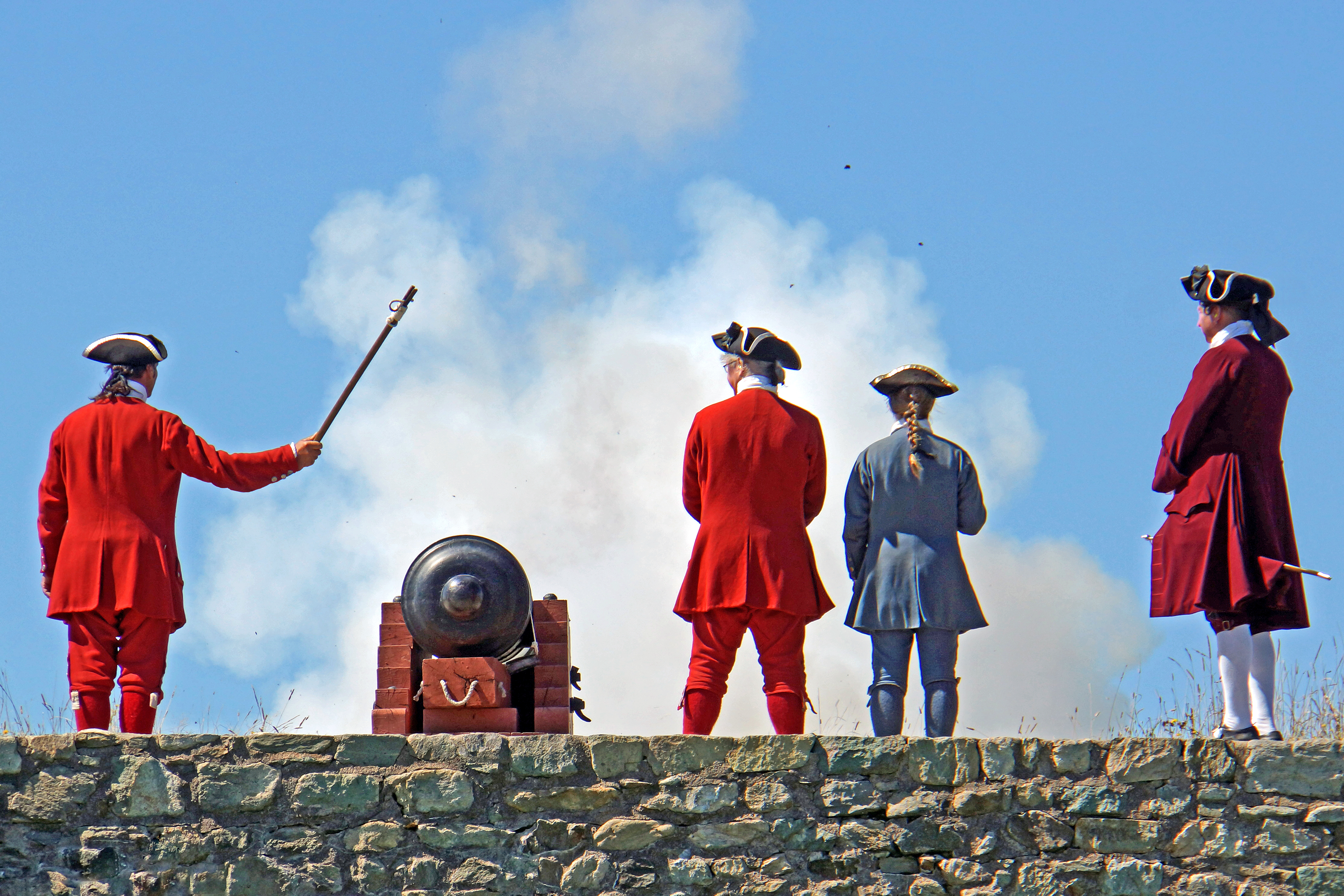
A demonstration of cannons used in the 18th century at the Fortress.

Today, the entire site of the fortress, including the one-fifth reconstruction, is the Fortress of Louisbourg National Historic Site of Canada, operated by Parks Canada. Offerings include guided and unguided tours, and the demonstration and explanation of period weapons, including muskets and a cannon, by enactors wearing period clothing. Children's programming includes puppet shows. The Museum / Caretakers Residence (built c. 1935–36) within the site is a Classified Federal Heritage Building. The fortress also greatly aided the local economy of the town of Louisbourg, as it struggled to diversify economically with the decline of the North Atlantic fishery and the decline of coal mining.

On 5 May 1995, Canada Post issued the 'Fortress of Louisbourg' series to mark the 275th anniversary of the official founding of the fortress, the 250th anniversary of the siege by the New Englanders, the 100th anniversary of the commemoration by the Society of Colonial Wars, and the 100th anniversary of the arrival of the Sydney and Louisburg Railway (S & L). The Fortress of Louisbourg series includes: 'The Harbour and Dauphin Gate', '18th Century Louisbourg'; 'The King's Bastion'; 'The King's Garden, Convent, Hospital, and British Barracks' and 'The Fortifications and Ruins Fronting the Sea and Rochfort Point'. The 43¢ stamps were designed by Rolf P. Harder.

The museum that operates from the Fortress is affiliated with: Canadian Museums Association, Canadian Heritage Information Network, and Virtual Museum of Canada.

== Fortified town ==
The Fortress of Louisbourg was the capital for the colony of Île-Royale, and was located on the Atlantic coast of Cape Breton Island near its southeastern point. The location for the fortress was chosen because it was easy to defend against British ships attempting to either block or attack the St. Lawrence River, at the time the only way to get goods to Canada and its cities of Quebec and Montreal. South of the fort, a reef provided a natural barrier, while a large island provided a good location for a battery. These defences forced British ships to enter the harbour via a 500-foot (150 m) channel. The fort was built to protect and provide a base for France's lucrative North American fishery and to protect Quebec City from British invasions. For this reason, it has been given the nicknames ‘Gibraltar of the North’ or the ‘Dunkirk of America.’ The fort was also built to protect France's hold on one of the richest fishing grounds in the world, the Grand Banks. One hundred and sixteen men, ten women, and twenty-three children originally settled in Louisbourg.

=== Population ===
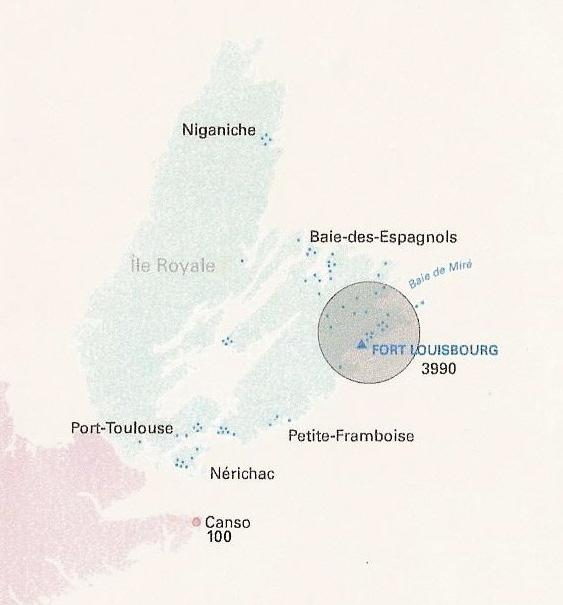
Population of Louisbourg in 1750, with other settlements on Cape Breton Island also pictured.

The population of Louisbourg quickly grew. In 1719, 823 people called this maritime city their home. Seven years later, in 1726, the population was 1,296, in 1734 it was 1,616, and by 1752, the population of Louisbourg was 4,174. Of course, population growth did not come without consequences. Smallpox ravaged the population in 1731 and 1732, but Louisbourg continued to grow, especially economically.

Year	Inhabitants
1719	823
1726	1,296
1734	1,616
1737	2,023
1740	2,500
1745	3,000
1750	3,990
1752	4,174

=== Economy ===
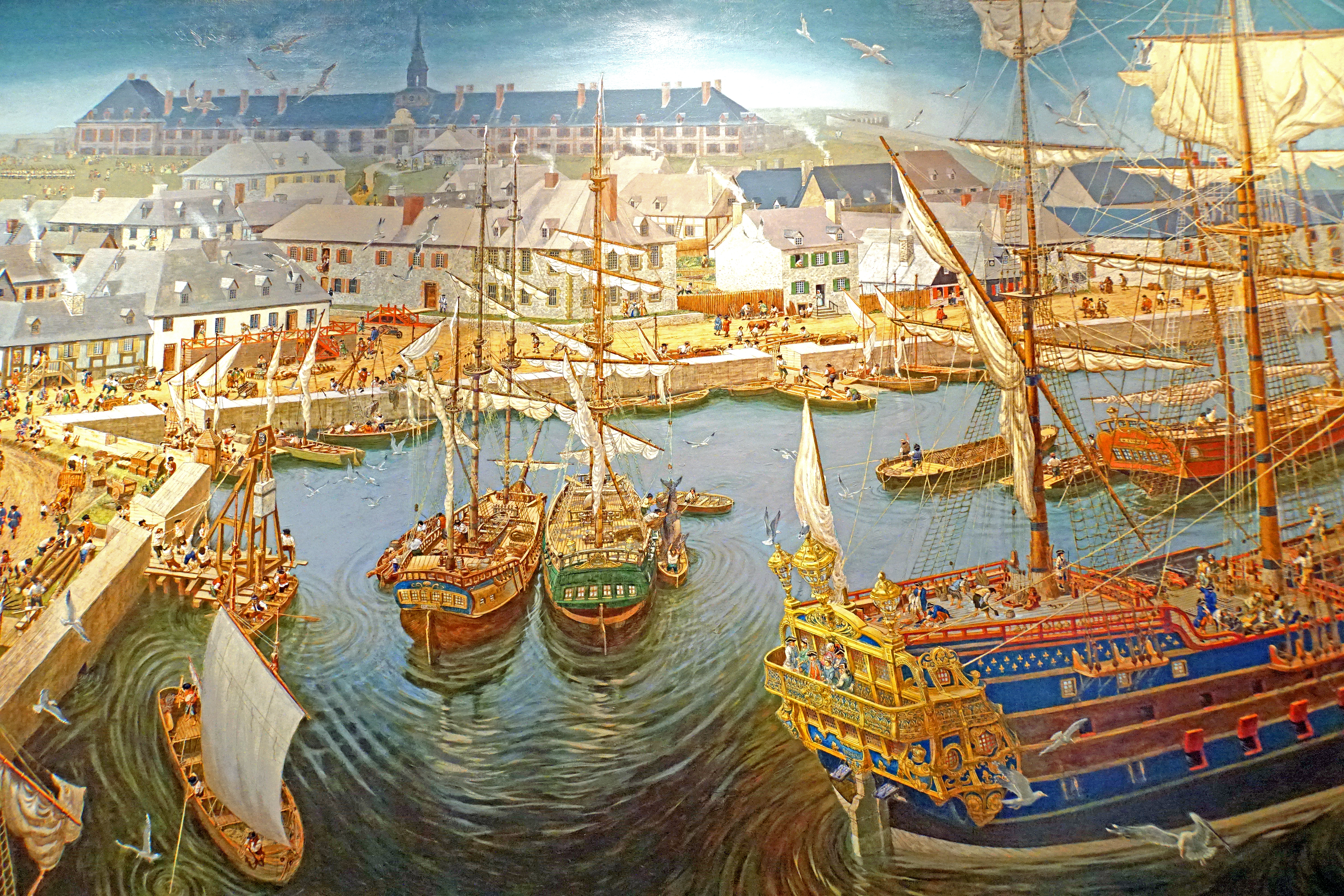
Depiction of the Port of Louisbourg prior to the fortress's dismantling by the British. At the time, the settlement was the third busiest port in North America.

Louisbourg was a large enough city to have a commercial district, a residential district, military arenas, marketplaces, inns, taverns and suburbs, as well as skilled labourers to fill all of these establishments. For the French, it was the second most important stronghold and commercial city in New France. Only Quebec was more important to France.

Unlike most other cities in New France, Louisbourg did not rely on agriculture or the seigneurial system. Louisbourg itself was a popular port and was the third busiest port in North America (after Boston and Philadelphia.) It was also popular for its exporting of fish, and other products made from fish, such as cod liver oil. The North Atlantic fishing trade employed over ten thousand people, and Louisbourg was seen as the ‘nursery for seamen.’ Louisbourg was an important investment for the French government because it gave them a strong commercial and military foothold in the Grand Banks. For France, the fishing industry was more lucrative than the fur trade. In 1731, Louisbourg fishermen exported 167,000 quintals of cod and 1600 barrels of cod-liver oil. There were roughly 400 shallop-fishing vessels out each day vying for the majority of the days catch. Also, 60 to 70 ocean-going schooners would head out from Louisbourg to catch fish further down the coast. Louisbourg's commercial success was able to bring ships from Europe, The West Indies, Quebec, Acadia, and New England.

=== Fortifications ===
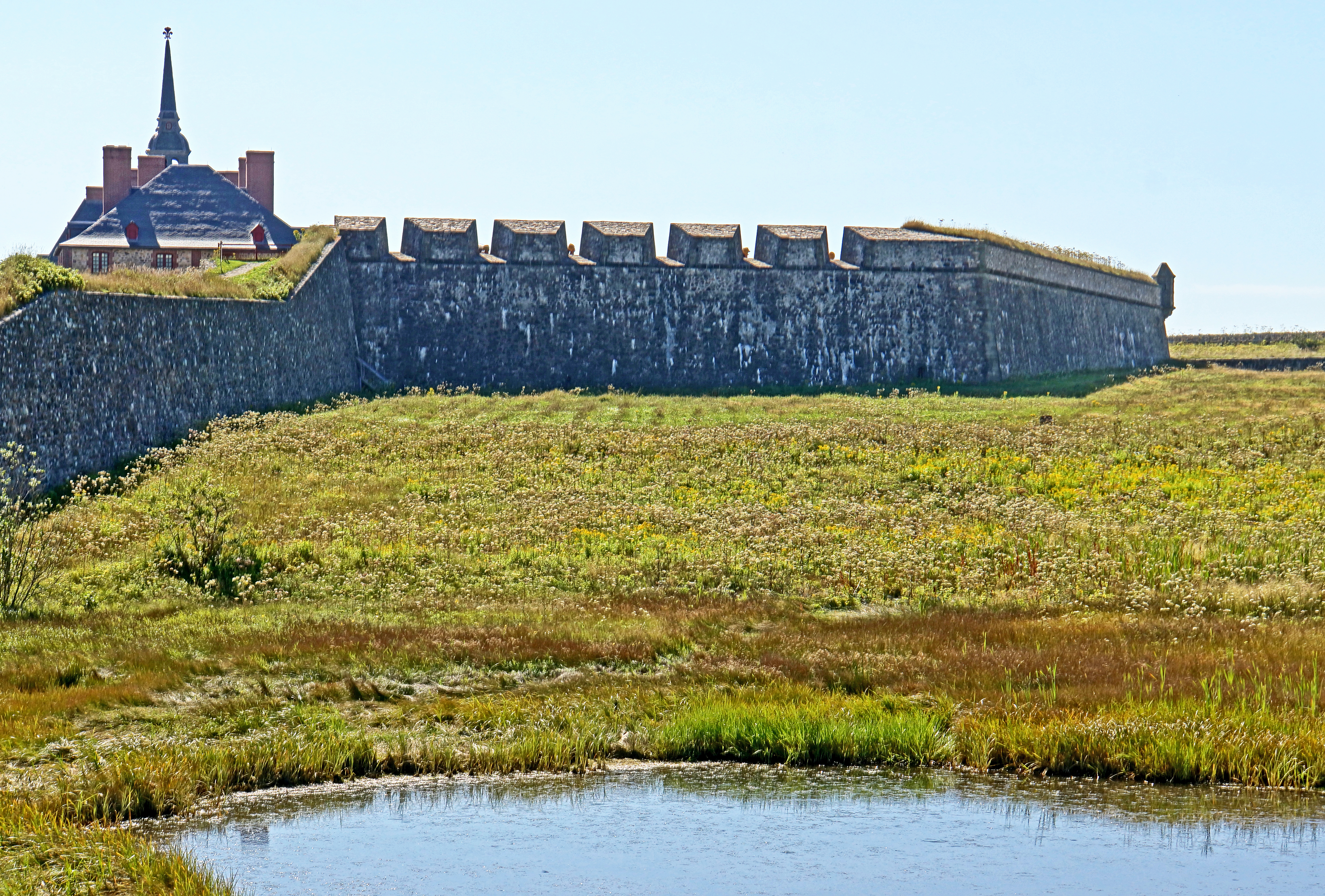
The fortifications that surrounded the settlement of Louisbourg originally took 28 years to build.

Louisbourg was also known for its fortifications, which took the original French builders 28 years to complete. The first engineer behind the project was Jean-Francois du Vergery de Verville. Verville picked Louisbourg as his location because of its natural barriers. The engineering work was continued by Etienne Verrier and finally, by Louis Franquet; the latter was the "highest ranking engineering officer in North America".

The fort itself cost France 30 million French livres, which prompted King Louis XV to joke that he should be able to see the peaks of the buildings from his Palace in Versaille. The original budget for the fort was four million livres. Two and a half miles of wall surrounded the entire fort. On the western side of the fort, the walls were 30 feet (9.1 m) high, and 36 feet (11 m) across, protected by a wide ditch and ramparts.

The site had four gates that led into the city. The Dauphin Gate, which is currently reconstructed, was the busiest, leading to the extensive fishing compounds around the harbour and to the main road leading inland. The Frederick Gate, also reconstructed, was the waterfront entrance. The Maurepas Gate, facing the narrows, connected the fishing establishments, dwellings and cemeteries on Rocheford Point and was elaborately decorated as it was very visible to arriving ships. The Queen's Gate on the sparsely populated seaward side saw little use. Louisbourg was also home to six bastions, two of which have been reconstructed: the Dauphin bastion, commonly referred to as a 'demi-bastion' because of its modification; the King's bastion; the Queen's bastion; the Princess bastion; the Maurepas bastion; and the Brouillon bastion. On the eastern side of the fort, 15 guns pointed out to the harbour. The wall on this side was only 16 feet (4.9 m) high and 6 feet (1.8 m) across.

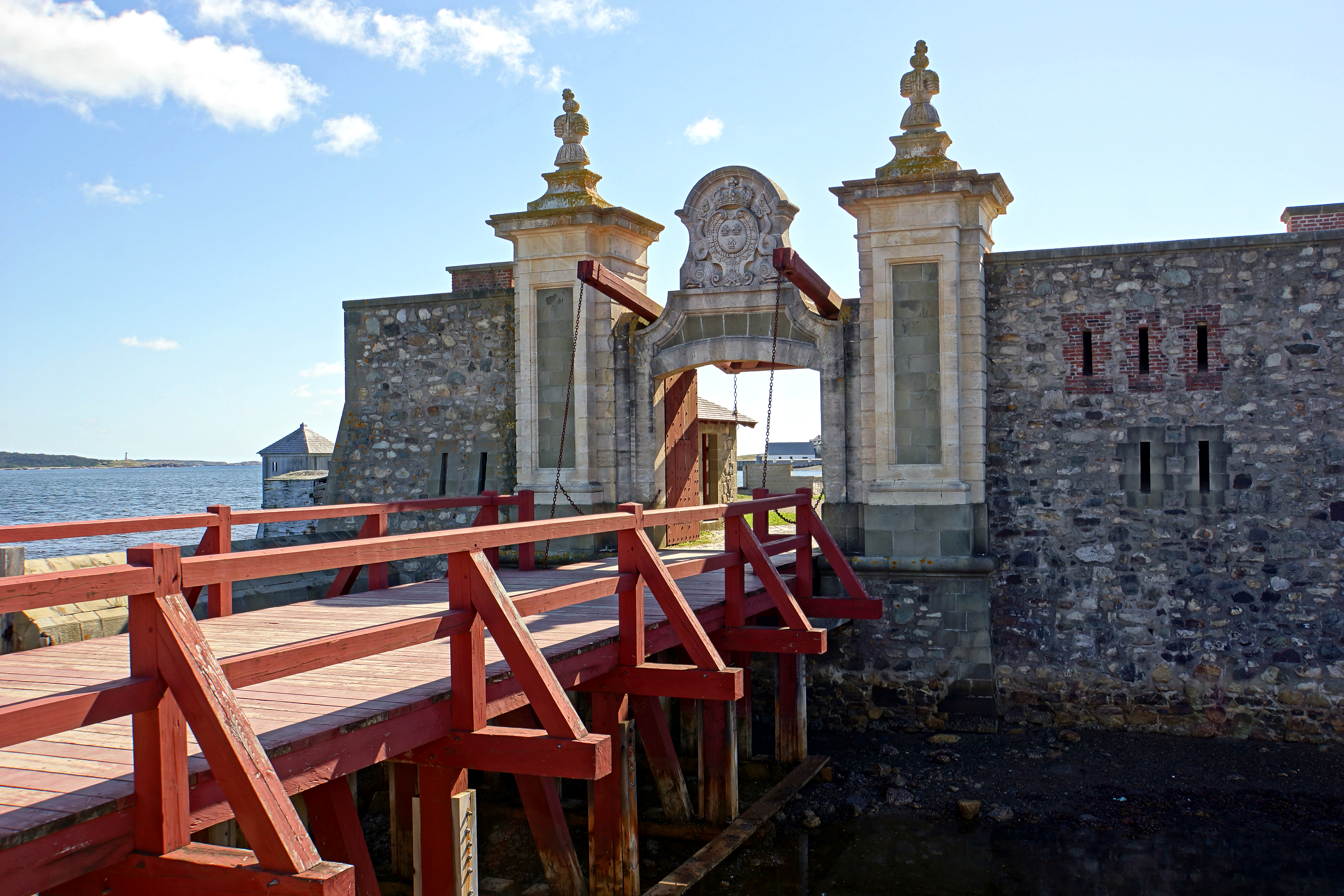
Dauphin Gate is one of four gateways into the fortified town.

Louisbourg was one of the "largest military garrisons in all of New France", and many battles were fought and lives lost here because of it. The fort had the embrasures to mount 148 guns; however, historians have estimated that only 100 embrasures had cannons mounted. Disconnected from the main fort, yet still a part of Louisbourg, a small island in the harbour entrance was also fortified. The walls on the Island Battery were 10 feet (3.0 m) high, and 8 feet (2.4 m) thick. Thirty-one 24-pound guns were mounted facing the harbour. The island itself was small, with room for only a few small ships to dock there. An even larger fortified battery, the Royal Battery, was located across the harbour from the town and mounted 40 guns to protect the harbour entrance.

=== Important structures ===
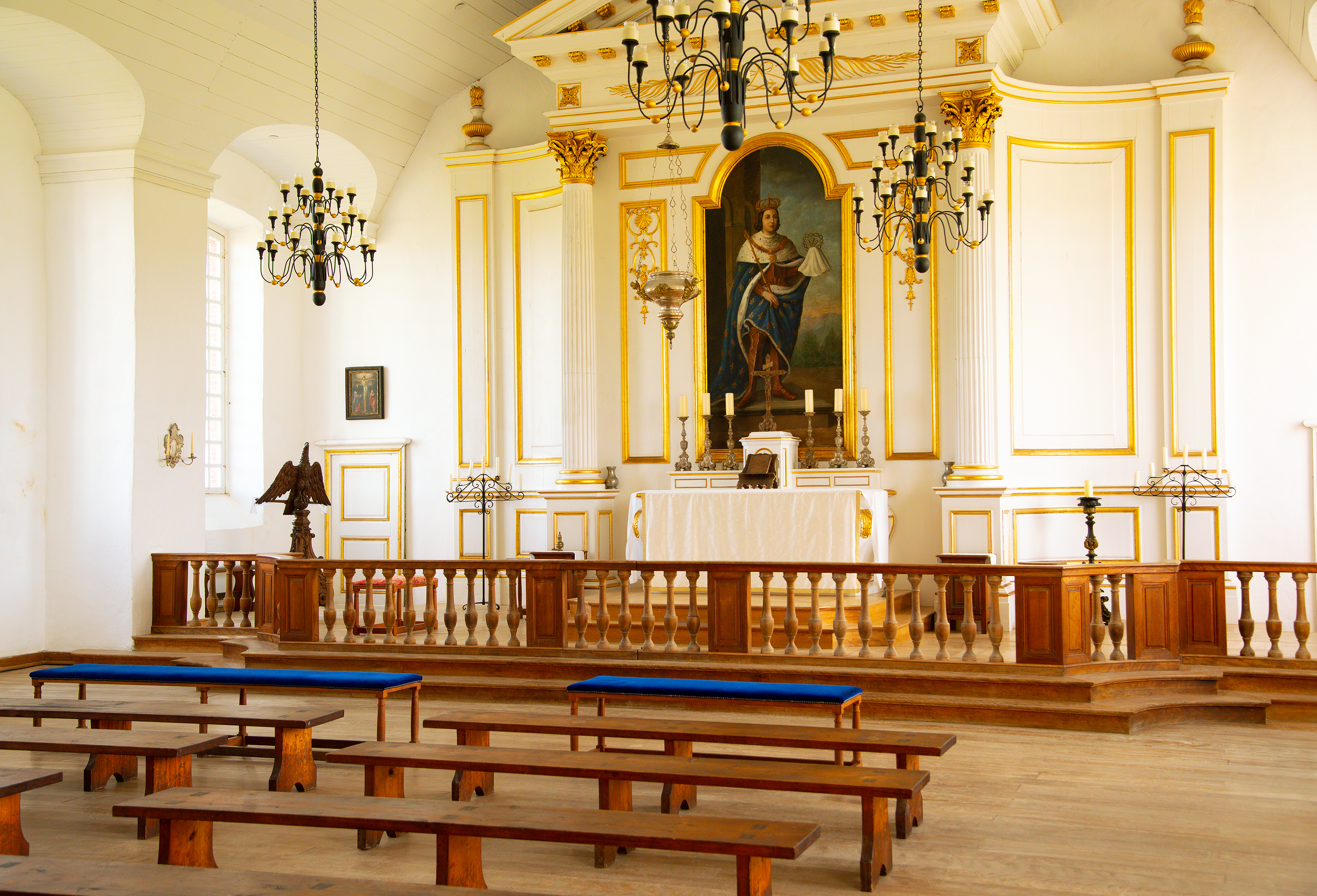
The Military Chapel

During the 1700s, Louisbourg boasted the finest hospital in North America and the second-largest building in the fort town. The hospital had a tall spire that would rival that of the King's bastion and was run by the Brothers of Saint-Jean-de-Dieu. By 1744, the hospital was well equipped for surgery and other medical care by the staff of six Brothers who had access to 40 medicines. It contained 100 beds and buildings that housed a "bakery, kitchen, laundry, well and stables, plus housing for black slaves".

Although most of the population was Roman Catholic during French control of the site, the Church was not powerful or wealthy. The Military Chapel was staffed by Recollets (missionaries) and everyone was welcome to attend the services. This structure is among those that have been fully restored.

=== Demolition ===
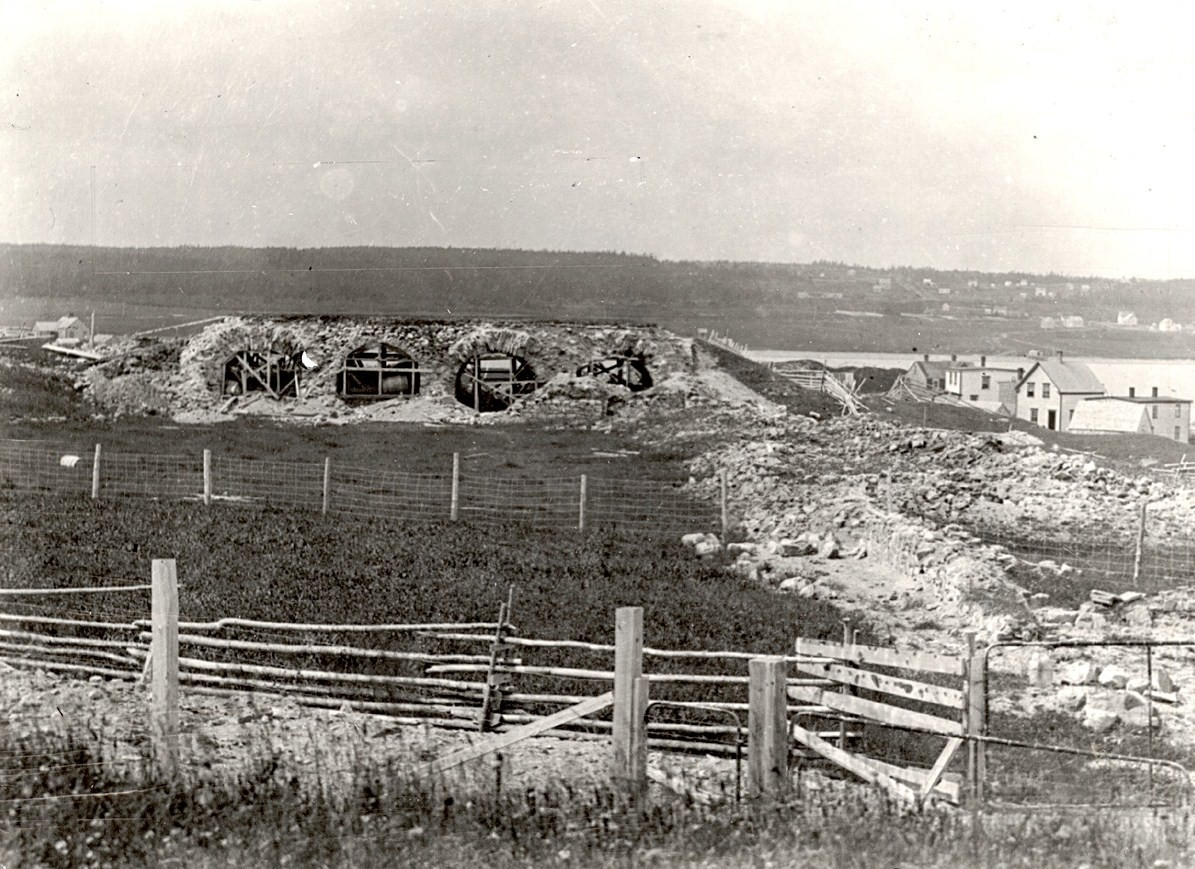
These four arches were all that remained of the fortified town by the time the site was designated a historic site in 1920. This photograph also shows a number of homes which were built on the site in modern times. They were eventually expropriated.

The French soldiers and inhabitants were expelled back to France after the British capture in 1758. The fortifications and town at Louisbourg were systematically destroyed by British engineers beginning in 1760 to prevent the town and port from being used in the future by the French, should the peace process return Cape Breton island to France, or by anyone else. Demolition by British engineers took six years. The British kept a garrison at Louisbourg until 1768. Some of the cut-stones from Louisbourg were shipped to Halifax to be re-used and, in the 1780s, to Sydney, Nova Scotia. During the reconstruction of Fortress Louisbourg, more than one million artifacts were uncovered by archaeologists.

== Climate ==
Louisbourg experiences a marine influenced humid continental climate (Köppen climate classification Dfb). Looking at weather data from Louisbourg, NS, we can see the follow average high and low temperatures for the 2020/2021 winter:

- December 2020- (Avg High:5.7/Avg Low: −0.9)--->Daily Avg: 2.4
- January 2020- (Avg High:2.0/Avg Low: −4.2)--->Daily Avg: −1.1
- February 2020- (Avg High:1.1/Avg Low: −6.4)--->Daily Avg: −2.65

The above suggests that if climate data for 2021-2050 would match these averages or exceed them, areas like Louisbourg, NS could be considered to have an oceanic climate rather than a continental climate since it would meet the Köppen climate classification using the −3 isotherm. This would make sense given that most of the Atlantic Coast of Nova Scotia is predicted to transition to a humid subtropical climate (Cfa) for 2071-2100 climate normals.

Climate data for Fortress of Louisbourg, 1981–2010 normals, extremes 1972–present
Month	Jan	Feb	Mar	Apr	May	Jun	Jul	Aug	Sep	Oct	Nov	Dec	Year
Record high °C (°F)	14.0 (57.2)	13.0 (55.4)	26.0 (78.8)	19.0 (66.2)	29.0 (84.2)	31.7 (89.1)	31.0 (87.8)	32.0 (89.6)	31.5 (88.7)	25.0 (77.0)	20.0 (68.0)	13.5 (56.3)	32.0 (89.6)
Mean daily maximum °C (°F)	−1 (30)	−1.1 (30.0)	1.4 (34.5)	5.6 (42.1)	11.0 (51.8)	16.4 (61.5)	20.3 (68.5)	21.4 (70.5)	18.3 (64.9)	12.5 (54.5)	7.0 (44.6)	2.3 (36.1)	9.5 (49.1)
Daily mean °C (°F)	−4.9 (23.2)	−5.2 (22.6)	−2.2 (28.0)	2.2 (36.0)	6.9 (44.4)	11.9 (53.4)	16.2 (61.2)	17.6 (63.7)	14.3 (57.7)	8.9 (48.0)	3.8 (38.8)	−1.1 (30.0)	5.7 (42.3)
Mean daily minimum °C (°F)	−8.9 (16.0)	−9.3 (15.3)	−5.9 (21.4)	−1.3 (29.7)	2.7 (36.9)	7.4 (45.3)	12.2 (54.0)	13.8 (56.8)	10.3 (50.5)	5.2 (41.4)	0.6 (33.1)	−4.5 (23.9)	1.9 (35.4)
Record low °C (°F)	−26 (−15)	−25 (−13)	−23 (−9)	−13.5 (7.7)	−7 (19)	−1.5 (29.3)	4.0 (39.2)	3.5 (38.3)	−1.7 (28.9)	−4.5 (23.9)	−12 (10)	−20.6 (−5.1)	−26 (−15)
Average precipitation mm (inches)	147.0 (5.79)	138.0 (5.43)	143.6 (5.65)	147.5 (5.81)	127.6 (5.02)	113.1 (4.45)	108.4 (4.27)	107.8 (4.24)	133.0 (5.24)	158.3 (6.23)	168.9 (6.65)	153.1 (6.03)	1,646.3 (64.81)
Average rainfall mm (inches)	83.4 (3.28)	77.9 (3.07)	100.1 (3.94)	127.9 (5.04)	126.9 (5.00)	113.1 (4.45)	108.4 (4.27)	107.8 (4.24)	133.0 (5.24)	158.3 (6.23)	160.7 (6.33)	106.3 (4.19)	1,403.6 (55.26)
Average snowfall cm (inches)	58.5 (23.0)	56.6 (22.3)	41.2 (16.2)	17.9 (7.0)	0.8 (0.3)	0.0 (0.0)	0.0 (0.0)	0.0 (0.0)	0.0 (0.0)	0.0 (0.0)	8.2 (3.2)	44.6 (17.6)	227.8 (89.7)
Average precipitation days (≥ 0.2 mm)	15.4	13.3	13.7	15.3	15.2	14.0	13.9	14.3	15.2	16.8	18.9	17.8	183.8
Average rainy days (≥ 0.2 mm)	8.3	7.2	9.6	13.6	15.1	14.0	13.9	14.3	15.2	16.8	17.5	11.9	157.3
Average snowy days (≥ 0.2 cm)	9.3	8.0	6.3	3.1	0.24	0.0	0.0	0.0	0.0	0.0	2.2	8.0	37.1
Mean monthly sunshine hours	89.9	109.0	138.4	150.7	170.7	185.5	184.7	182.1	159.8	130.9	74.9	74.2	1,650.7
Percentage possible sunshine	31.9	37.3	37.5	37.2	36.9	39.5	38.8	41.6	42.4	38.6	26.2	27.4	36.3
Source: Environment Canada

== See also ==
- Karrer Regiment
- List of French forts in North America
- Louisbourg Garrison
- Royal eponyms in Canada
