= Karrer Regiment =

Régiment suisse de Karrer 1719-1752 de Hallwyl 1752-1763
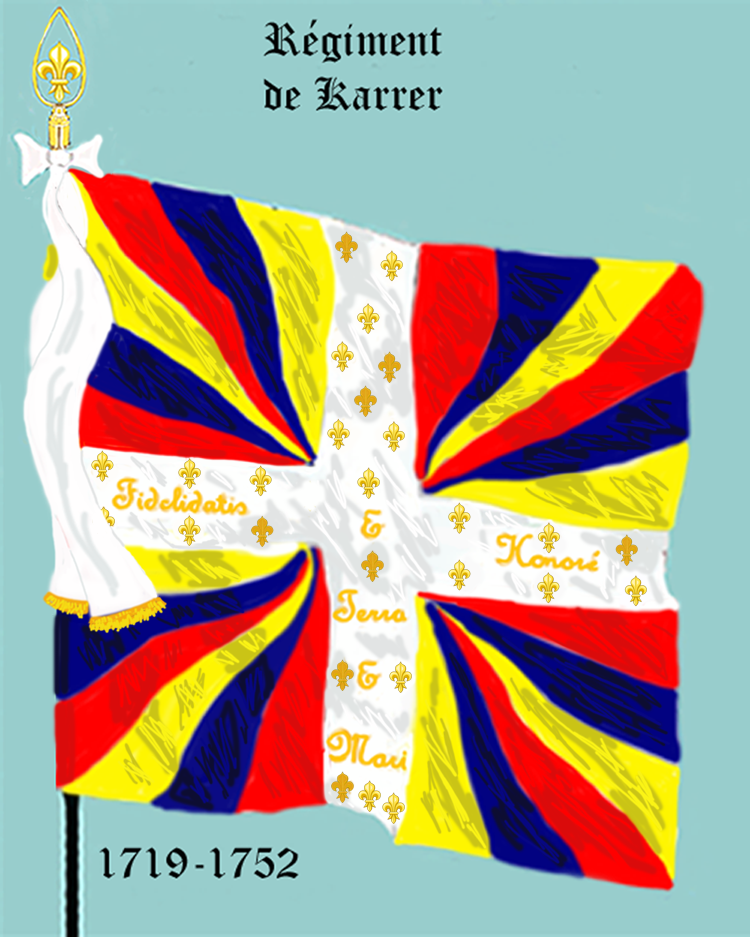
- Company colour of Régiment de Karrer
- Active: 1719-1763
- Country: Old Swiss Confederacy
- Allegiance: Kingdom of France
- Branch: Marines
- Type: Colonial infantry
- Role: Garrison infantry
- Size: Five companies
- Part of: Royal French Navy
- Depot and garrisons: Rochefort, Martinique, Saint-Domingue, Louisbourg, Québec, Louisiana
- Mottos: Fidelitati & honore, Terra & Mare
- Engagements: War of the Austrian Succession; Seven Years' War

Commanders
- Notable commanders: Franz Adam Karrer 1719; Ludwig Ignaz Karrer 1736; Franz Josef von Hallwyl 1752

Insignia
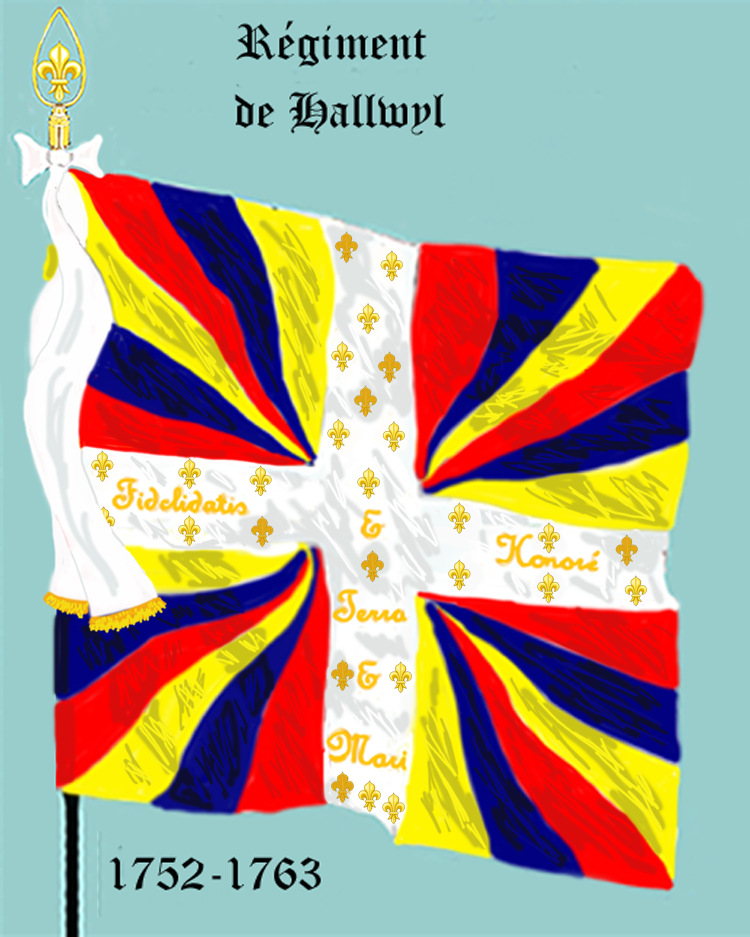
- Company colour of Régiment de Hallwyl

The Régiment de Karrer (Karrer's Regiment/Karrer Regiment) was a Swiss foreign regiment in French colonial service 1719–1763.

== Overview ==
The regiment de Karrer was raised in 1719 by Franz Adam Karrer, a Swiss officer in French service, for the French army. Two years later it was transferred to the French Navy for service in the colonies. Ludwig Ignaz Karrer succeeded his father as colonel-proprietor in 1736. At his death in 1752, Franz Josef von Hallwyl became the last colonel-proprietor. The officers of the regiment were Swiss; the men were recruited in Switzerland and Germany.

== Organization ==
Originally the regiment contained three companies: the colonel's company constituted the depot in Rochefort; the second company was stationed on Martinique; the third company on Saint-Domingue. Detachment from the colonel's company was sent to the Louisbourg fortress in Acadia; 50 men in 1722, 100 men in 1724; 150 men from 1741 until the fortress' surrender in 1745. Soldiers from de Karrer was at the heart of the mutiny at Louisbourg in 1744. A small detachment of 30 men served at Québec 1747–1749. A fourth company was raised in 1731, and became stationed in Louisiana until 1764. A fifth company was raised in 1752 and sent to Saint-Domingue. The regiment was disbanded in 1763.

=== Authorized strength ===
When the regiment was created in 1719, it was to contain three companies of 250 men each, officers included. Each company would have one captain-lieutenant, two lieutenants, one sub-lieutenant and eight sergeants.

According to the Ordinance of 1731, for the maintenance of the Swiss regiment of Karrer, the regiment had the following authorized strength:

- Colonel's Company to contain Sieur Karrer as colonel, one major, one chaplain, two captain-lieutenants, two lieutenants, two sub-lieutenants, two ensigns, twelve sergeants, 18 corporals, four Trabanten (bodyguards), one drum-major, six drummers, two fifers; the whole company containing 200 men including the officers. The colonel and the major to be of the Catholic faith.
- The Second and the Third Companies each to contain, two captain-lieutenants, two lieutenants, two sub-lieutenants, two ensigns, eight sergeants, twelve corporals, four Trabanten, four drummers; each company containing 200 men including the officers.
- The Fourth Company to contain, one captain-lieutenant, two lieutenants, one sub-lieutenant, one ensign, eight sergeants, twelve corporals, four Trabanten, four drummers; the whole company containing 200 men including the officers.

When Franz Josef von Hallwyl became colonel-proprietor in 1752, an ordinance was issued elucidating the organization of the regiment. The regiment to contain five companies; each company to contain 200 men, officers included. The colonel's company stationed as garrison in Rochefort, two companies in Saint-Domingue, one on Martinique and one in Louisiana.

== Soldiers ==
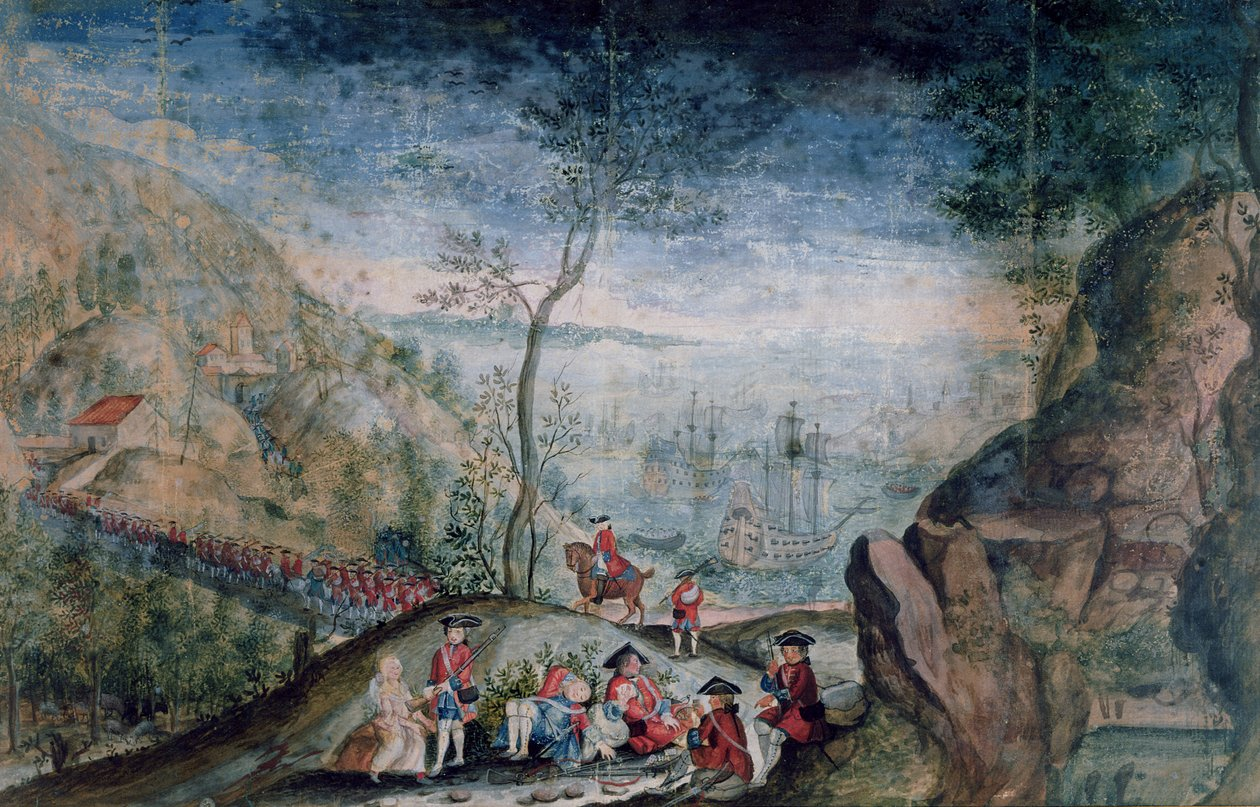
Karrer Regiment disembarking at Louisbourg.

The soldiers of the Karrer Regiment were to be recruited from the same manpower source as other Swiss regiments in French service, that is from Swiss, Austrians, Bavarians and Danes. Those selected for service at Louisbourg were chosen with particular regard to their physical strength and their technical skill in the building trades, and were enlisted for six-year-periods. They made important contributions to the building of the fortress. Enlistment records show that the soldiers of the regiment came not only from Switzerland, but also from Germany, Denmark, Lorraine and Montbéliard. The bulk of them came from an impoverished background. In spite of this, the military records show that the Karrer soldiers physical health was better than the French soldiers at Louisbourg, as they were in less need of hospital care and when subject to hospital treatment were released earlier.

=== Number of men serving at Louisbourg and Quebec ===
Louisbourg
Year	Other ranks	Officers
1722	49	1
1724	98	2
1741-45	147	3
Quebec
Year	Other ranks	Officers
1747-49	29	1
Source:	.	

== Legal status and privileges ==
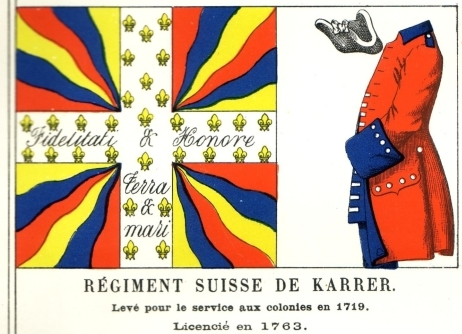
Color and uniform of the Regiment de Karrer.

The officers and men of the regiment did not owe personal allegiance to the King of France; only to the colonel-proprietor, who also signed the officers' commissions. The colonel-proprietor had entered a capitulation with the King, through the secretary of state for the navy, in which he put the regiment, its officers and men, into French service. It was the colonel-proprietor that had promised collective fidelity for himself and his regiment to the King. The capitulation was a legal contract, renewable every ten years, where the terms of both parties were carefully stipulated. As a foreign regiment, the regiment enjoyed a number of privileges. Liberty of conscience was guaranteed, which meant that Protestants could be recruited; Protestant officers and men were not obliged to participate in Catholic ceremonies. The regiment had its own legal jurisdiction, and its members could only be tried by its own court-martial, even when being accused of crimes against civilians. The privileges of the regiment often triggered conflicts with local military and civilian authorities. The mutiny of 1744 was an expression of the foreign soldiers will to defend their special status from infringements.

== Uniforms ==
The regiment wore red coats with blue lapels with white buttonholes, blue cuffs, lining, waistcoats, breeches, and hose (white from 1739), and white buttons. The drummers wore the colonel-proprietors' livery, not the king's, and the drums were decorated with the colonel's coat of arms.

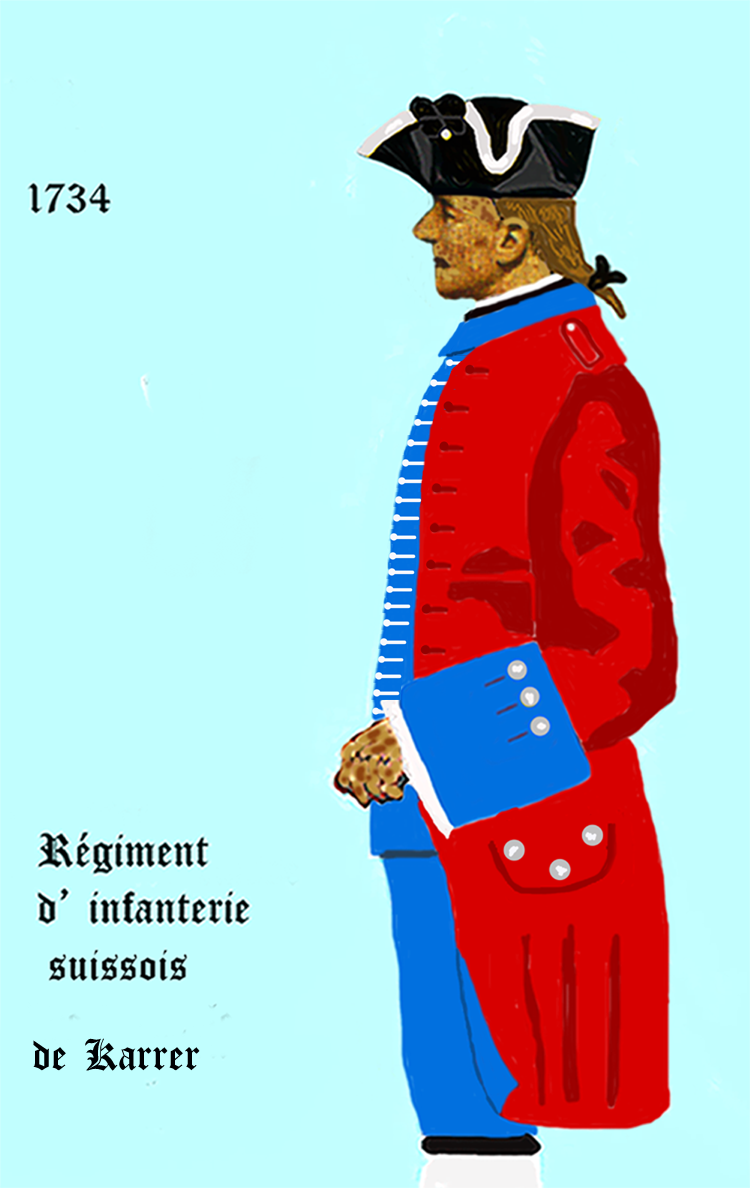
Regimentals 1734.

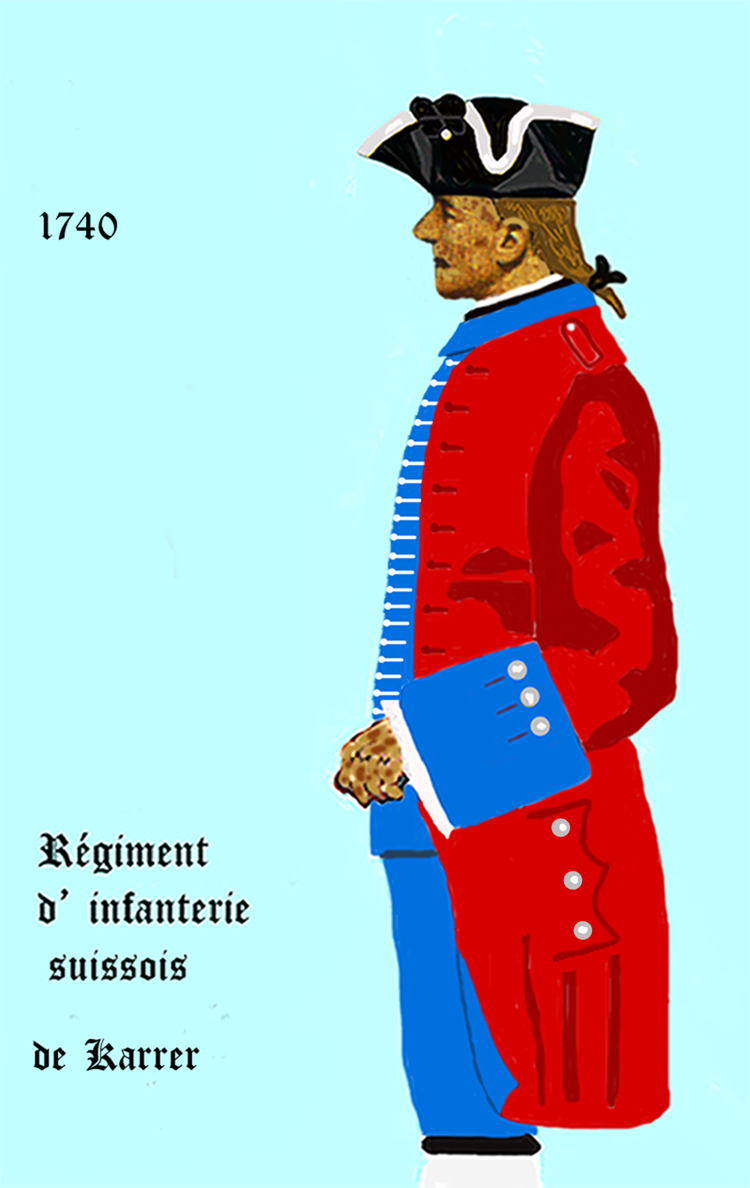
Regimentals 1740.

== See also ==
- List of Royal French foreign regiments
