= Charles Guillaume Vial d'Alais =

French colonial administrator (1749-1819)

Governor General of Guiana
- In office October 1788 – June 1789
- Preceded by: Pierre François de Mareuilh de Villeboi
- Succeeded by: Jacques Martin de Bourgon

Governor General of Guiana
- In office 23 September 1792 – 1793
- Preceded by: Henri Benoist
- Succeeded by: Henri Benoist

Personal details
- Born: 12 February 1749 Paray-le-Monial, Burgundy, Kingdom of France
- Died: 18 February 1819 (aged 70) Paray-le-Monial, Burgundy, Kingdom of France

Charles Guillaume Vial d'Alais (12 February 1749 – 19 February 1819) was a French military officer and Governor-general of Guiana.

== Biography ==
Charles Guillaume Vial d'Alais was born on 12 February 1749 in Paray-le-Monial, Burgundy, Kingdom of France to a Protestant and irenic family.

Vial d'Alais entered military service in 1766. He joined the mousquetaires on 17 May 1768. On 29 May 1778, he was named captain of the Infantry Regiment of Picardy, then captain-commander of the first company of foreign volunteers of the navy on November 1. On 1 April 1780, he was named captain-commander of the 1st Volunteer Company of Lauzun.

He joined the Order of Saint-Louis as a knight around 1781. Under Armand de Kersaint, d'Alais participated in the conquest of Dutch Guiana, Demerara and Essequibo. He distinguished himself during this campaign, and on 16 May 1782, he became deputy commander of Démérary with the rank of major.

On 6 July 1784, he was named major of the Île Bourbon. On 5 June 1785, he became major of Cayenne's battalion.

=== First term and subsequent military service ===
Vial d'Alais was interim Governor General of Guiana from October 1788 to June 1789.

To avoid abuse, Vial d'Alais enforced work contracts between colonists and Native Americans.

He was promoted colonel on 4 March 1791. He became colonel in the Regiment of Monsieur on 7 March 1792 then maréchal-de-camp on 13 May 1792.

=== Second term and later life ===
In July 1792, the Legislative Assembly confirmed the annulation of the expulsions by the Colonial Assembly of Guiana, that the law of 4 April 1792 instituting the equality of men was to be enforced and that the Colonial assembly had to be reorganized, and thus reelected. To apply these decisions, the Ministère de la Marine named d'Alais Governor General of Guiana.

Vial d'Alais and the new Civil Commissioneer, Guillot, arrived in Cayenne on 23 September 1792. Unbeknownst to Guillot and d'Alais, the Republic had taken power in France by their arrival.

Guillot and d'Alais's relationship strained after disagreements on the matter of the returned expulsed, and d'Alais increasingly sided with the Colonial Assembly leaders. After the election, d'Alais ratified the Colonial Assembly's local constitution against Guillot's wishes.

Vial d'Alais ordered refractory priests to take the oath of loyalty to France and the Civil Constitution of the Clergy under threat of deportation.

He was recalled to France alongside Guillot in 1793.

Vial d'Alais's ship was shipwrecked, and he was taken prisoner by the English. He returned to France on parole on 4 October 1794. He retired on 7 February 1799. He died in Paray-le-Monial on 18 February 1819.

== Legacy ==
Vial d'Alais was an early French supporter of slavery's abolition. He opposed slavery on moral grounds, but also believed slavery to be economically inefficient due to slaves' work-to-rule. The Human Rights League of Paray-le-Monial gave an exposition on Vial d'Alais in May 2023 and apposed a commemorative plaque at his Paray-le-Monial home on 30 May 2025
