= Insurrection of 27 January 1796 =

Date	27 January 1796 (7 pluviôse of Year IV)
Location	French Guiana
Result	French Republic victory

Belligerents
Rebels	(French First Republic) French Republic

Commanders and leaders
Hector Ménénius (executed); Dubart (executed); Adome †	François-Maurice de Cointet de Fillain

Casualties and losses
1 killed 15 captured and executed 4 deported	4-5 wounded

The insurrection of 27 January 1796 was an insurrection in revolutionary French Guiana.

== Events ==
=== Background ===
The insurrection was likely caused by the black population's discontent with lower salaries, delayed pay, lack of supplies, inflation, measures taken by Cointet to keep workers in their workshops under army surveillance and the possible return of slavery.

The insurrection was to begin on 29 January 1796. In Cayenne, fires would have been lighted to attract, divide and scare the crowd, and the rebels would then capture the city's fort and gunpowder magazine. A single cannon shot would have alerted other rebels of their success, and the insurrection would have spread to all cantons.

However, this plan was thwarted in advance thanks to government surveillance, likely by a secret police that Cointet may have funded with 25,000 livres.

=== Insurrection ===
The rebels attacked military posts near Cayenne, in two cantons. There were multiple home infractions; homeowners were tied by the rebels and threatened. Four or five republican soldiers were wounded. One rebel leader, Adome, was killed in action.

The rebels had three objectives. First, they wished to eliminate key figures of the republican regime: the governor general Cointet, the commandant, two political deportees from France (Collot d'Herbois and Billaud-Varenne) and military leaders that had republican sympathies or were responsible for agricultural operations. Second, they apparently wished to genocide the white population of French Guiana; but this is doubtful considering whites participated in the insurrection. Third, they wished to take power in Guiana and lead it to independence.

The insurrection was quickly crushed, but the armed forces stayed on alert for 24 days for unknown reasons.

=== Aftermath ===
Fifteen rebels were hanged, including Ménénius (Note: An educated ex-slave and colonial assembly member) and Dubart. (Note: A white armorer and colonial assembly member) Four others were sentenced to death in absentia. Four white colonial assembly members were deported for agitating the black population, and other whites were suspected of participating in the insurrection.

Collot d'Herbois and Billaud-Varenne were brought back to Cayenne for their own protection, implying the insurrection may have spread to more than two cantons.

The insurrection of 27 January 1796 was the only French Guianan insurrection that could be considered a national movement during the French Revolution.
