= French Marines =

French Marines may refer to any of the following:

== Historical ==
- Troupes de la marine, the corps maintained by the French Navy to protect its ships
  - Compagnies Franches de la Marine, the above which was renamed and retrained serve as amphibious troops and overseas garrisons
- Compagnie Ordinaire de la Mer, another corps maintained by the French Navy to protect its ships
- Régiment de La Marine, the above formed into a regiment which later became the French Army's 11th Infantry Regiment,
- The Troupes de la Marine were transferred to the French Army and renamed Troupes coloniales from 1900 - 1960

See also: French Marines in Canada, 1683-1715

== Current ==
- Troupes de marine, a corps of the current French Army
- Force maritime des fusiliers marins et commandos (FORFUSCO) has command and control over the following:
  - Fusiliers Marins, the current force in charge of providing protection for French naval vessels and facilities.
  - Commandos Marine, the Special Operation Forces (SOF) of the French Navy.
