= Vermandois Regiment =

Régiment de Vermandois
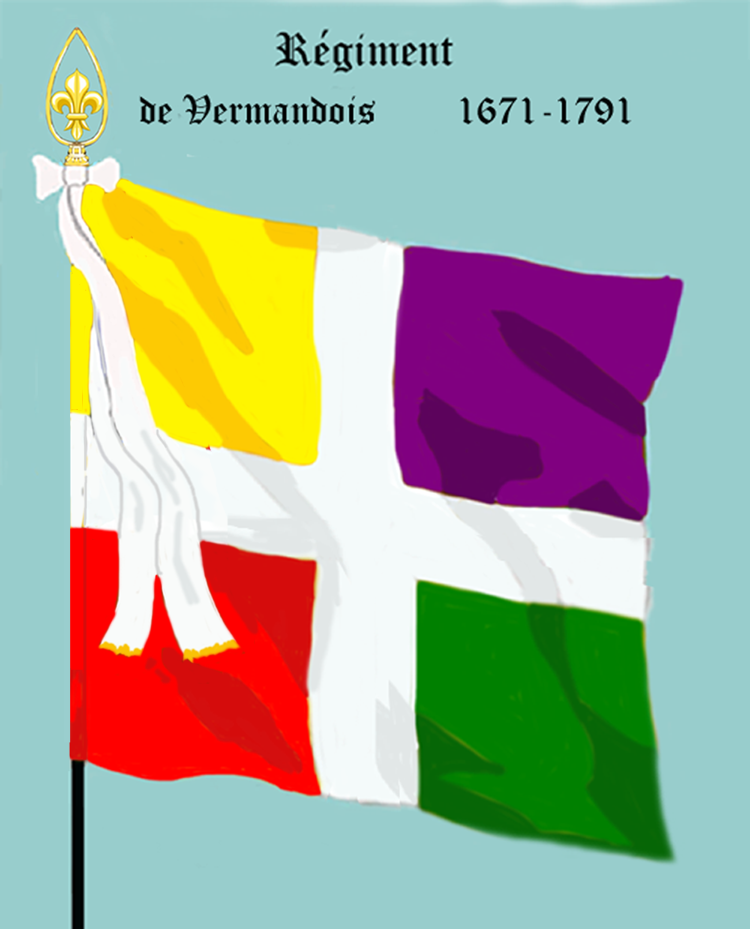
- Ordnance Colors of the Régiment de Vermandois
- Active: 1669–1795
- Country: France
- Allegiance: Kingdom of France
- Type: Regiment
- Role: Line Infantry

The Régiment de Vermandois was an infantry regiment of the Kingdom of France created in 1643.

== Lineage ==
- December 24, 1669 : creation of the Régiment de l’Amiral de France, attached to the Levant Fleet
- Following March 1671 : the regiment transferred to land service
- January 1, 1791 : designated as 61 Line Infantry Regiment
- October 10, 1794 : the 1st battalion was reformed by incorporation to the 121st Battle Demi-Brigade (French: 121^{e} demi-brigade de bataille) during the formation of the demi-brigade.
- June 19, 1795 : reformation, the 2nd battalion being incorporated to the 122nd Battle Demi-Brigade (French: 122^{e} demi-brigade de bataille) during the formation of the demi-brigade.

== Equipment ==
=== Regimental Colors ===
3 regimental colonels out of 1 "white" Colonel and 2 of Ordinance « yellow, red, green and violet by opposition, & white cross »

Drapeau d’Ordonnance

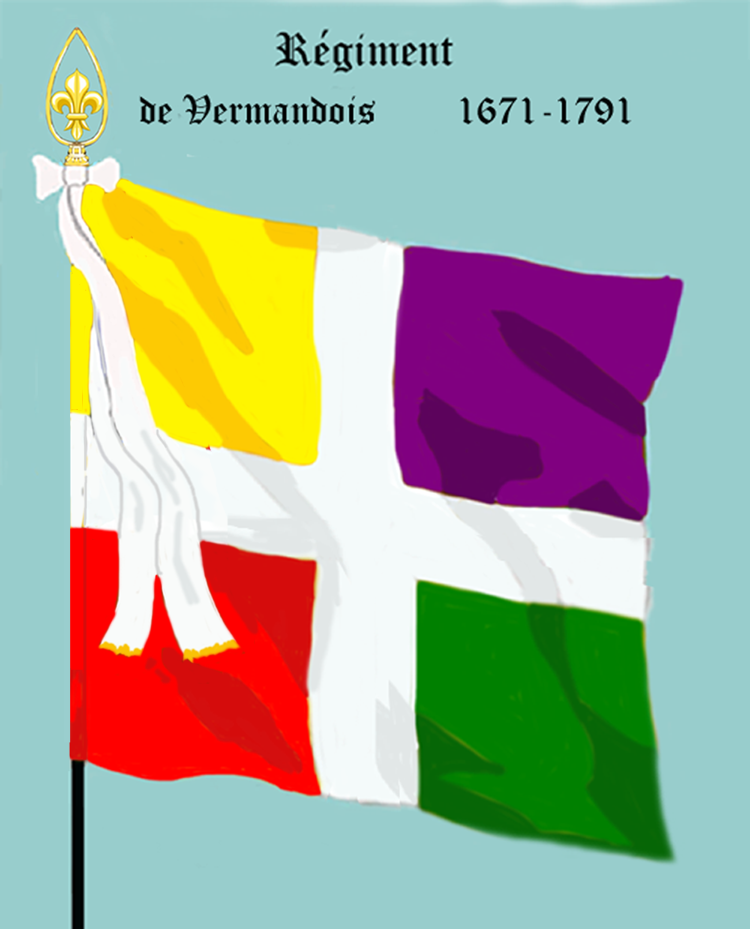
régiment de Vermandois de 1671 à 1791

=== Uniform ===
Uniformes

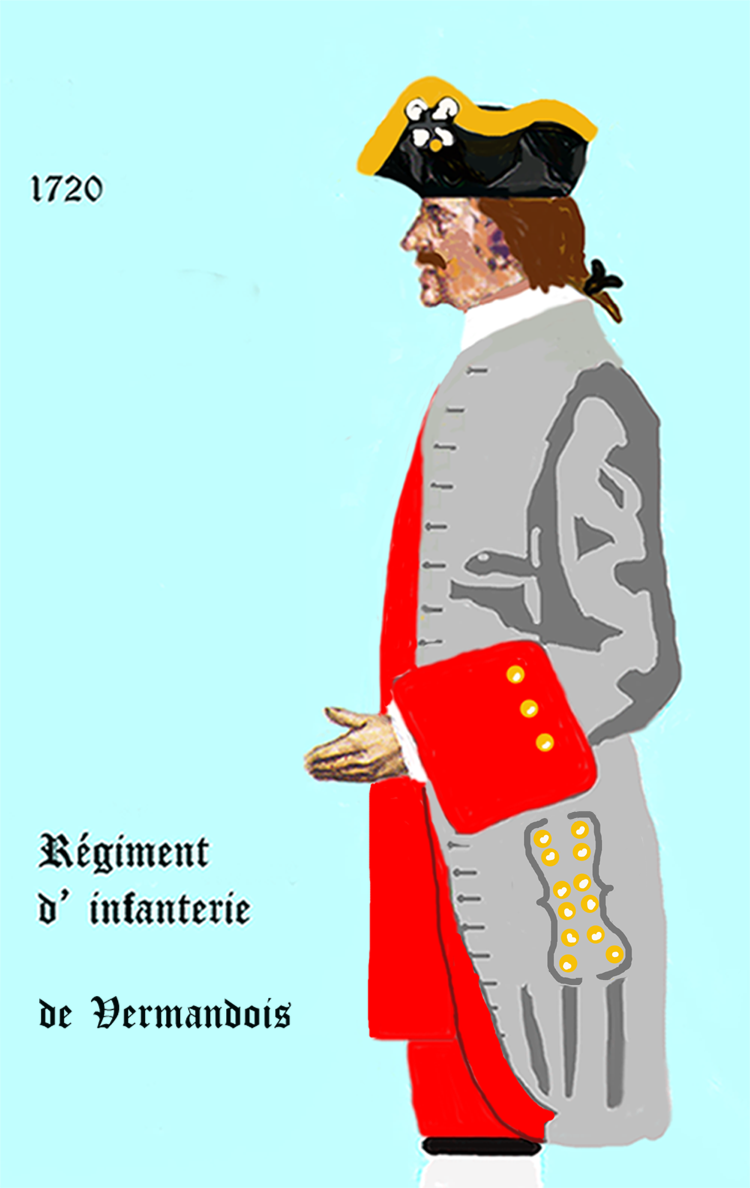
régiment de Vermandois de 1720 à 1734

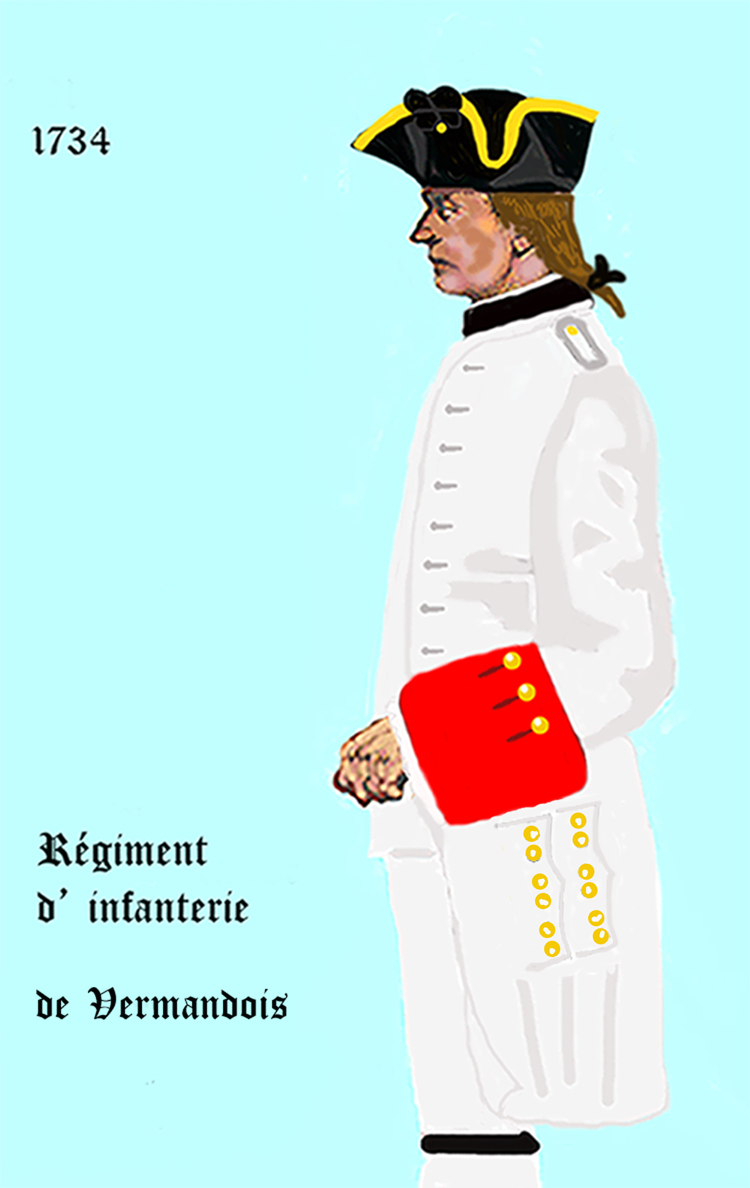
régiment de Vermandois de 1734 à 1762

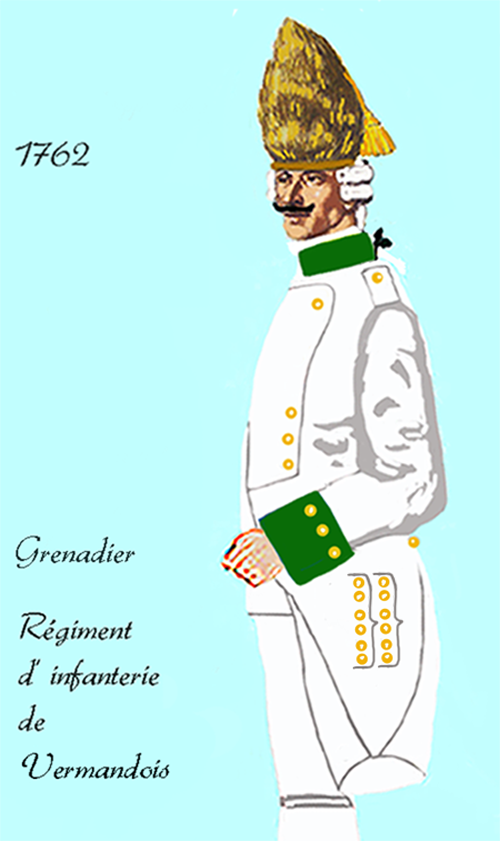
grenadier du régiment de Vermandois de 1762 à 1767

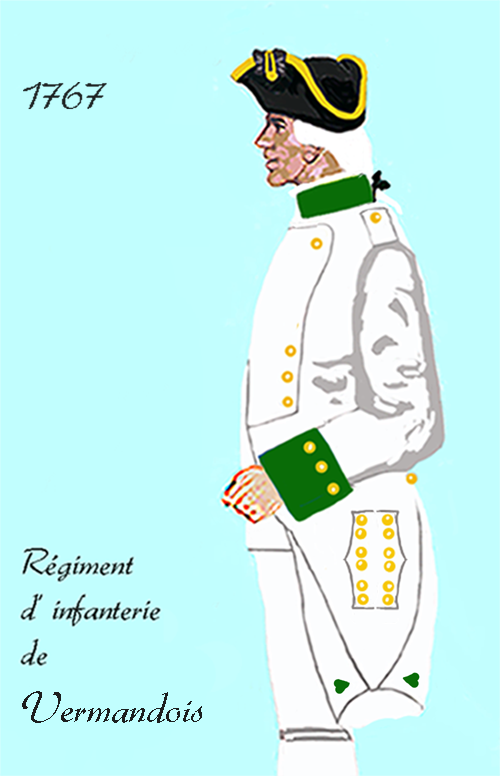
régiment de Vermandois de 1767 à 1776
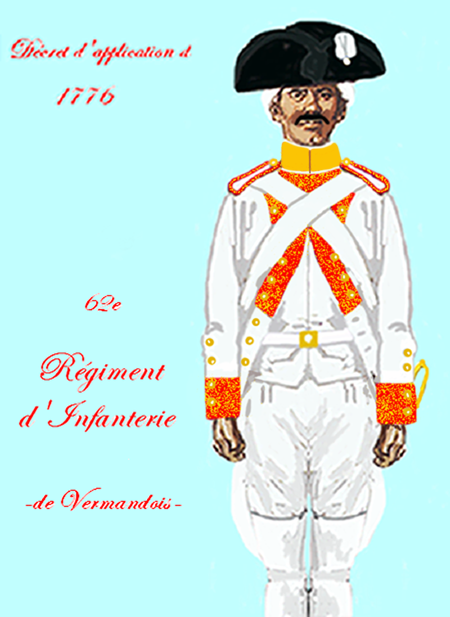
régiment de Vermandois de 1776 à 1779

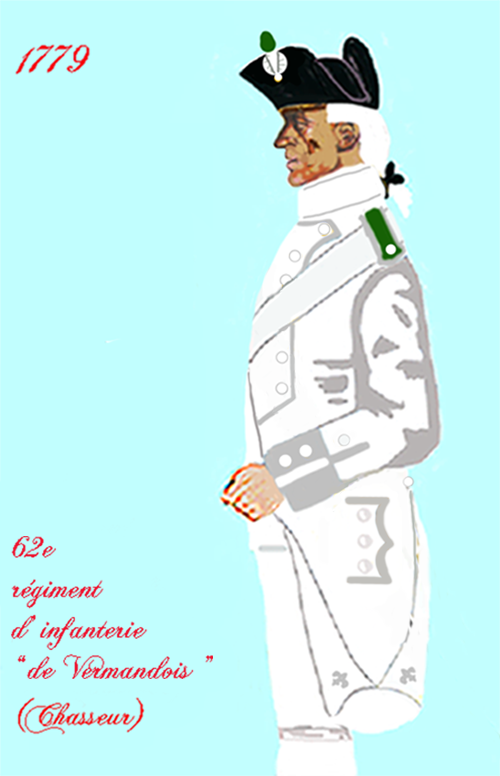
régiment de Vermandois de 1779 à 1791

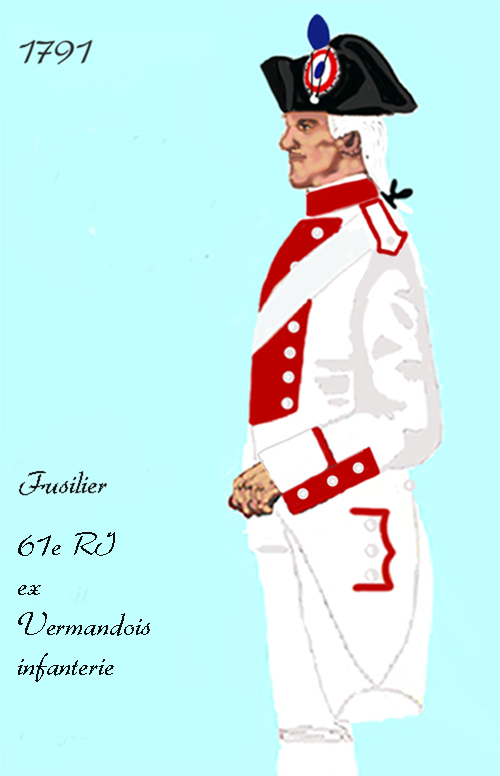
61st Line Infantry Regiment de 1791 à 1792

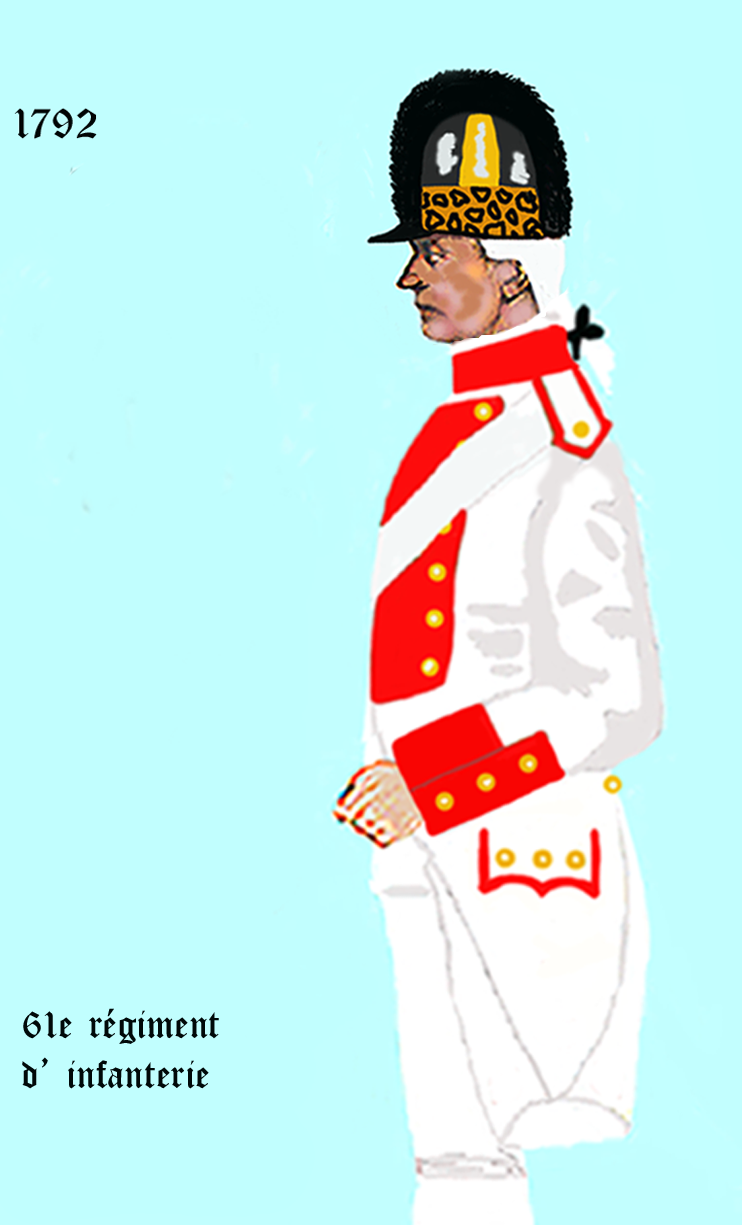
61st Line Infantry Regiment de 1792 à 1795

== History ==
=== Colonels & mestres de camp ===
- December 24, 1669 : Charles de Goyon-Matignon, comte de Gacé, brigadier on February 13, 1674, † October 1674
- November 1, 1674 : Charles Auguste de Goyon de Matignon (French: Charles Auguste de Goyon de Matignon), chevalier de Thorigny then comte de Gacé, brigadier on August 24, 1688, maréchal de camp on March 29, 1689, lieutenant général on March 30, 1693, maréchal de France on February 18, 1708, † December 6, 1729
- March 29, 1689 : N. de Seiglières-Belleforière, marquis de Soyecourt
- July 19, 1690 : Armand de Béthune, marquis de Charost, brigadier on March 30, 1693, maréchal de camp on January 3, 1696, lieutenant général on December 23, 1702, † October 23, 1747
- May 5, 1696 : Antoine de La Vove, marquis de Tourouvre, declared brigadier on November 1703 by an expedited brevet on April 2, † January 1, 1706
- January 1705 : N. de La Vove, chevalier de Tourouvre
- July 27, 1709 : François-Lazare Thomassin, marquis de Saint-Paul, brigadier on February 1, 1719, † August 10, 1734
- August 26, 1733 : Louis Antoine, comte de l’Esparre then de Gramont, brigadier on February 1, 1719, maréchal de camp on February 20, 1734, lieutenant general on March 1, 1738, † May 11, 1745
- March 10, 1734 : Louis Marie Bretagne Dominique de Rohan-Chabot (French: Louis-Marie-Bretagne de Rohan-Chabot), duc de Rohan, brigadier on February 20, 1743, † 1791
- April 16, 1738 : Armand Henri, marquis de Clermont-Gallerande
- February 21, 1740 : N. de Froulay, chevalier de Tessé
- April 16, 1743 : Pierre François, marquis de Rougé, declared brigadier in November 1745 by expedited brevet on May 1, déclaré maréchal de camp on December 1748 by brevet on May 10, lieutenant général on December 17, 1759, † July 17, 1761
- February 1, 1749 : César Jean-Baptiste de Valence-Combes, marquis de Thimbrune
- June 5, 1763 : Anne-Joseph-Hippolyte de Maurès de Malartic (French: Anne-Joseph-Hippolyte de Maurès de Malartic), comte de Malartic
- April 13, 1780 : Pons Simon de Pierre, vicomte de Bernis
- March 10, 1788 : Jean François Béranger, vicomte de Thézan
- February 5, 1792 : Jean-Joseph Christophe de Bazelaire (French: Jean-Joseph Christophe de Bazelaire)
- March 23, 1792 : Claude-Louis de Chartongne (French: Jean-Joseph Christophe de Bazelaire)
- April 11, 1794 : Étienne Alcher

=== Campaign and battles ===
The 1st battalion of the 61st Line Infantry Regiment participated in the wars from 1792 to 1794 in Corsica and in Italy; the 2nd battalion participated in the same époque with the Army of the Eastern Pyrenees (French: armée des Pyrénées-Orientales).

== See also ==
- Troupes de la marine

== Sources and bibliographies ==
- Chronologie historique-militaire, par M. Pinard, tomes 3, 4, 5 et 8, Paris 1761, 1761, 1762 et 1778
