= Regiment of the Crown (France) =

Régiment de La Couronne
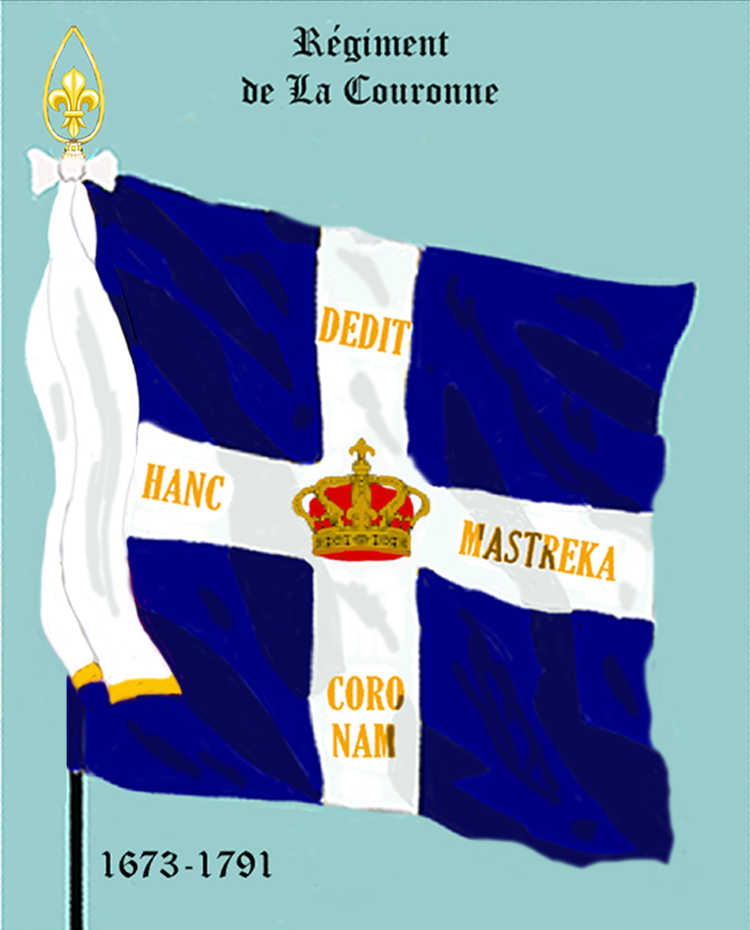
- Ordnance Colors of the Régiment Royal des Vaisseaux
- Active: 1643–1795
- Country: France
- Allegiance: Kingdom of France
- Type: Regiment
- Role: Line Infantry

The Régiment de La Couronne (Regiment of the Crown) was an infantry regiment of the Kingdom of France, created in 1643.

== Lineage ==
- 1643 : creation of the Régiment de La Reine-Mère (Regiment of the Queen Mother)
- 1666 : renamed Régiment de Genlis
- 1666 : renamed Régiment d’Artois
- 1673 : named Régiment de La Couronne (Regiment of the Crown)
- January 1, 1791 : renamed the 45th Line Infantry Regiment
- December 3, 1794 : the 1st Battalion was incorporated into the 89th Battle Demi-Brigade (French: 89^{e} demi-brigade de bataille) when that demi-brigade formed.
- 1795 : the 2nd Battalion was incorporated into the 86th Battle Demi-Brigade (French: 90^{e} demi-brigade de bataille) when it formed.

== Equipment ==
=== Regimental Colors ===
During the Siege of Maastricht (1673), the Régiment d’Artois was renamed La Couronne (The Crown) as a reward for valor, and awarded new regimental arms, a white cross on an azure background with the motto Dedit hanc Mastrika coronam "Maastricht [lui] a valu cette couronne" (Maastricht won this crown).

9 regimental colors out of which one "white", Colonel and eight for ordinance, "all blue with the French Crown in gold in the middle of each white cross".

Ordinance

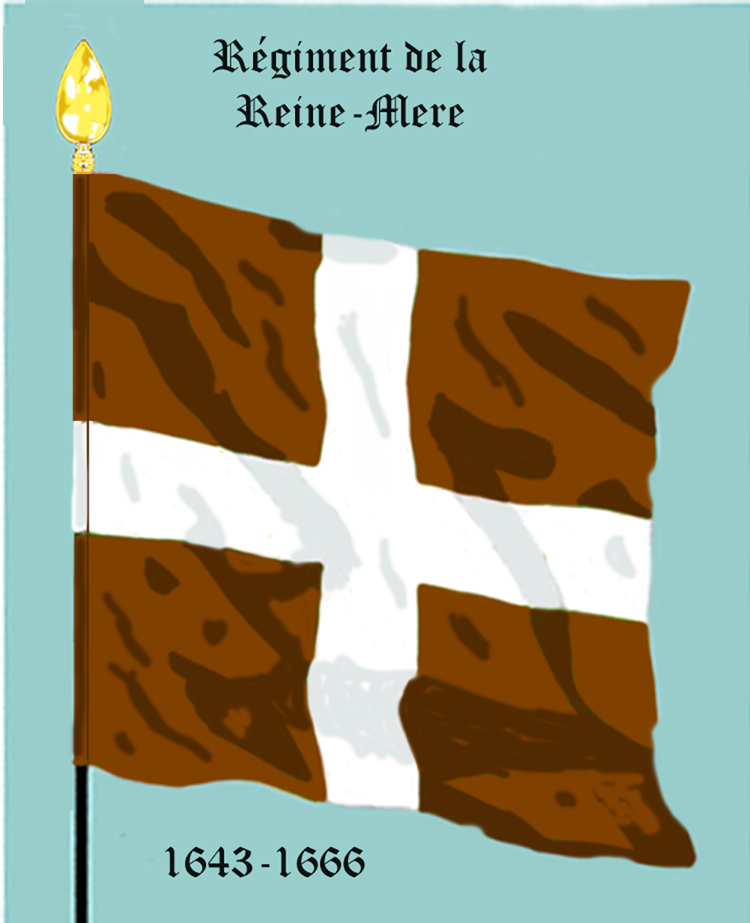
Regiment of the Reine-Mère, 1643 to 1666

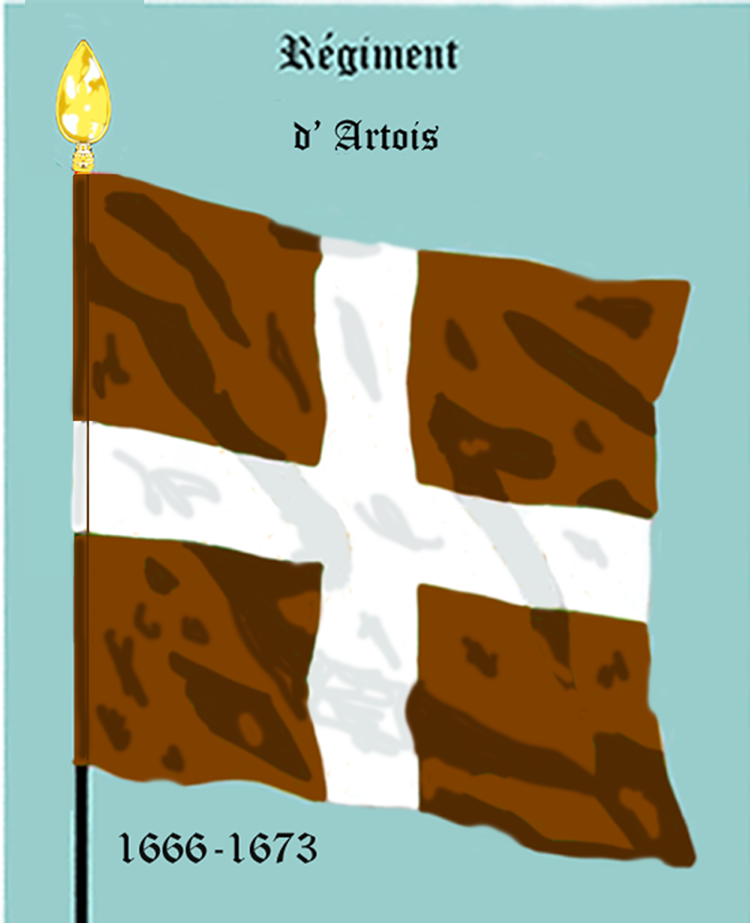
Artois, 1666 to 1673

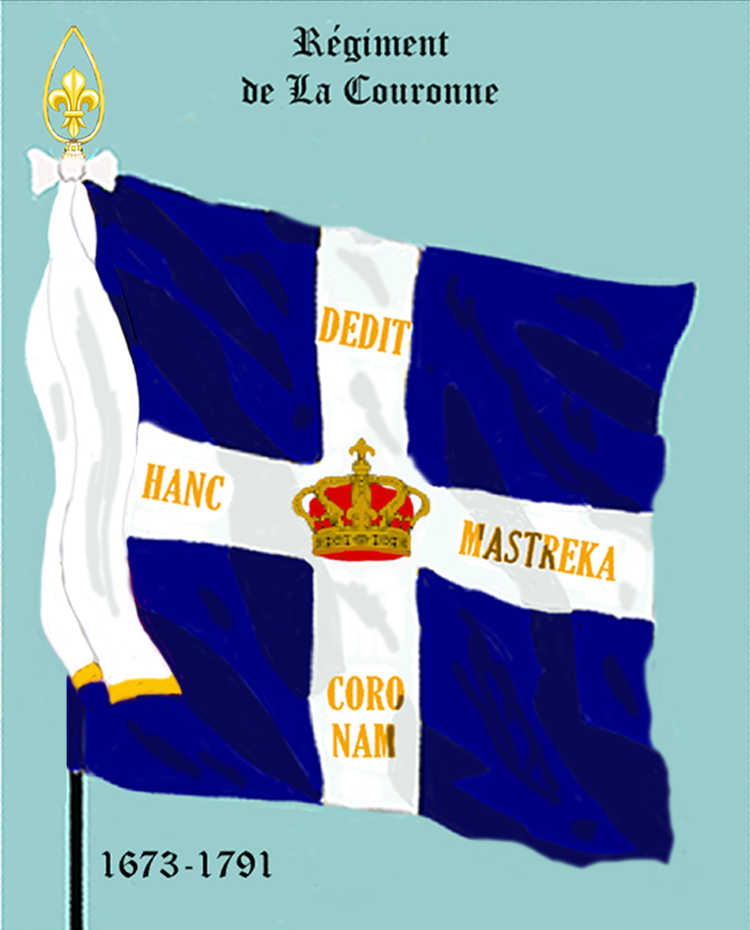
Régiment de La Couronne, 1673 to 1791

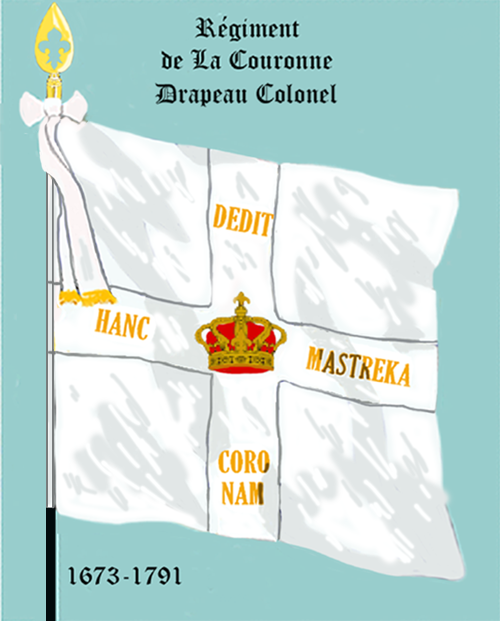
Colonel Flag

=== Uniform ===
Uniforms

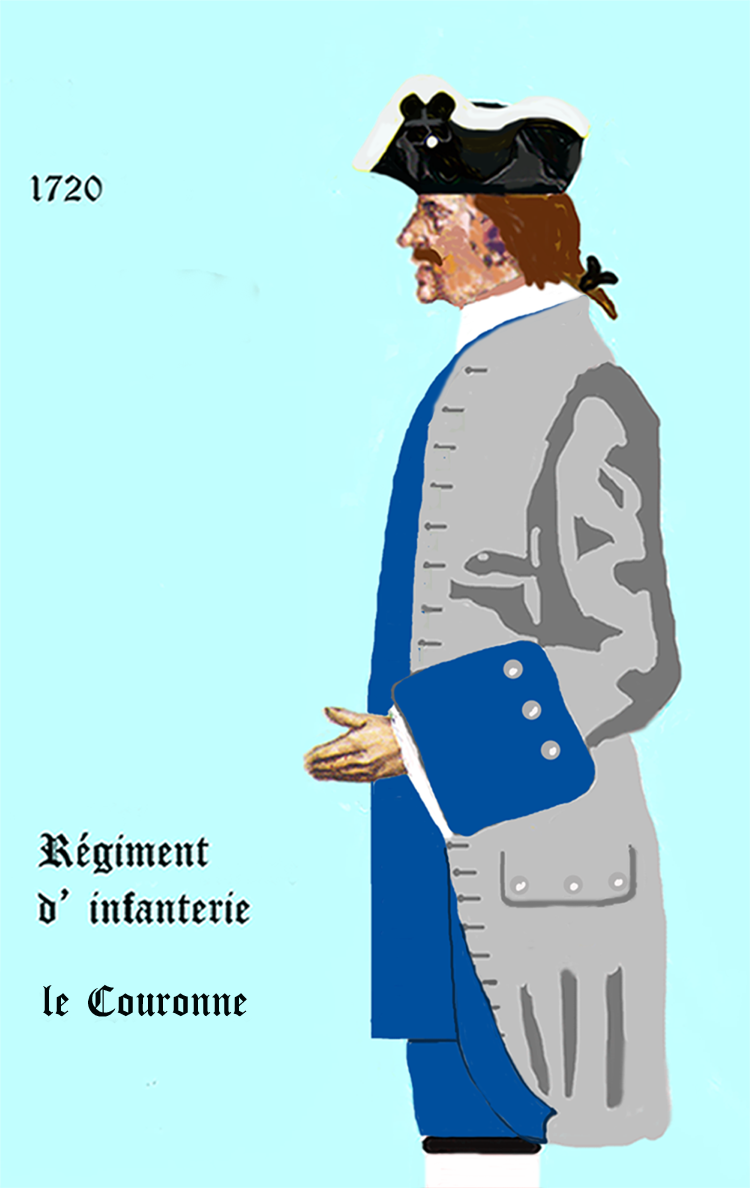
Regiment La Couronne, 1720 to 1734

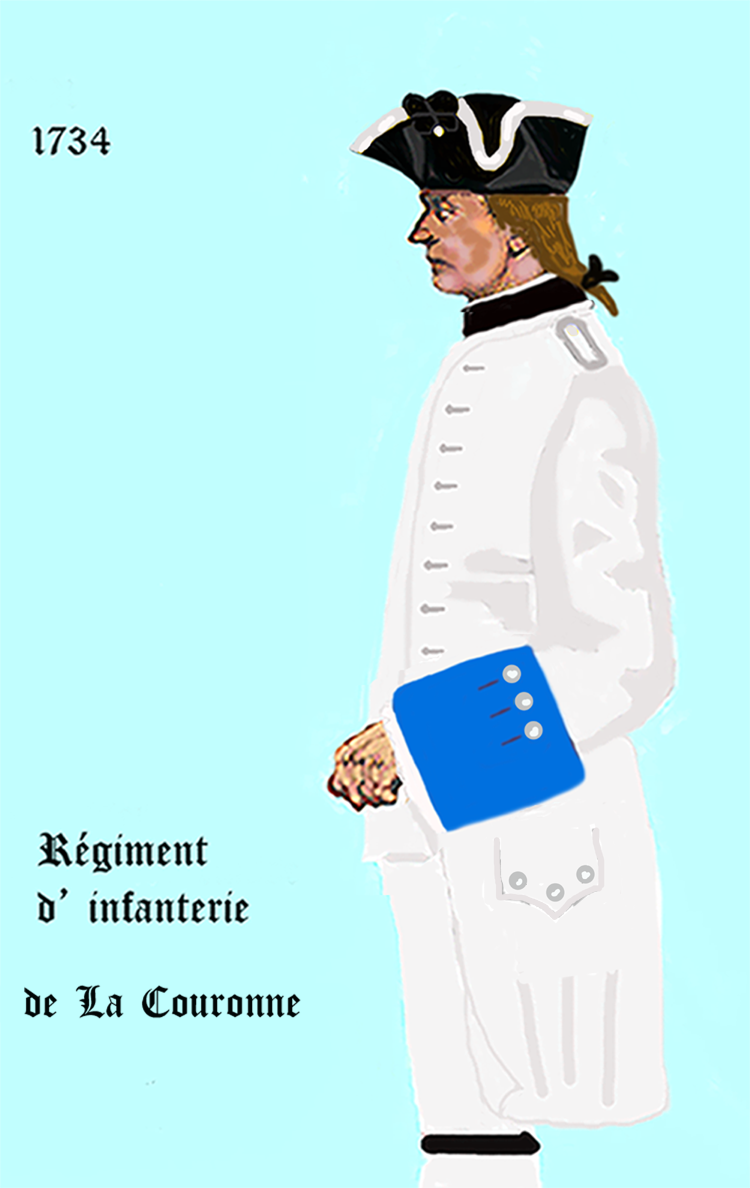
Regiment La Couronne, 1734 to 1757

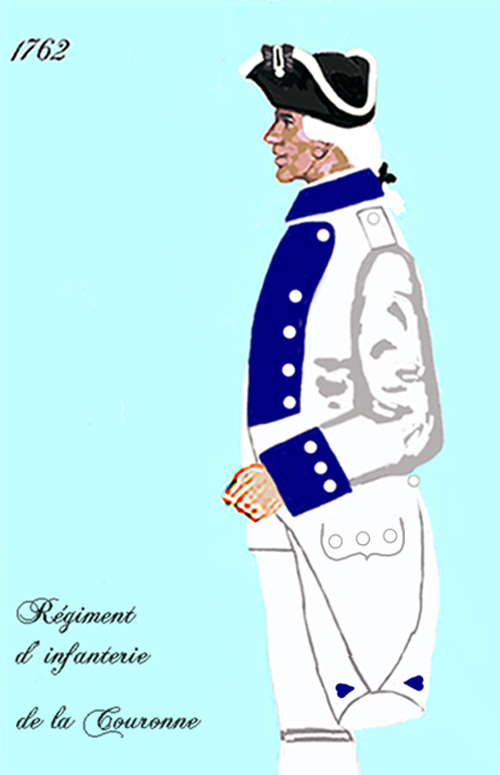
Regiment La Couronne, 1762 to 1776

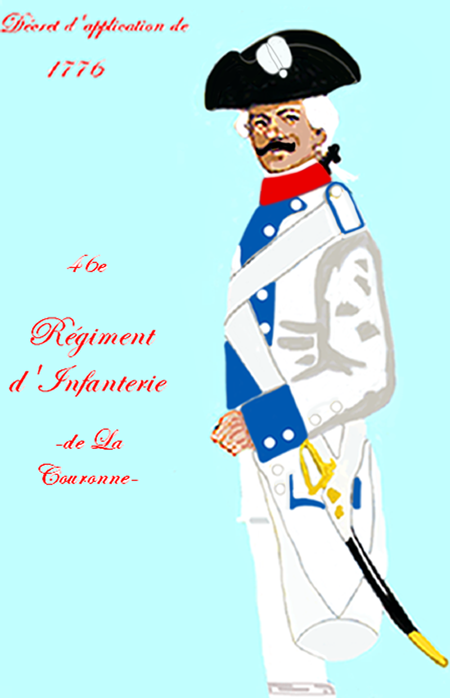
Regiment La Couronne, 1776 to 1779
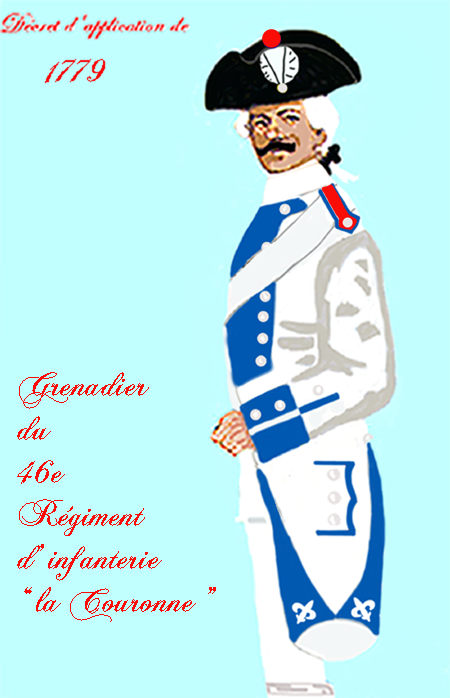
Grenadier of the Régiment La Couronne, 1779 to 1791

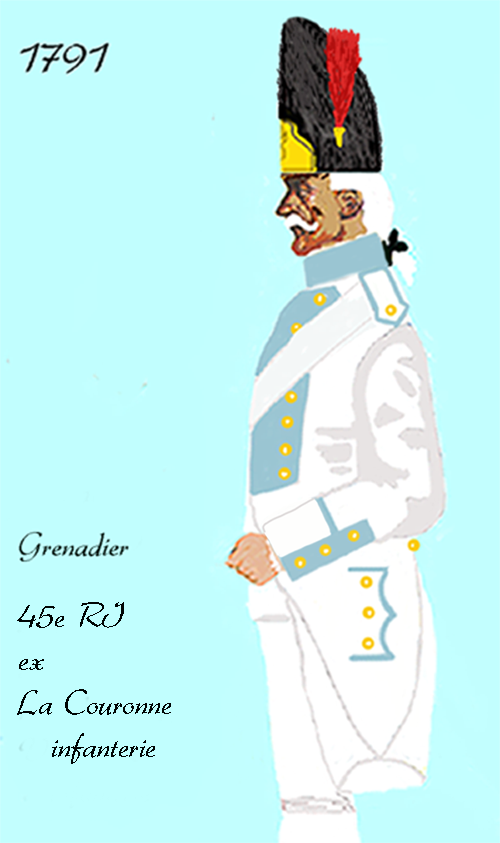
Grenadier of the 45th Line Infantry Regiment, 1791 to 1795

== History ==
=== Colonels and mestres de camp ===
- June 25, 1643: François-Marie de l’Hôpital, Duke of Vitry, Colonel
- June 7, 1757: N. Bruslard, Marquis de Genlis
- June 1673: N. Bruslard, Marquis de Gelis-Bethancourt
- September 1675: N. Bruslard, Marquis de Genlis
- March 12, 1677: Hardouin Bruslard, Chevalier de Genlis
- March 30, 1693: N. de Prunier, Marquis de Saint-André
- July 26, 1698: Louis, Marquis de Polastron
- May 11, 1707: René-François de Froulay, Chevalier de Tessé
- February 17, 1712: Jean François Gabriel, Count of Polastron
- March 10, 1734: Armand Louis de Béthune, Marquis de Charost, killed in 1735 near Trèves
- November 11, 1735: Louis-Ferdinand-Joseph de Croi, Duke of Havré, Colonel-lieutenant
- Mars 14 1758: Marie-Alexandre-Léonor-Louis-César de Saint-Mauris, Count of Montbarrey
- November 30, 1761: Pierre-Constantin Le Vicomte, Count of Blangy
- June 22, 1767: Claude-Antoine de Béziade, Marquis d’Avaray
- November 11, 1782: Marie-Gabriel-Florent-Auguste, Count of Choiseul-Gouffier
- January 1, 1784: Augustin-Louis-Charles, Marquis de Lameth
- October 21, 1791: Joseph-Marie-Anne de Moyria
- March 8, 1793: François Goulu

=== Campaign and battles ===
Régiment de La Couronne

- The Regiment de la Couronne was garrisoned in Bonn during the Siege of Bonn (1703) (French: siège de 1703). On October 13, 1703, the marquis Yves d'Alègre, governor of the city, sent the regiment in a counter-attack. Colonel de Polastron was wounded in action during this operation.
- 45th Line Infantry Regiment

The 45th Line Infantry Regiment participated in the 1792-1793 campaign with the Army of the North (France), and in 1794 with the Army of Sambre and Meuse (French: armée de Sambre-et-Meuse).

== See also ==
- Troupes de la marine

== Sources and bibliographies ==
- Jean Churchill de Marlborough, Histoire de Jean Churchill, duc de Marlborough, vol. 1, Jean Imprimerie Impériale (Paris), 1808, 409 p. (lire en ligne [archive]).
- Oscar, vicomte de Poli, Le Régiment de La Couronne : (1643-1791), Paris, Conseil héraldique de France, 1891, 370 p.
