= Marine Regiment (France) =

Régiment de La Marine
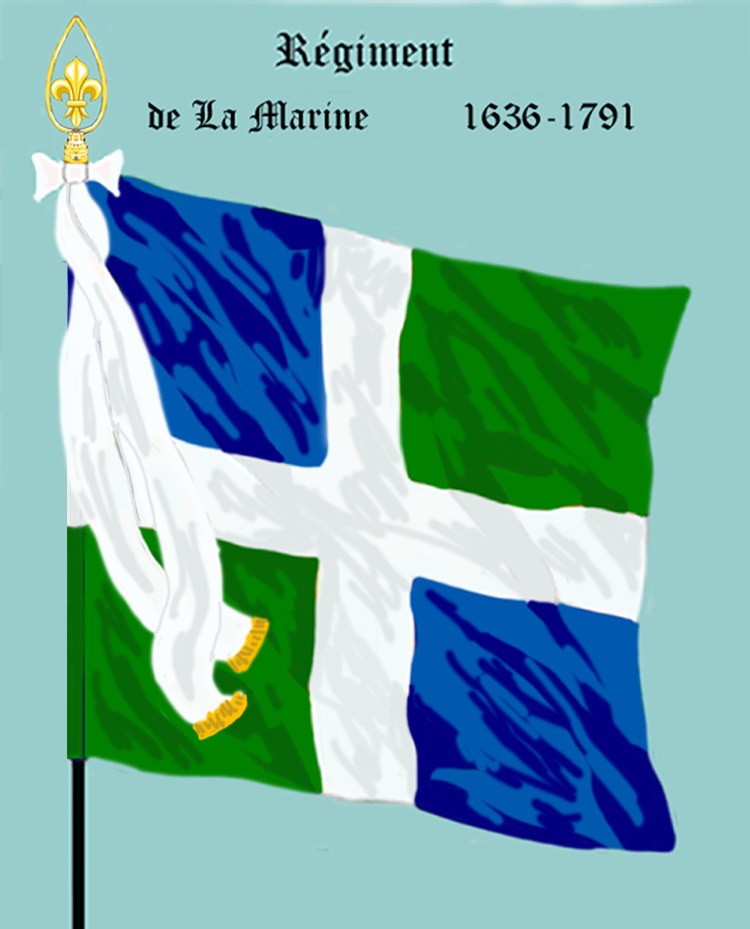
- Ordnance Colors of the Régiment de La Marine
- Active: 1635–1793
- Country: France
- Allegiance: Kingdom of France
- Type: Regiment
- Role: Line Infantry

The Marine Regiment (French: Régiment de La Marine) was an infantry regiment of the French Royal Army raised in 1635. During the French Revolution, it was redesignated as the 11th Infantry Regiment (French: 11^{e} Régiment d'infanterie).

== Equipment ==
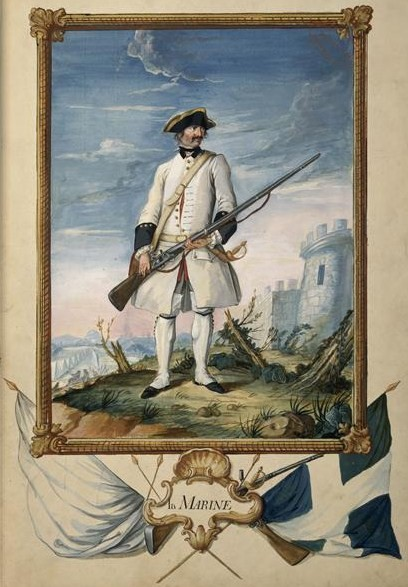
A soldier of the Marine Regiment in 1757

=== Regimental Colors ===
12 regimental colors out of which 1 "white" Colonel, and 11 of Ordinance «blue and green by opposition, white cross ».

Drapeaux d’Ordonnance

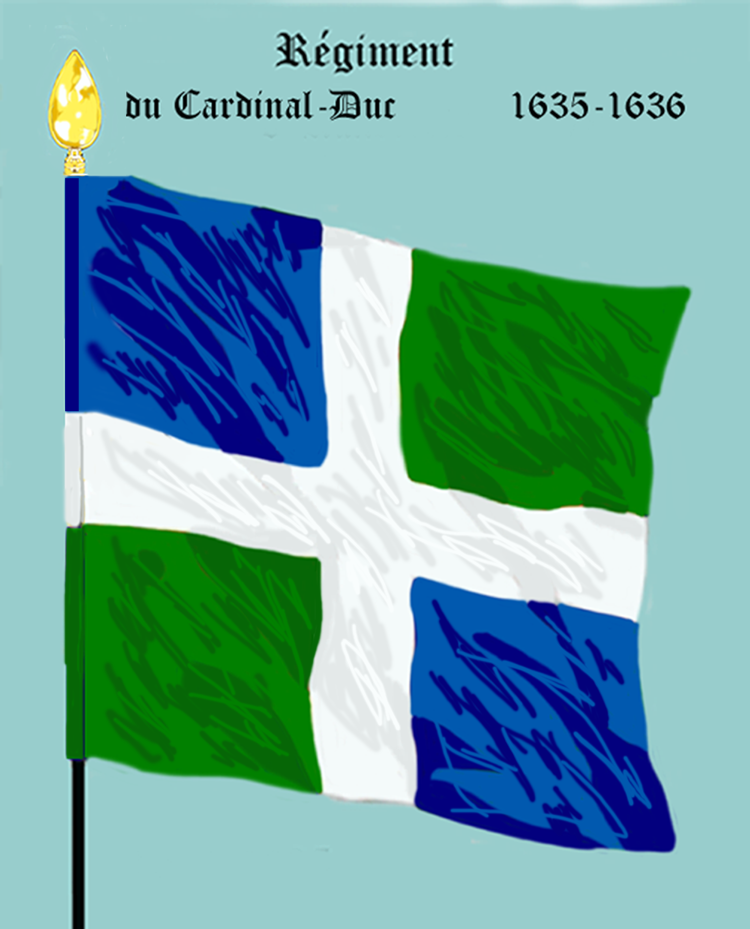
régiment Cardinal-Duc de 1635 à 1636

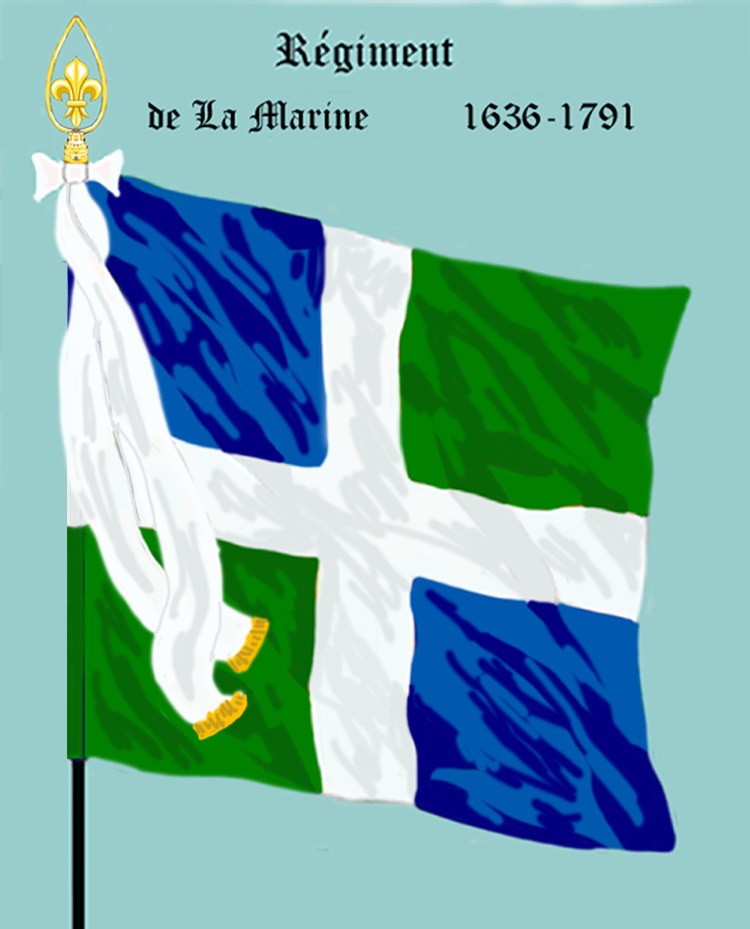
régiment de La Marine de 1636 à 1791

== See also ==
- Troupes de la marine
