= Troupes de la Marine =

French colonial naval force

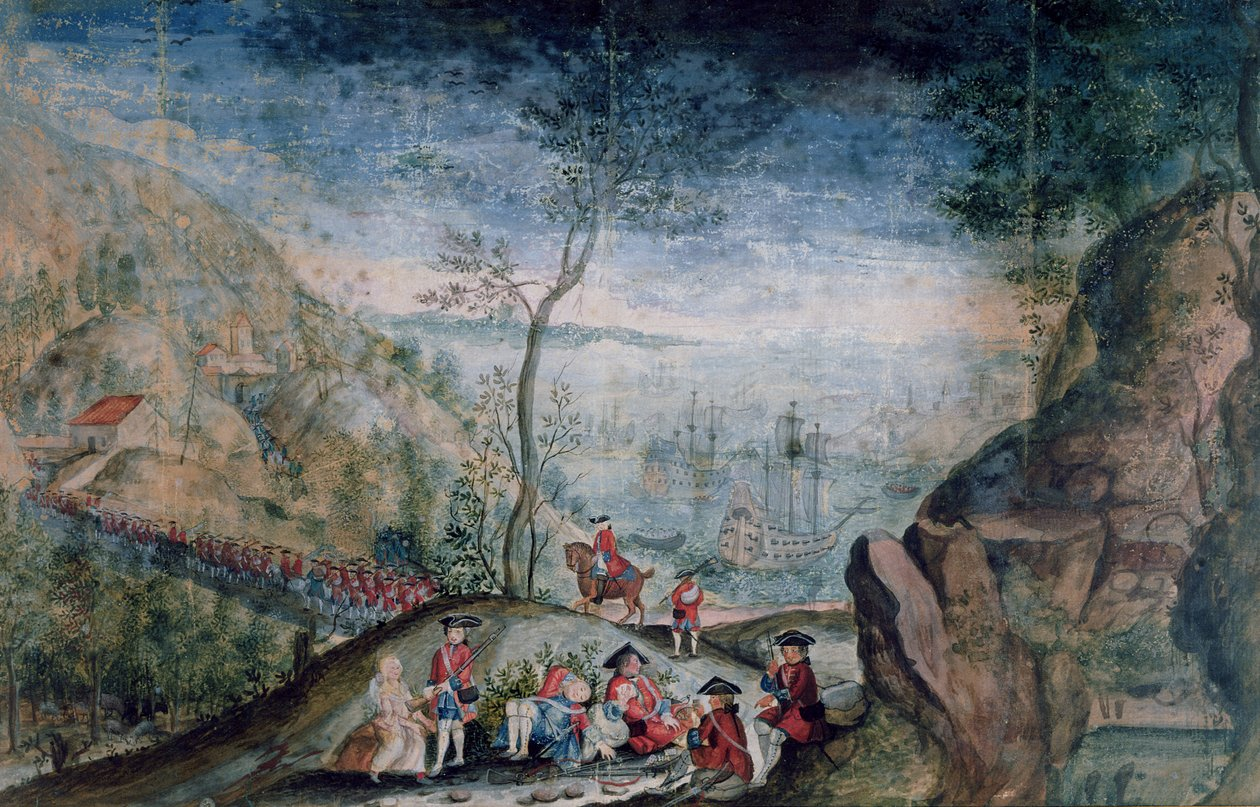
c. 1750 painting of 50 soldiers of the Karrer Regiment disembarking at Louisbourg

The Troupes de la Marine (French pronunciation: [tʁup də la maʁin], lit. 'Troops of the Navy') was a French military formation established by Cardinal Richelieu in 1622. It was under the denomination of compagnie ordinaire de la mer, originally intended to serve as marines on ships of French Navy. In 1674, Jean-Baptiste Colbert decided to make permanent colonial troops, who were named Compagnies Franches de la Marine. They were dissolved in the 19th century and reformed under the new designation of the Troupes de Marine, dependent this time however on the Minister of War (Ministère de la Guerre), which means belonging to the French Army (Armée de terre).

== Organization ==
The development of the European war marines in the 17th century trained the formation of soldiers assigned to the ships. The creation of regular (French: Armée régulière) infantry units for service at sea was relatively late ( compared to the service at sea of the French Army) : prior, soldiers who served at sea were seconded from the French Army. The first regular specific troupe for maritime service appeared in Spain since 1537 (compañías viejas del mar de Nápoles) assigned to the Galley, then in Portugal in 1610 and in France in 1622; the British Royal Marines were founded in 1664 ( under the designation of Foot Maritime Regiment).

=== First Regiments ===
In France, the first specific troupe was created in 1622 by Cardinal Richelieu, under the designation of « Compagnie Ordinaire de la Marine ». These companies were theoretically in numbers of 100, each with for a Captain with Lieutenant de Vaisseau and for a Lieutenant one Enseigne de vaisseau de 1^{re} Classe. In 1626, Richelieu, named Grand-Master Chief and Surintendant of Navigation and Commerce (French: grand-maître chef et surintendant de la navigation et du commerce) orders the merger of the remaining 100 companies to form the Régiment de La Marine, of which the Cardinal was the Mestre de camp. The regiment participated to the Siege of La Rochelle, however was partly destroyed during a later shipwreck.

The entrance into the Franco-Spanish War (1635–59) in 1635 required the mise en place of foot squadrons formed of soldiers. In July 1636 was formed three new regiments, « du Havre », « des Îles » at Brouage and « des Galères » à Marseille, to mount the guard at the three ports and board respectively on board the Squadron of Normandy, the squadron of Guyenne and the Galleys armies; in 1640, these three regiments were assigned to the army and were dissolved at the end of the war. In September 1636, the « Régiment de la Marine » was reconstituted: the regiment served first on board the fleet Count Harcourt and Cardinal de Sourdis ( disembarking at Oristano, preapprehension of the îles de Lérins (French: reprise des îles de Lérins), Battle of Getaria, Siege of Fuenterrabía (1638), the apprehension of Laredo (Cantabrie)), then the fleet was sent to the army to engage in to Battle of Arras (1640) (French: siège d'Arras) (then Spanish) and would never embark again, remaining under the disposition of the Ministre de la Guerre ( the Regiment de La Marine would become the 11th Infantry Regiment (French: 11^{e} Régiment d'Infanterie, 11^{e} RI). In February 1638, the « Régiment de la Couronne » was formed bearing the namesake after the Vaisseau la Couronne which was recently constructed; also was transferred to the Army in 1640 ( 45th Infantry Regiment (French: 45^{e} Régiment d'Infanterie) ). On March 1638, Sourdis assumed the maistrance of the camp of the Régiment de Foix-Candale, then designating the latter by « Régiment des Vaisseaux » (French: Régiment Royal des Vaisseaux) and embarked the regiment on board his fleet; this regiment rejoined also the army deployed in Artois in 1641 ( 43rd Infantry Regiment (French: 43^{e} Régiment d'Infanterie)).

With the arrival of cardinal Mazarin as State Principal Minister (French: Principal ministre d'état), the French Navy no longer had specific troupes and remained in situation short of financial means. With peace prevailing again with the Treaty of the Pyrenees in 1659, a disarmament phase commenced. In 1663, a « Régiment des Navires » ( a ship regiment ) was formed with the remaining of the Galleys and Îles regiments; in 1665, several detachment embarked on the fleet of François de Vendôme, Duc de Beaufort for the expedition of Djidjelli (French: expédition de Djidjelli), before passing at the end of the year to the French East India Company.

In March 1669, Colbert assumed the command of La Marine. In December, the troupes de la Marine reappeared, under the form of two regiments, the « Royal-Marine » (French: Régiment Royal-La Marine) at Rochefort and Brest and the « Amiral » at Toulon, Dunkerque and Coutances. marquis de Louvois, which came in notice of concurrence to his attributions, made of sort to transfer these units to the ministère de la Guerre since 1671, with their mise en place destined in route to join the army engaged in the Franco-Dutch War ( they became later the 60th Infantry Regiment (French: 60^{e} Régiment d'Infanterie) and the 61st Infantry Regiment (French: 61^{e} Régiment d'Infanterie)).

==== Ordinary Sea Companies and Troupes de la marine (1622–1673) ====
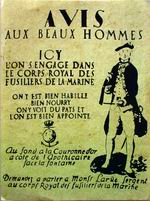
Recruitment affice under Louis XV for the Royal Fusiliers Corps of La Marine.

The first Marine units were the Compagnies Ordinaires de la Mer (Ordinary Sea Companies), created by Cardinal Richelieu in his capacity of Grand Master of Navigation. These companies were merged into a single infantry regiment, dedicated to shipboard and overseas service. These Troupes de la marine were followed by several other regiments, all eventually transferred to the Army between 1640 and 1673. The Army already had soldiers in maritime service since the 17th century.

- Régiment de La Marine (French: Régiment de La Marine) (Regiment of La Marine), formed in 1627 from the Sea Companies. The regiment became the 11th Line Infantry Regiment (French: 11^{e} Régiment d'Infanterie) on 1 January 1791.
- Régiment des Vaisseaux (1638–1643) created by Louis XIII. Refounded by Cardinal Mazarin as Régiment Vaisseau-Mazarin in 1644. Then, the regiment became designated as Régiment Vaisseau-Provence (1658), then became Régiment Royal des Vaisseaux (French: Régiment Royal des Vaisseaux) (Royal Regiment of Naval Ships), set up 1638. The regiment became the 43rd Line Infantry Regiment (French: 43^{e} Régiment d'Infanterie) on 1 January 1791.
- Régiment du Havre (Le Havre Regiment) from (1636–1642)
- Régiment des Isles (Regiment of the Islands), garrisoned at Île de Ré and Oléron from (1636–1663)
- Régiment des Galères (Regiment of the Galleys), garrisoned at Toulon.
- Régiment de La Couronne (French: Régiment de La Couronne) ("Regiment of the Crown") bearing the namesake after Vaisseau la Couronne, formed in 1643. The regiment became designated as the 45th Line Infantry Regiment (French: 45^{e} Régiment d'Infanterie) on 1 January 1791.
- Régiment des Navires ("Regiment of Naval Ships"), formed from the merger of the Le Havre, Les Isles and Les Galères regiments in 1663. The regiment was transferred to the French East India Company in 1664.
- Régiment Royal–La Marine (French: Régiment Royal-La Marine) ("Royal Regiment- La Marine") created in 1669 by avid Marine Royal developer naval state secretary Jean-Baptiste Colbert and attached to the Flotte du Ponant. The regiment was transferred to the French Army in 1671 and became the 60th Line Infantry Regiment (French: 60^{e} Régiment d'Infanterie) on 1 January 1791.
- Régiment de l'Amiral de France ("Admiral Regiment of France") (French: Régiment de l'Amiral de France) created in 1669 by Naval State Secretary Colbert and attached to the Levant Fleet. The regiment became the 61st Infantry Regiment in 1671 (French: 61^{e} Régiment d'Infanterie) and a Line Regiment in 1803.

=== Compagnies Franches de la Marine ===
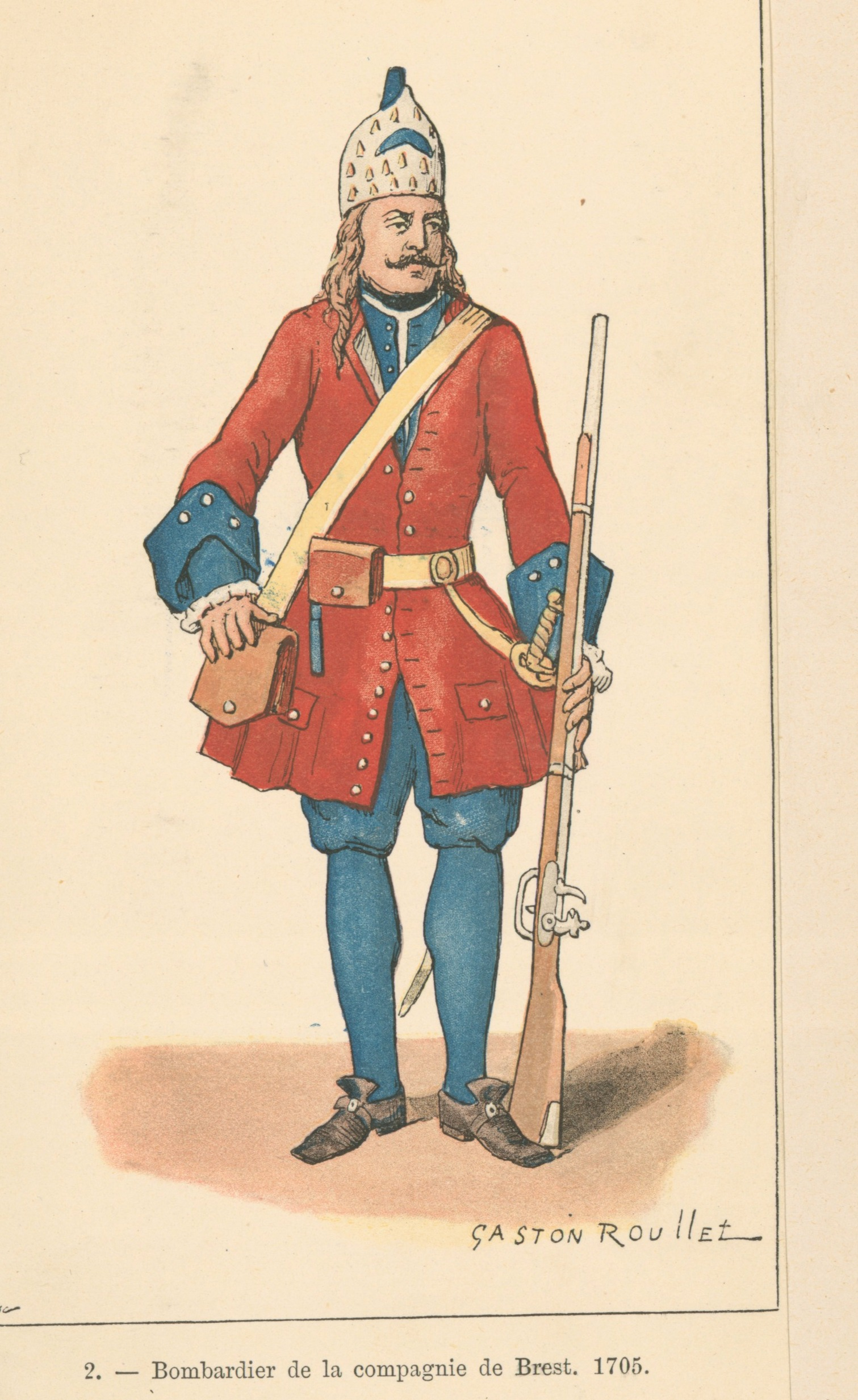
Bombardier of the Brest company, 1705.

Following the obstacles faced by the first regiments, the recruitment of soldiers for la marine followed for each armament, however without organization. Starting 1671, small detachments of guards were organized to guard the arsenals; they were organized in three companies in 1674, at Toulon, Rochefort and Brest. In 1685, an ordinance created in addition three companies in demi-solde (one per port) to maintain an available reserve, soldiers to the demi-solde when the ships were disarmed. In 1689, the company of guards and demi-solde are designated as « compagnies de soldats-gardiens » ("companies of guardian soldiers"), deployed at Le Havre, Brest, Lorient, Rochefort and Toulon.

In 1666, three companies of apprentice cannon men was put in place, at Brest, Rochefort and Toulon; their mission was to form during one year sailors of classes to serve as chief of artillery pieces, assistant cannon men, second-masters, and masters of cannon. In 1689, the ordinance of 15 April signed by count de Ponchchartrain regularized two companies of bombardiers ( a first one was detached from the army of Toulon since 1682 ). These men, specialized in the artillery (naval cannons), were notably destined to serve on the new bomb ketches.

The Nine Years' War requiring necessary to have soldiers at disposition, Pontchartain received from the King, the ordinance of 16 December 1690 creating 80 infantry companies, designated as Compagnies Franches de la Marine, despite the opinion of Louvois. The structure formation was composed of one lieutenant de vaisseau (with an infantry captain commission) and two ensigns (one serving as lieutenant, the other as an infantry ensign), the soldiers being the former guardian-soldiers.

The effectifs and the number of companies evolved in function of the need and the budgetary needs, as well the location of the garrison: the ordinance stipulated companies of 80 men, spread between Toulon, Rochefort, Port-Louis, Brest, le Havre and Dunkerque. Since 26 December, effectifs passed to 86 companies, then to 88 companies and then 100 starting October 1691. Effectifs passed theoretically to 100 men per company, as in a force of 10000 soldiers in total. The treaty Ryswick (French: Traité de Ryswick) in 1697 led to the reduction to 50 men due to budgetary reasons; however, while preparing for the following war, effectifs passed to 60 in 1701, to 75 in January 1702 and to 100 in November 1705 during the War of the Spanish Succession.

The Treaty of Utrecht in 1713 reduced the effectifs to 50 men per company, the Régence made them fall to 35, then to 25 in December 1725. In 1727, the number of companies passed from 100 to 50, with theoretical effectifs to 60 men. In 1733, the War of the Polish Succession increases the effectifs to 80, which are reduced to 60 starting 1736, to increase again to 80 in December 1739. On September 1740, the preparation of the War of the Austrian Succession required the creation of 10 supplementary companies. The Treaty of Aix-la-Chapelle (1748) allowed a couple of reforms, with the merger of the Galleys Corps (French: Corps des Galères) with Ships Corps (French: Corps des Vaisseaux) (the 15 companies of the Galleys Corps formed the 18 companies of Compagnies Franches de la Marine) within a formation consisting 100 companies with 50 men (40 companies for the disembarking at Brest, 16 for that of Rochefort, and 44 for that of Toulon). In 1755, the theoretical effectifs increase to 100 men per company, with the authorization of a dozen od sub numerations, however the outcomes of the Seven Years' War (Battle of Lagos in August 1759 and Battle of Quiberon Bay in November 1759) decreased the effectifs to 50 since December 1759.

=== Régiment de Karrer ===
- Régiment de Karrer, (from 1752 de Hallwyl) a Swiss foreign regiment in French colonial service 1719–1763 under the Ministry of Marine.

=== Successive reforms from 1761 to 1792 ===
Starting 15 October 1761, The Duke of Choiseul assumed the portfolios of "la Marine" (the Navy) and "la Guerre" (the Army). Consequently, all the companies of "La Marine" were cancelled by the ordinance dated 5 November 1761, with the embarked service to be handled by the French Army. The ordinance date 10 December 1762 mandated for the garrison of vessels (French: Vaisseaux), the guard of ports and colonies, 23 line regiments, to receive the soldiers of the previous Compagnies Franches. Three artillery brigades are constituted to serve at sea ( each with eight companies) receiving the sailors and soldiers formed at handling the cannons, being commanded by officers of the vessels completed by the land artillery officers.

The following minister, César Gabriel de Choiseul, reformed again the troupes de marine, by founding the ordinance dated 24 September 1769 « Corps royal d'artillerie et d'infanterie de la marine » ( royal marine artillery and infantry corps ). This corps was organized in three brigades (Brest, Rochefort and Toulon), each composed of a bombardier company, four de canonnier ( of cannons ) and three de Fusiliers ( of fusiliers ). The officers were vessel officers. These effectifs of 2212 men ( in theory ) remained insufficient for the arms, with complementary additions being retrieved from the line infantry.

1774 Corps royal d'infanterie de la marine ( royal infantry corps of the navy)

1782 Corps royal de la marine (royal corps of the navy)

1786 Corps des canonniers-matelots (Corps of artillery-sailors)

=== Troupes of the Republic and the Empire ===
1792 Corps d'infanterie et d'artillerie de la marine (infantry and artillery corps of the navy)

1795 Corps d'artillerie de marine ( Marine artillery corps)

1813 régiments de marine ( Marine regiment )

== Missions ==
The troupes of La Marine had to ensure the guarding of the arsenals and military ports, provide detachments on board warships as well as in the colonies (in Canada, Antilles and India). These units were then part of all naval battles and embarking.

For instance, for the Compagnies Franches de la Marine, a couple of them charged at the Battle of Camaret in June 1694; others disembarked during the Siege of Barcelona (1697) for form a « Bataillon des Vaisseaux » (Vessel battalion); during the Battle of Málaga (1704), the companies endured the loss of 150 officers and 1500 soldiers; 4000 soldiers of marines participated to the Twelfth Siege of Gibraltar. The companies in garrison at Dunkerque participated to the Battle of Malplaquet in 1709 and the Battle of Denain in 1712. 2500 men of the companies participated to the Battle of Rio de Janeiro under the orders of René Duguay-Trouin in 1711. From 1756 to 1760, three companies mount the garrison at port Mahon on Minorque.

=== Embarked service ===
Detachments of embarked soldiers in 1740
Naval Ship	Crew	Soldiers
Vaisseaux de premier rang (French: premier rang)	600 à 800	200 à 252
Vaisseaux de deuxième rang (French: deuxième rang)	400 à 500	119 à 140
Vaisseaux de troisième rang (French: troisième rang)	250 à 350	75 à 94
Vaisseaux de quatrième rang (French: quatrième rang)	200 à 250	60 à 68
Vaisseaux de cinquième rang (French: cinquième rang)	120 à 150	27 à 37
Frigate	50	15

=== Land service ===
==== In New-France ====
The troupes de la Marine were sent by Louis XIV in 1682 to replace the regular troops in New France, and were accordingly used to mount the garrisons in the various French colonies. Between 1683 and 1688, the King sent thirty-five companies to Canada. However, as the mortality and licensing of soldiers who were getting married and made themselves residents increased, numbers diminished considerably. Accordingly, Seignelay decided to reduce the number of companies to twenty eight on 24 May 1689. This number would remain unchangeable until the beginning of the seven-year war. Versailles accordingly sent reinforcements by the fixing the number of companies at forty. At the end of the French regime, 2,600 soldiers of the troupes de la Marine were present in Canada. These effectifs were relatively important compared to the resident population since in 1688 for example, Canada housed 1,418 soldiers for a population of almost 10,300. In a first phase, the officers present in Canada, all hailed from France. However, since 1685, the Canadian « gentilshommes » secured positions in the troupes de marine. The first two, La Durantaye and Bécancourt, embarked for Rochefort where they received a guard formation in la marine. Quite quickly, the officer corps of the troupes de la marine becomes Canadian « canadianise ». At the beginning of the 18th century, almost a third of the officers were born in Canada, then more than half of the officer corps in 1722. The officers were practically all recruited locally.

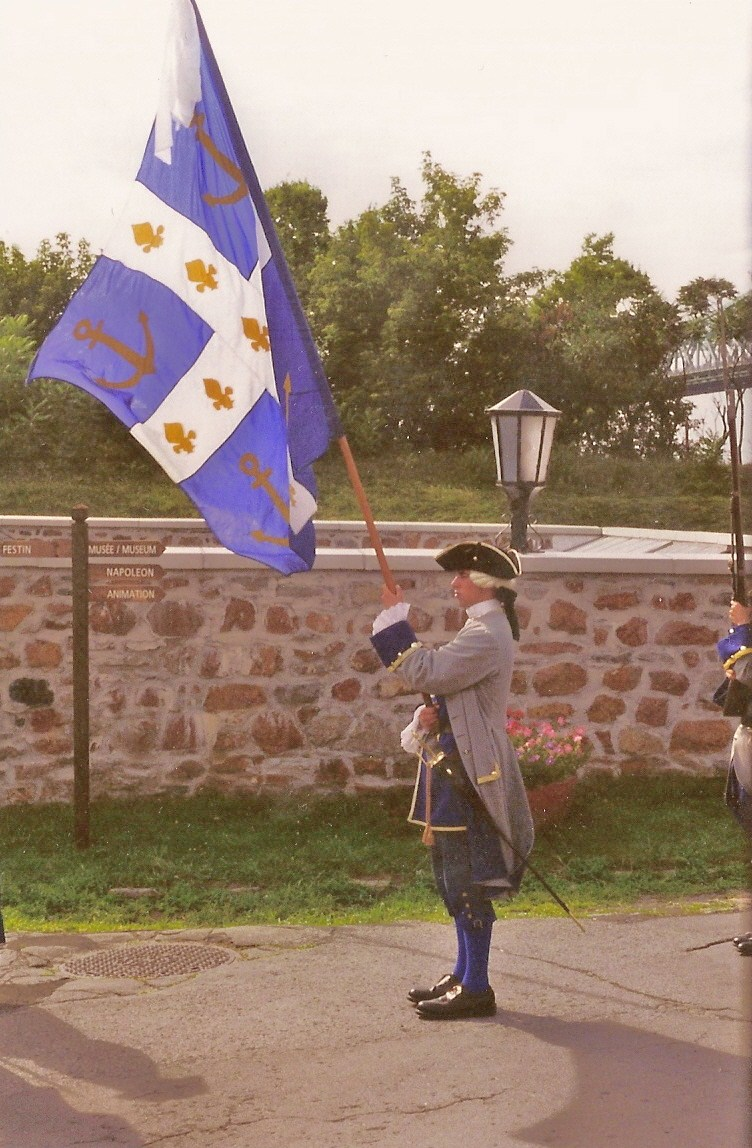
Flag of Troupes de la Marine

The troupes de la Marine were the only regular troops in Nouvelle-France from 1682 to 1755, while several other battalions were sent to North America. The majority of the officers and soldiers were recruited in France, while the officers became more often Canadian. Service in the troupes de la Marine was an important source of economic opportunity, and a prestige for the elite of Nouvelle-France. There was often a waiting list to be nominated as an officer in the companies of the troupes de la marine. While the force of the troupes varied from one period to another, during the Seven Years' War, there were forty companies in the valley of Saint-Laurent and at the Pays d'en Haut; twenty at the Fortress of Louisbourg, in addition to Louisiana and Acadia. Significant garrisons were held at Quebec, Montreal, and New Orleans, with small forces guarding the forts and posts across the vast territory of the North America during the 18th century.

The companies were known as the colonial regular troops, and they were very well trained in the arts of conventional warfare and very well adapted to the "guerre amérindienne" (commonly known as guerilla warfare). In concert with the Canadian militias and the allied guerrilla units, the troupes de la marine were essentially in charge of mounting the defensive in Nouvelle-France during the 17th and 18th century. With the important arrival of British forces in 1755, the nature of the conflict in the Americas changed from irregular troops to conventional troops, with a particular importance around the sieges and fortifications. Battalions were sent to protect Nouvelle-France after 1755.

During the Seven Years' War, the garrison of Louisburg was made captive with the fortress falling. After the conquest of 1760, many former veterans permanently established themselves in the new territory, while other were repatriated with reticence to France.

== Notable members ==
- François Dupont Duvivier
- Jacques Testard de Montigny
- Michel Maray de La Chauvignerie
- Antoine de la Mothe Cadillac

== See also ==
- Military of New France
- Colonial militia in Canada
- Compagnies Franches de la Marine
- Louisbourg Garrison

=== Bibliography ===
- Coste, Gabriel (1893). Les anciennes troupes de la marine (1622–1792). Paris: Librairie militaire de L. Baudoin.
- Arnaud Balvay, Les hommes des troupes de la marine en Nouvelle-France (1683–1763), Mémoires vives,22, Octobre, 2007, .

=== References ===
- Greer, Allan. "The People of New France" (Toronto: University of Toronto Press, 1997), pp. 50–51.
- Greer, Allan. "The Soldiers of Isle Royale, 1720–45" (Environment Canada, 1979), pp. 7–9.
- Sutherland, Stuart R. J. (1988). "Troupes de la Marine". The Canadian Encyclopedia. Vol. 4. Edmonton: Hurtig Publishers. p. 2196.
