= Richard O'Farrell =

Richard O'Farrell may refer to:

- Richard O'Farrell (British Army officer) (died 1757), British Army officer
- Richard O'Farrell (Irish Confederate), Irish soldier of the seventeenth century
