= General Whitmore =

General Whitmore may refer to:

- Edmund Whitmore (1819–1890), British Army lieutenant general
- Edward Whitmore (1691–1761), British Army brigadier general
- George Whitmore (British Army officer) (1775–1862), British Army major general
- William Whitmore (British Army officer) (1714–1771), British Army lieutenant general
