= Patrick MacKellar =

British army officer and military engineer

Patrick Mackellar
- Born: 1717; London, England, Great Britain
- Died: 1778 (aged 60–61)
- Allegiance: Great Britain
- Service years: 1742–1777
- Conflicts: Seven Years' War; Battle of the Monongahela; Battle of Fort Oswego (POW); Siege of Louisbourg; Battle of Sainte-Foy; Siege of Havana
- Children: 2 sons

Colonel Patrick Mackellar (1717 – 1778) was a British army officer and military engineer who played a significant role in the early history of North America. He was the deputy chief engineer at the Siege of Louisbourg (1758) and the chief engineer at the siege of Quebec in 1759. In later years he was responsible for the design and construction of the town of Es Castell on the island of Menorca.

== Early life and career ==
Patrick Mackellar was born in 1717, the son of John, the last Mackellar to be head tenant of a small town. In 1735, probably through the influence of the Second Duke of Argyll he entered the Ordnance service, at that time very separate from the Army, as a clerk at Woolwich Arsenal. Four years later, he was promoted to clerk of the works and posted to Menorca. His aptitude for engineering works was recognized on 7 December 1742 when he was granted a warrant as practitioner engineer, the lowest rank in the Corps of Engineers. In Menorca, he worked on improving the defences of Port Mahon. These defences relied heavily on the great fortress of St Philip at the mouth of the harbour. On 8 March 1744, Mackellar was promoted to engineer extraordinary and on 31 July 1751 to engineer in ordinary; on 1 December 1745, he was also appointed an ensign in Wynyard's Regiment (4th Marines), presumably by purchase. Having returned to England, on 24 November 1754 he was designated by royal warrant as one of the engineers to accompany Major-General Edward Braddock to America.

== 7 Years War ==
Mackellar first saw active service when he took part in the Braddock Expedition (along with the young George Washington) against Fort Duquesne (now Pittsburgh, Pennsylvania) in 1755. He was severely wounded in the Battle of the Monongahela on 9 July, when Braddock and 976 British and provincial soldiers out of the 1,459 deployed were killed (67%), but by the following spring he was at Fort Oswego as chief engineer of the frontier forts. During the summer, Mackellar was engaged in repairing and strengthening the obsolete fortifications at Oswego, a difficult task as the original defences had been poorly sited and laid out. On 11 August, a French force of 3,000 men under the command of the Marquis de Montcalm appeared and the First Battle of Fort Oswego ensued. The British surrendered during the afternoon of 14 August and Mackellar, having survived the subsequent massacre perpetrated by Montcalm's native allies, was taken to Quebec City where he was kept closely guarded. He was able, however, to make detailed notes on the city's defences and his report, bearing the initials "PM" and of which several copies still exist, is dated September 1756. At some time in September, he was transferred to Montreal and after some months as a prisoner-of-war, Mackellar was exchanged. He returned to Britain early in 1757 and on 14 May, when all military engineers were finally given army rank, he was commissioned a captain in the Corps of Engineers. In December 1757, following a meeting with a fellow ex-prisoner-of-war named Moss, it would appear that Mackellar had time to draw upon his notes in order to compile a postscript to his report, which was dated and initialled 23 December 1757, and to arrange the production of a map. It was undoubtedly his recent experiences in New France and the important intelligence contained in his report that prompted his next appointment.

On 4 January 1758, Mackellar was promoted to major and sub-director of engineers and was appointed deputy to Colonel John Henry Bastide in the expedition against Louisbourg, the key to control of the St Lawrence River, the vital supply line of Canada.

The British forces disembarked in Gabarus bay, a couple of miles from their objective, on 8 June 1758 and commenced the Second Siege of Louisbourg. Mackellar initially accompanied the then Brigadier-General James Wolfe on his rapid, left-flanking thrust to encircle the town and to place batteries at the entrance to the harbour on the opposite shore to the town. On 8 July, when Bastide was wounded, Mackellar became the acting chief engineer. Although Wolfe was impatient with the slow progress of the siege (and let his unflattering opinion of military engineers be generally known), it appears that not a little of the credit for the capitulation of Louisbourg on 27 July was due to Mackellar's professional skill. It was not therefore surprising that a few months later, Mackellar was selected to serve as chief engineer in the expedition that Wolfe was to command against Quebec.

In May 1759, the army of 8,500 men assembled at Louisbourg and then sailed up the St Lawrence to Quebec. During the siege of Quebec, the information contained in Mackellar's report proved to be invaluable. Although much of it was out of date, it nonetheless provided Wolfe with the only substantial body of intelligence about his objective, and Mackellar became one of Wolfe's few trusted advisers.

Despite being wounded in an earlier attack on 31 July near the Montmorency River, Mackellar sited the British batteries and conducted all preliminary siege operations against Quebec. He also devised and tested methods of landing infantry from floating stages. He advised Wolfe against a frontal attack upon the city and accompanied the general on his final reconnaissance.

Mackellar was with Wolfe during the famous scaling of the cliffs on the night of 12/13 September and, immediately after the victory at the Battle of the Plains of Abraham, he prepared to extend the siege operations against the newly exposed walls of the upper city, but the capitulation of Quebec five days later made these efforts unnecessary. During the autumn of 1759 and the spring of 1760, he strengthened the defences of the city against an expected French counterattack, and had the direction of the artillery in the force under Brigadier-General James Murray at the Battle of Sainte-Foy on 28 April. Although critically wounded in the battle and subsequent withdrawal through Sillery to Quebec, Mackellar supervised the defence of the city during his convalescence and up until the arrival of a British squadron in May forced the French to raise the siege. He later took part in the capture of Montreal and other engagements, thus completing the defeat of the French in Canada.

In November 1760, Mackellar was appointed chief engineer at Halifax, Nova Scotia, where he initiated important works to improve the defences and devoted much time and energy to training troops for siege operations. On 7 January 1762, he arrived in Martinique as chief engineer with General Monckton's expedition to that island. By 4 February, after a difficult siege, Fort Royal was captured and the whole island surrendered soon after. Monkton's force was then reinforced by further troops from England for an attack on Havana for which Mackellar was again appointed chief engineer. On 7 June, the troops landed in Cuba and began the campaign by besieging the fort of El Morro that was strategically sited at the harbour entrance opposite the city of Havana. In desperately hot conditions and ravaged by disease, the British forces made slow progress, but on 30 July two mines were exploded, caving in the huge ditch protecting the landward side of El Morro. The breach was stormed, the fort captured and the rest of the island surrendered soon after. It was Mackellar's journal that formed the basis of the report of the capture of Havana in the London Gazette of 7 September 1762. Mackellar, however, was dangerously wounded during the siege of Morro Castle and never completely recovered.

== Later life and death ==
After the Treaty of Paris in 1763, Mackellar was posted back to Menorca, where he again worked on improving the defences. He was promoted brevet lieutenant-colonel on 3 January 1762, lieutenant-colonel on 2 February 1775, and director of engineers and colonel on 29 August 1777. Probably at some time while in Menorca, he married Elizabeth Basaline and had two sons. His elder son John was born in Menorca in 1768. He rose to the rank of admiral of the blue, despite being court-martialed and dismissed the service in 1802, and served in Halifax from 1804 to 1810 as agent for prisoners of war and transports and as governor of the naval hospital. Patrick's descendants include Major-General Charles Townshend, the "hero of Kut-al-Amara", and Steven Fletcher who was a first quadriplegic Canadian member of parliament (2004–2015), member of the federal cabinet and the queens privy council (2008).

From 1763 until his death on 22 October 1778, Mackellar was engaged in rebuilding and fortifying the harbour at Mahon. One of the main reasons for the relatively rapid fall of Fort St Philip in 1756 had been the proximity of Philip's Town to the fortifications. This settlement had sprung up around the fortress in response to the lack of quartering for soldiers within the fort itself and in the inevitable way that taverns, sutlers, families and less reputable women coalesced around the armies of that time. When the French began their siege operations they were able to use the town to conceal their approach from the fire of the fort and to provide ready material for the building of their batteries.

Following the destruction of Philip's Town, Mackellar designed and supervised the building of a new military town at a distance of about a mile from the fort, which town is now called Es Castell. The town is laid out in a grid pattern with a magnificent parade ground in the centre that is now the town square. In 2002, the bicentenary of the return of Menorca from Britain to Spain, a plaque was erected in his memory in the main street of Es Castell.

Mackellar left interesting and valuable accounts of the principal operations in which he was involved including “Plan of the town of Quebec the capital of Canada . . . showing the principal encampments and works of the British army commanded by Major General Wolfe and those of the French army commanded by Lieut. General the Marquis of Montcalm”. "A sketch of the field of Battle of July 9th upon the Monongahela seven miles from Fort Du Quesne, showing the Disposition of the Troops when the Action began" is considered the best map detailing events during Braddock's defeat. Another notable report was his "A Correct Journal of the Landing of His Majesty's Forces on the Island of Cuba, and of the Siege and Surrender of the Havannah, August 13th, 1762."
