= Augustin de Boschenry de Drucour =

French military officer (1703–1762)

- Born: March 27, 1703; Drucourt, France
- Died: August 28, 1762 (aged 59); Le Havre, France
- Military career
- Allegiance: France
- Branch: French Navy
- Conflicts: French and Indian War: Siege of Louisbourg

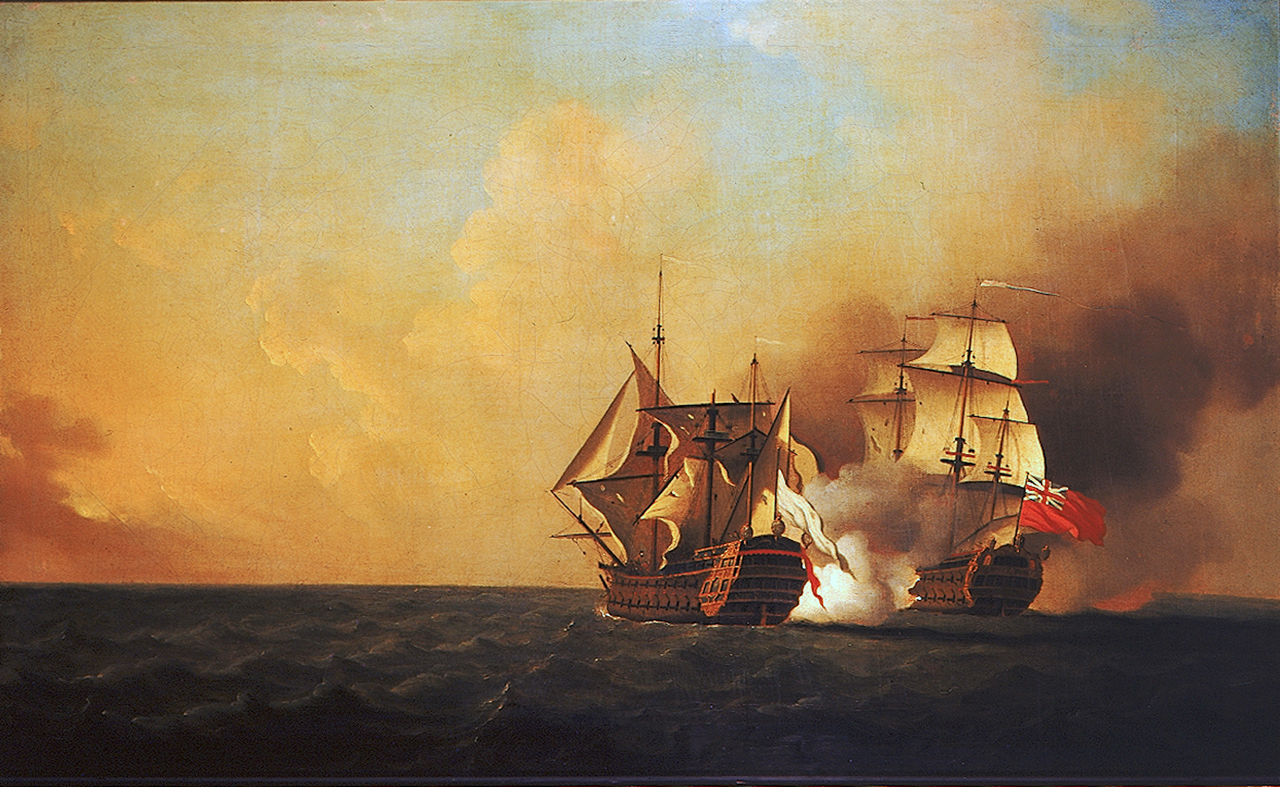
Samuel Scott's depiction of action between the French ship Mars, en route back to Europe after the great storm, and HMS Nottingham, 11 October 1746

Augustin de Boschenry de Drucour or de Drucourt (signed Chevalier de Drucour, baptized March 27, 1703—August 28, 1762) was a French military officer, who led the French defence in the Siege of Louisbourg.

He was a son of Jean-Louis de Boschenry, Baron de Drucourt and Marie-Louise Godard. Drucour joined the French Navy in 1719 as a midshipman in Toulon.

In October 1746, while aboard the Mars, a French naval vessel which was returning to France as part of the failed Duc d'Anville Expedition, he was taken prisoner by the British, and imprisoned for a year before returning to France.

He became a ship captain in 1751. In 1754, he was appointed Governor of Île Royale. During his career he made 16 major voyages to such places as Copenhagen, Stockholm, Martinique and Saint-Domingue.

Political offices
Preceded by Jean-Louis de Raymond	Governor of Île-Royale; 1754-1758	Surrendered to British; Governor of Nova Scotia; Charles Lawrence
