= French ship Prudent (1753) =

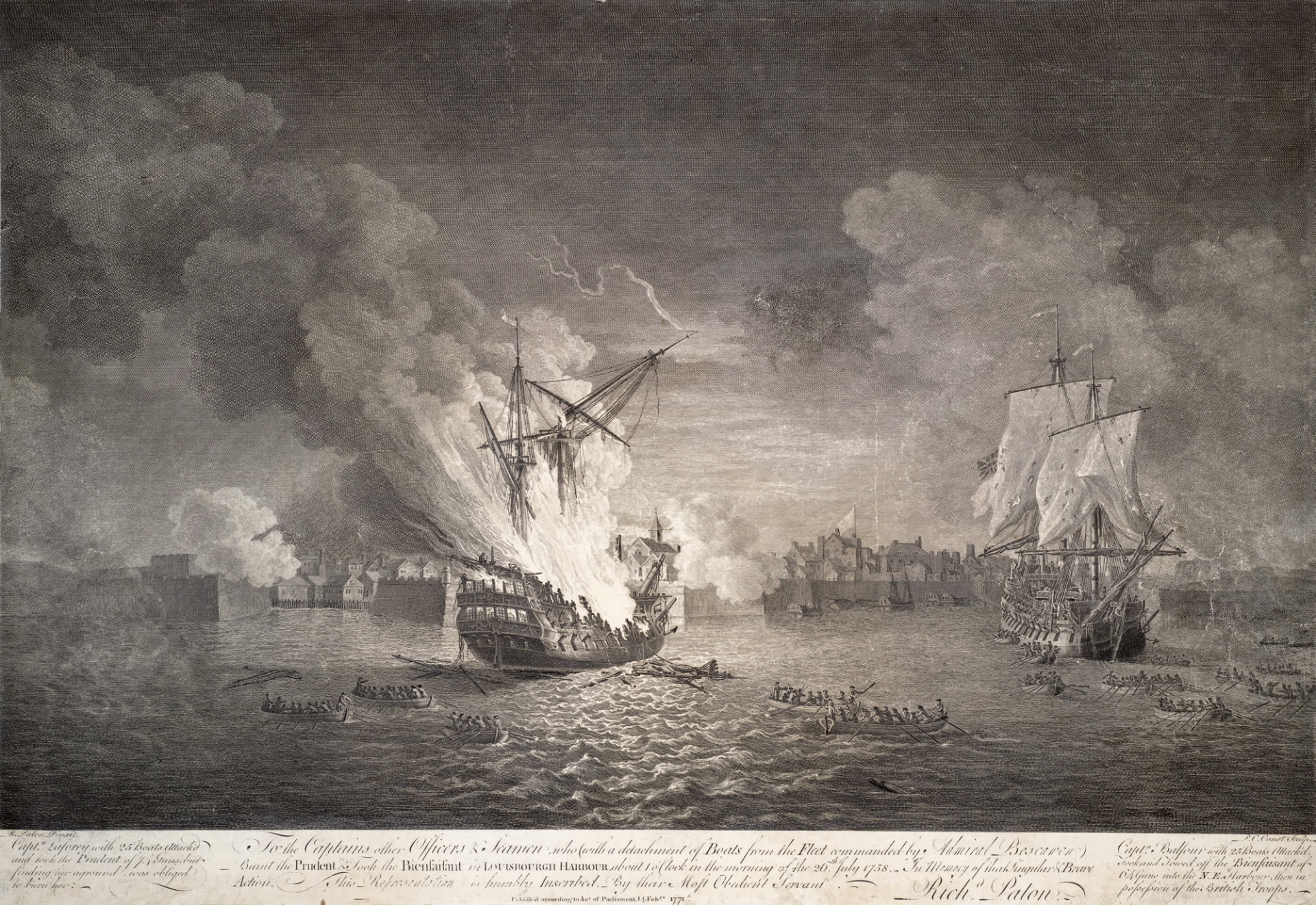
- 1771 engraving of the Siege of Louisborg in which Prudent (first ship from left) can be seen burning.

History

France
- Name: Prudent
- Operator: Royal French Navy
- Builder: Rochefort
- Laid down: 1751
- Launched: July 1753
- Commissioned: October 1754
- Fate: Scuttled in 1758, salvaged and scrapped in 1761

General characteristics
- Type: Third Rate Ship of the line
- Displacement: 2790 tonneaux
- Tons burthen: 1500 port tonneaux
- Decks: 3
- Complement: 656
- Armament: 74 cannon

Prudent was a 74-gun ship of the line of the French Navy. Built in the Rochefort Arsenal in 1753, she entered service during the opening year of the French and Indian War. During the 1758 siege of Louisbourg she was one of a fleet of 11 French ships trapped in Louisbourg by a superior Royal Navy force; during the final night of the siege, she was boarded by British sailors and set on fire, resulting in her loss.
