= John Henry Bastide =

British military engineer

Lieutenant-General John Henry Bastide
- Born: c. 1700
- Died: September 1770 (aged c. 70)
- Children: 3 sons and 2 daughters
- Military career
- Allegiance: Great Britain
- Service years: 1711–1770
- Conflicts: War of the Quadruple Alliance; Battle of Glen Shiel; King George's War; Siege of Louisbourg; Seven Years' War; Siege of Louisbourg

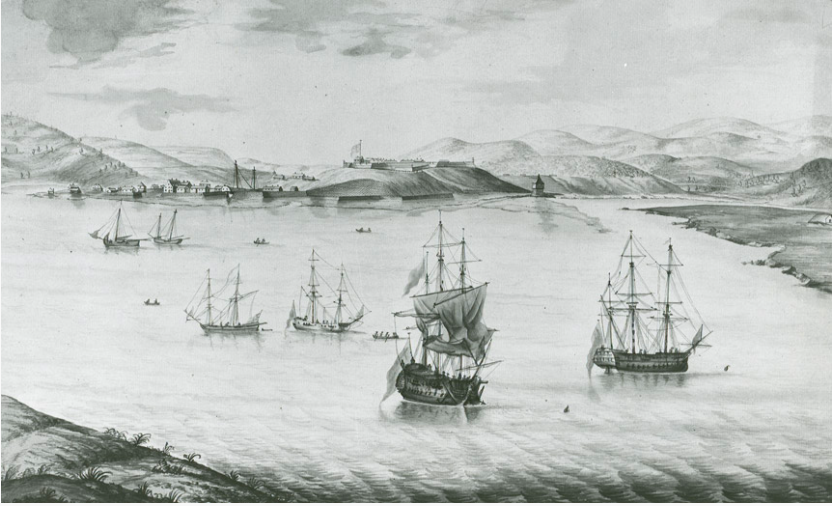
Annapolis Royal by military engineer John Henry Bastide, 1751, Nova Scotia Archives

Lieutenant-General John Henry Bastide (c. 1700 – September 1770) was a British army officer and military engineer who played a significant role in the early history of Nova Scotia. He was the chief engineer at both of the sieges of Louisbourg (1745 and 1758) and the siege of Minorca (1756).

== Early life and career ==
Bastide was born around 1700, the son of a French military officer, Colonel Armand de la Bastide, a Huguenot born in Bern, Switzerland, the son of Colonel John de la Bastide. After Armand became a naturalised British citizen in 1691, he was given command of Count Nassau's Regiment. Later he was appointed as Governor of the Isle of Wight. He died in 1744. Armand is Sir Derek Jacobi's seven times great uncle on his mother's side.

John Bastide joined the British Army as a boy; a notation in the Army List describes him as a ‘child’. His first commission, dated 23 August 1711, was as an ensign in Hill's Regiment. He purchased his promotion to lieutenant in the same regiment on 25 February 1718. Between 1718 and 1720, Bastide was in Scotland, where he created several dated maps, plans and sketches. On 10 June 1719, Bastide and his regiment were at the Battle of Glen Shiel. He drew a detailed plan of the battlefield and the movements of the opposing forces.

It is not certain when Bastide became an engineer but he was certainly one by 1726. From that date to 1739, he directed "the works and fortifications at Jersey and Guernsey." The first record of Bastide found in the records of the Corps of Engineers (now Royal Engineers) is his appointment as sub-engineer on 14 February 1733.

At that time, engineer officers were not part of the British Army as such but, along with the artillery, were part of the Ordnance Corps, under the command of the Master General of the Ordnance. It was, however, quite normal for engineers to also hold rank within an army regiment. Regimental commissions were purchased but appointments within the corps of engineers were by seniority and could not be purchased.

In 1740, Bastide went to North America as chief engineer at Annapolis Royal, then the chief town of Nova Scotia. It had responsibilities for defences and fortifications throughout Nova Scotia and New England. In 1742, he visited Canso to lay plans for refortification. The plans were never implemented but Bastide left a detailed plan of the harbour and the community. On 13 May 1743, Bastide sent a letter addressed to "My Lord Duke." Describing himself as the second lieutenant in General Cornwallis's regiment, he stated that he had received advice that he was to be exchanged from his regiment to one in Nova Scotia. He did not wish to be transferred and begged leave to resign his lieutenancy to his son or permission to sell it in order to provide some security for his family. He continued in his engineer duties, being promoted to Engineer Extraordinary on 3 July 1742, Engineer in Ordinary on 8 March 1744, and Sub-Director sometime later in 1744.

== War of the Austrian Succession ==
=== First Siege of Louisbourg ===
Prior to France's declaration of war (War of the Austrian Succession) against Great Britain (15 March 1744), Bastide inspected and reported upon the necessary measures to improve the defences of Fort William and Mary at New Castle, New Hampshire. In 1743 and 1744, he assisted in the construction of fortifications at Castle William in Boston harbour, Marblehead, Cape Ann, and Falmouth in Casco Bay, for which in April 1745, Massachusetts granted him £140 for his services. As war became imminent, Bastide returned to Annapolis Royal to bolster its defences. With time and resources at a premium, Bastide abandoned plans to erect new fortifications and concentrating on putting "the old ones into the best repair they are capable of."

In May 1744, before many of the English settlers in Nova Scotia had heard of the declaration of war, French forces from Louisbourg, Nova Scotia, attacked and captured Canso. The New Englanders feared for their safety and under the leadership of Governor William Shirley of Massachusetts, a plan was prepared for the attack and capture of Louisbourg. Bastide, who had gained considerable knowledge of Louisbourg, was intimately involved in the planning and preparation during 1744 and early 1745, but by the time the expedition, under the command of William Pepperrell, was launched in April 1745, Bastide was back in Annapolis Royal. It was besieged by a force of about 300 French colonials and Indians led by Paul and Joseph Marin. However, the fortress, helped by Bastide's recent improvements to the defences, held out. On 24 May the French, hearing that Louisbourg was under siege, withdrew.

The Louisburg expedition landed in Gabarus Bay on 1 May 1745 and siege works commenced at once (Siege of Louisbourg (1745). There being no professional British military engineers with the expedition, Pepperell wrote to Bastide at Annapolis, asking for help as quickly as possible. On 27 May, Bastide sailed to Louisbourg, arriving on 5 June. From that date to the surrender of the fort on the 17th of the month, "Bastide conducted the operations with spirit and efficiency which elicited the warmest approval of Pepperell and Commodore Warren.". His valuable services in preparing the plans and the means for the capture of Louisburg in 1745 were also acknowledged by Governor Shirley of Massachusetts in a message to the House of Representatives. However, Pepperrell later expressed serious reservations concerning Bastide's engineering abilities, describing him to the Duke of Newcastle in November as not "equal to the care of the Works of this important Fortress."

For his conduct during this siege, Bastide was given a company in Shirley's American Provincials (67th Foot), which garrisoned Louisbourg from 1746 to 1749, with the rank of captain (1 September 1745). He was also warranted on 16 October as Chief Engineer of Louisburg. On 2 January 1749, Bastide was appointed a director in the Corps of Engineers. Later that year when, in accordance with the Treaty of Aix-la-Chapelle (1748), Louisbourg was returned to the French crown, Bastide returned to Annapolis Royal to become once again its chief engineer. In this post in 1750 he was receiving "20s/ a day as Director, 20s/ as Chief at Annapolis, and 10s/ in lieu of a clerk."

== 7 Years War ==
=== Minorca ===
By 6 December 1755, Bastide was the Director of Engineers at Minorca. At the start of the Seven Years’ War on 17 April 1756, the British sighted the French fleet off the Minorcan coast and, within a few days Fort St Philip, the main British garrison, was under siege. The fortress was well-designed and strengthened by countless mines and galleries hewn out of the solid rock, which afforded unusual protection to the defenders.

However, over the years a small town had been allowed to develop within cannon-shot of the fort's defences. This area, known as St Philips Town, lay across both the roads from the fort to the town of Mahon. Bastide was subject to later criticism that he "neglected to destroy those houses in the town which would afford cover to the besiegers.". Although only in his late fifties, he was also considered by at least one commentator as "too old for his post, and crippled with gout".

Despite the defeat of Admiral John Byng’s relief force at the Battle of Minorca, the British garrison held on until crumbling walls and the exhaustion of the defenders caused Blakeney to capitulate with the honours of war. Under the terms of the treaty, Bastide and the other survivors of the garrison were transported back to England. On 14 May 1757, all engineers on the establishment were given military commissions, and Bastide duly became a lieutenant-colonel.

=== Second Siege of Louisbourg ===
Back in England, Bastide was kept employed on various tasks and appears to have been known at high levels, as is evidenced by the reference in an Admiralty paper of 19 September 1757, " Mr Pitt, Principal Secretary of State, has informed the Admiralty that the Master General of Ordnance says that Lieutenant Colonel Bastide reports that a floating battery made of an old gunship will help to secure Milford Haven.....". In 1757, William Pitt decided on the capture of Louisbourg as a high priority. In a Council of war called by Lord Loudoun at Halifax, to decide on the advisability of attacking Louisbourg or Quebec, a paper from Bastide was read and considered by the members of the council.

In early 1758, Bastide was appointed chief engineer of the expedition to capture Louisbourg, this event possibly coinciding with his promotion to colonel on 9 January. He had Major Patrick MacKellar as his deputy and a further 8 engineer officers under his command. On arrival in Halifax in early May, Bastide prepared six blockhouses of squared timber with the timbers marked so that they could be erected within a few hours upon arrival at Louisbourg. These were designed to have an upper platform with musket-proof parapets on which small cannon could be mounted and were intended as "end rideouts for the protection of the camp".

The expedition set sail from Halifax on 29 May 1758 under the command of Major-General Jeffery Amherst, arriving off Gabarus Bay on 2 June. Due to bad weather a landing was not made until 8 June. In Amherst's post-expedition report to William Pitt he states, "The 17th I got Colonel Bastide on Horseback, and, with Colonel Williamson and Major M'Kellar, we reconnoitred the whole Ground as far as we could and Colonel Bastide was determined in his Opinion of making Approaches by the Green Hill, and confining the Destruction of the Ships in the Harbour, to the Light-House Point, and the Batteries on that Side", and, "On the 24th the Enemy fired on the Light-House Batteries from the Town and Shipping, and on our advanced Redoute, which was finished, they fired from the Town. Colonel Bastide remained fixed in his Opinion of advancing by Green-Hill." Bastide would appear to have been taking the cautious, conventional approach and a study of the ground would indicate that any other approach was fraught with difficulties and Bastide, with his great experience of Louisbourg, must have been the best person to understand this. At a later stage General Wolfe made serious charges concerning "the ignorance and inexperience of the Engineers," asserting "It is impossible to conceive how poorly the engineering business was carried on here.". It was, however, the route via Green Hill that continued to be followed and via which the fortress was finally battered into submission.

On 8 July, "Col Bastide got a Contusion by a Musket Ball on his Boot which lay him up in the Gout.". Mackellar took over as chief engineer although by 24 July Bastide was well enough to be on a horse and about his duties again. On 27 July, the French surrendered, after which Bastide returned to England. In February 1759, the British government decided that the fortress of Louisbourg was to be razed. Bastide was put in charge of the demolitions and he arrived back in Louisbourg on 24 May 1760 with a company of miners specially raised in England for the purpose. Having destroyed the fortress and left only piles of rubble, Bastide reported to Amherst on 28 November 1760 that "the demolition of its fortifications and harbour defences had been completed." He left Louisbourg on 15 Jan 1761.

=== Burying the Hatchet Ceremony ===
On 4 August 1759, Bastide was appointed Captain Lieutenant in the 24th Regiment of Foot and on 22 February 1761, he was promoted to major-general in the Army. On 25 June 1761, he participated in the Burying the Hatchet ceremony that was held at Governor Jonathan Belcher’s garden on present-day Spring Garden, Halifax in front of the Court House. The ceremony ended seventy years of warfare between the Mi'kmaq and the British.

At about the same time, he received orders to supervise the construction of the fortifications at Halifax where he remained until July 1762. With the Spanish Empire having entered the war on the side of France, there was concern that Halifax would be attacked. Bastide played a prominent role in the construction of the Halifax Citadel and the defences to Halifax Harbour, the result being a system of rough field works made of earth and sod.

Bastide returned to England in October 1762. He was promoted lieutenant-general on 30 April 1770. He died in September 1770 and his will was proved at the Prerogative Court ofI no Canterbury on 26 September 1770, his parish and county being stated as Southampton, Hampshire. A memorial of 1766 says that he had three sons and two daughters.
