= Île-Royale =

1713–1763 French colony in North America

- 1713–1763
- Top: Flag (1663—1715); Bottom: Flag under the House of Bourbon (1534—1689) (Note: The Royal Banner of early modern France or "Bourbon Flag" was the most commonly used flag in New France) Coat of arms of New France (Note: Lesser version of the coat of arms as used by the French Government.)
- Motto: "Montjoie Saint Denis!" (French); "Mountjoy Saint Denis!"
- Map of the colony.
- Status: Colony of France within New France (1535–1758); Under British military occupation (1758–1763)
- Capital: Louisbourg
- Official languages: French
- Religion: Catholicism
- Government: Monarchy
- King of France
  - 1534–1547: Francis I (first)
  - 1715–1763: Louis XV (last)
- Viceroy of New France
  - 1534–1541: Jacques Cartier (first; as Governor of New France)
  - 1755–1760: Pierre de Rigaud de Vaudreuil (last)
- History
  - Established: 1713
  - Disestablished: 1763
- Currency: Livre tournois
- Today part of: Canada (Îles de la Madeleine, Prince Edward Island and Nova Scotia)

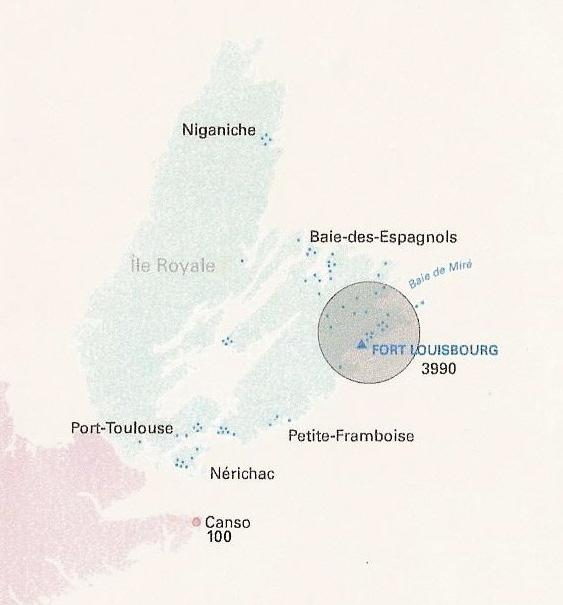
Louisbourg on Ïle Royale in 1750

Île-Royale (French pronunciation: [il ʁwajal], lit. 'Royal Island') was a French colony in North America that existed from 1713 to 1763 as part of the wider colony of Acadia.

It consisted of two main islands, Île Royale (present-day Cape Breton Island, Nova Scotia), Île Saint-Jean (present-day Prince Edward Island) and the Magdalen Islands archipelago. It was ceded to the British Empire after the Seven Years' War, and is today part of Canada.

== Context ==
The 1713 Treaties of Utrecht, which brought an end to the War of the Spanish Succession, broke the equilibrium that existed in North America between Great Britain and France. The treaties marked the start of the reduction of French royal authority in this region of the world. Article 13 of the Treaties of Utrecht reads: "The Island called Cape Breton and all the others located in the Gulf of Saint Lawrence, will as of this date belong to France...".

France recognized the rights of Great Britain on the Hudson Bay region and also ceded continental Acadia, Newfoundland and Saint Pierre and Miquelon to Great Britain. In now-British Newfoundland, the French kept their fishing rights and some rights to use parts of the land along the coast to work. Mostly, French settlers from those ceded lands relocated to the maritime islands that were established as France-owned.

The territory of modern New Brunswick was a source of contention between Great Britain and France for 50 additional years, which was only to be resolved by the Treaty of Paris in 1763 with the surrender of French.

=== Re-settlement ===
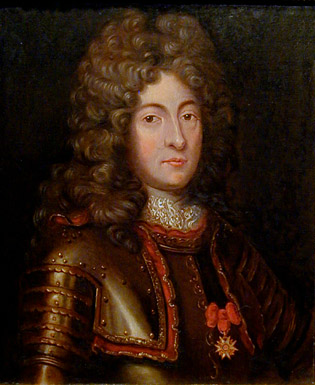
Philippe de Pastour de Costebelle, 1st Governor of Île-Royale

Philippe de Pastour de Costebelle, regional French colonial governor and naval officer, persuaded the Acadian inhabitants of Plaisance and Saint Pierre and Miquelon to move to Île-Royale. In 1714, they came to inspect the land and certain families, such as the Costes and the Tillards, decided to establish themselves while others only passed through before settling on Île Saint-Jean. The majority established themselves at St. Peters (renamed Port Toulouse) and situated on the eastern coast of Île-Royale, recreating the Acadian colony. French ships came regularly to fish cod.

Partisan map of Acadia in 1754.

== Louisbourg ==
Strategically located, Louisbourg was founded in 1713 and used as a fishing port for cod. It had a readily defensible harbour and served peacefully for three decades as a seaport for the French colony. A fortress was constructed starting in 1719 to protect French interests in North America and to serve the seasonal fishing industry. Its geographic position permitted Louisbourg to serve, not only as capital of Île-Royale, but as first line of defence in the 18th century during a series of wars with Great Britain for the supremacy of North America.

During the War of the Austrian Succession, New England colonial troops aided by the British Royal Marines attacked the city, capturing it in 1745 after six weeks of siege. Despite its capture and then three years of British governance, Louisbourg was returned to France in the Treaty of Aix-la-Chapelle, in exchange for Madras, India, which the French had captured in the war. With Louisbourg's return, the French Minister of Marine appointed Charles des Herbiers de La Ralière as governor in 1748, and Jean-Louis de Raymond in 1751, who was replaced in 1754 by Augustin de Boschenry de Drucour.

== End of French rule ==
Peace was short lived, and on 26 July 1758, after the second Siege of Louisbourg led by British officers Edward Boscawen and James Wolfe, the French Governor Augustin de Drucourt gave the keys of the city to the British.

Following the transfer, 4,000 Acadian inhabitants were deported. A group of ten families from Port Toulouse fled to Isle Madame where their descendants still live today.

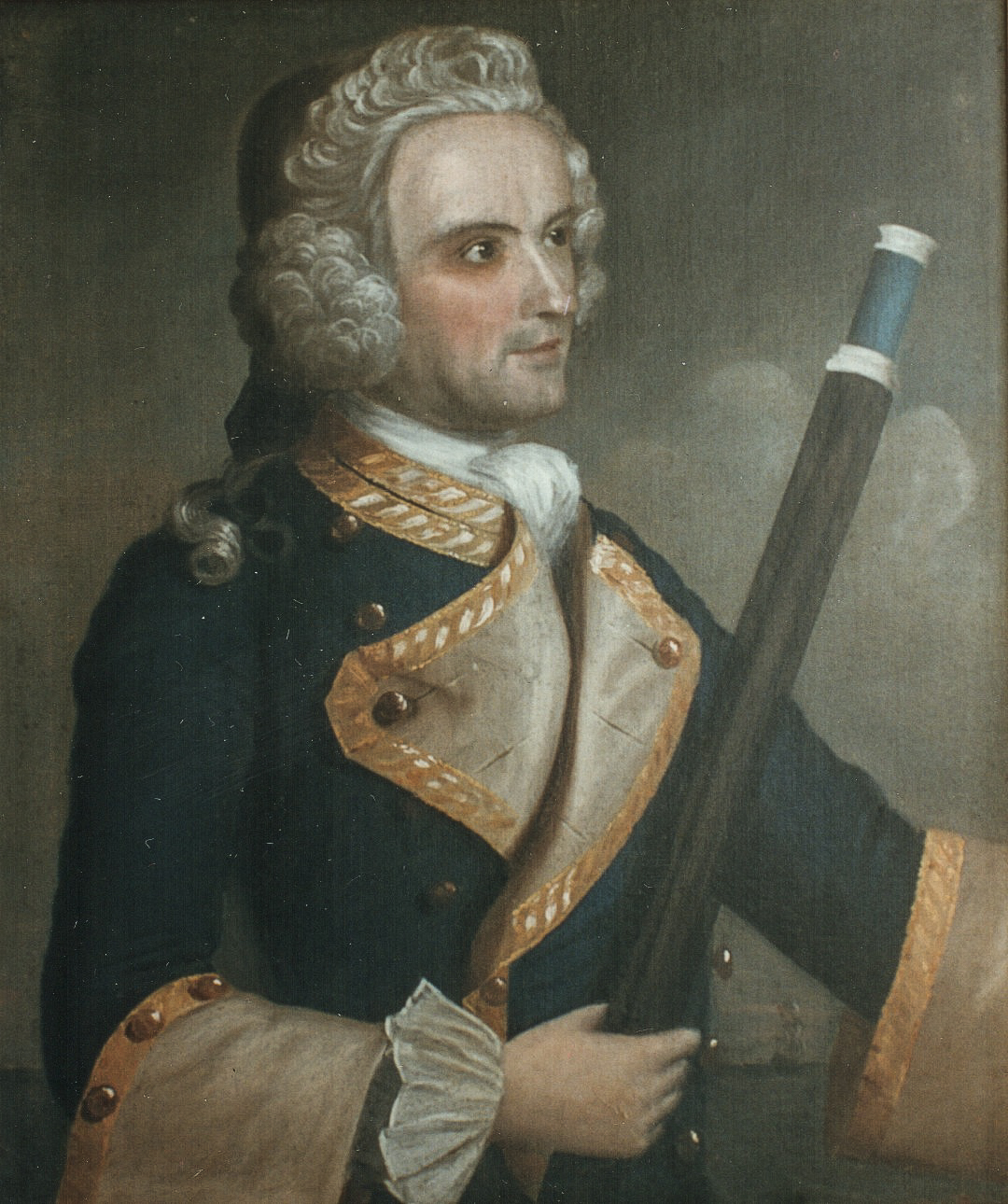
Portrait of Commodore Charles Knowles when Governor of Louisburg, hangs in Portsmouth Athenæum

=== Governors ===
- Philippe Pastour de Costebelle (1714–1717)
- Joseph de Monbeton de Brouillan, dit Saint-Ovide (1717–1739)
- Isaac-Louis de Forant (1739–1740)
- Jean-Baptiste Prévost du Quesnel (1740–1744)
- Louis Du Pont Duchambon de Vergor (1744–1745)
- Antoine Le Moyne de Châteauguay (1745)
- British occupation 1745-48 (returned by treaty):
  - Charles Knowles (1745–1747)
  - Peregrine Thomas Hopson (1747–1748)
- Charles des Herbiers de La Ralière (1748–1751)
- Jean-Louis de Raymond (1751–1753)
- Augustin de Boschenry de Drucour (1754–1758)
