= Michael Dauncey =

British Army officer

- Born: 11 May 1920; Coventry, West Midlands, England
- Died: 23 August 2017 (aged 97)
- Military career
- Allegiance: United Kingdom
- Branch: British Army
- Service years: 1941–1985
- Rank: Brigadier
- Service number: 184738
- Units: Cheshire Regiment; Glider Pilot Regiment
- Commands: 126th Infantry Brigade; 1st Battalion, Cheshire Regiment
- Conflicts: World War II
- Awards: Distinguished Service Order

Brigadier Michael Donald Keen Dauncey, DSO, DL (9 May 1920 – 23 August 2017) was a British Army officer who participated in Operation Market Garden during the Second World War.

== Military career ==
Michael Donald Keen Dauncy was born in Coventry in the West Midlands on 11 May 1920, the only son of Thomas Gough Dauncey and his wife, Alice Keen. He was educated at King Edward's School, Birmingham.

=== Market Garden ===
On the first day of the operation, 17 September 1944, Dauncey flew a Horsa glider into Arnhem. Several days of fighting ensued, during which he sustained eye injuries. Despite being blinded in one eye, he fought on, but was taken prisoner. With another officer he escaped from a Dutch hospital on a rope of knotted sheets and hid in the Utrecht English Parsonage for four months. He was later awarded the Distinguished Service Order for bravery shown during this battle.

== Later life ==
After a number of appointments he was made Colonel of the Cheshire Regiment in 1978.

In retirement he lived in Uley, Gloucestershire, with his wife Marjorie (née Neep). He died on 23 August 2017 aged 97.
