= Es Castell =

- Municipality
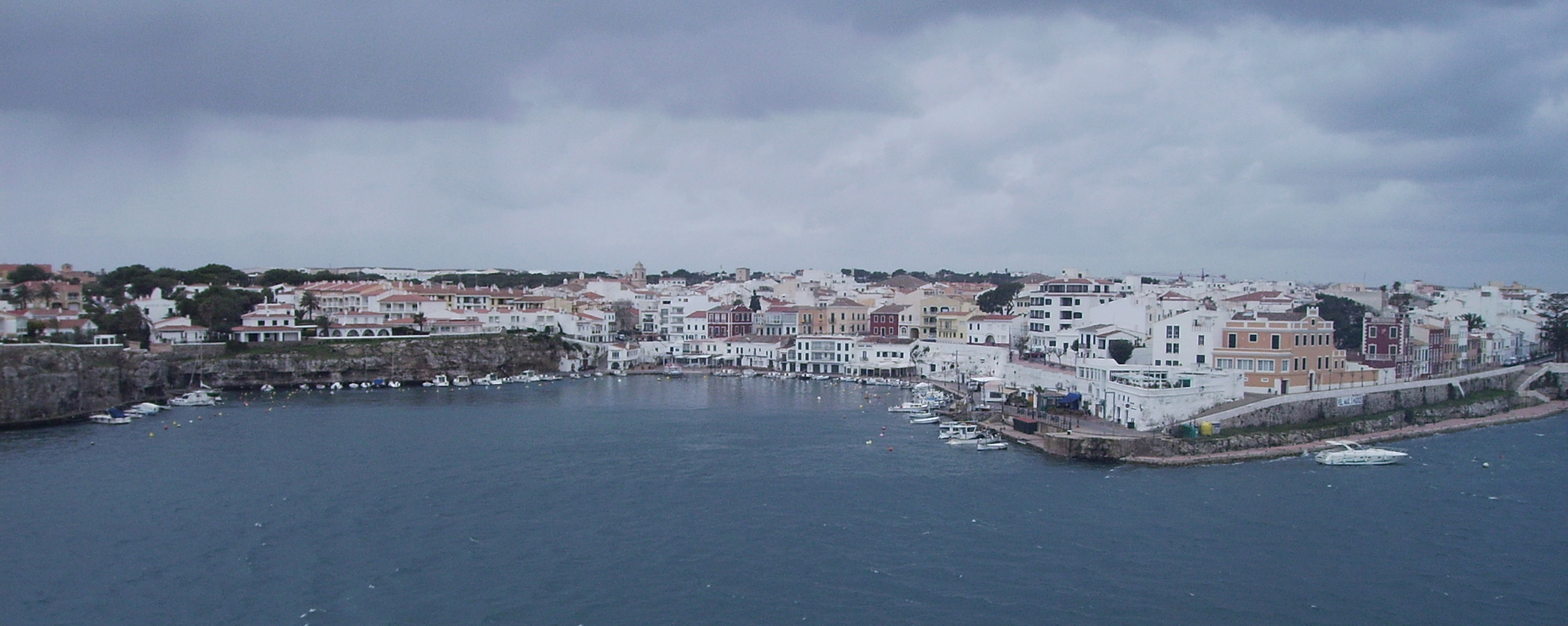
- Cales Fonts

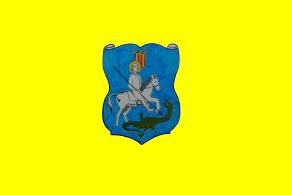
- Flag Coat of arms

- Location of Es Castell in Menorca

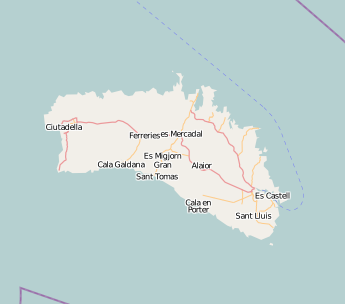
- Location in Menorca Es Castell (Balearic Islands) Es Castell (Spain)
- Coordinates: 39°52′49″N 4°17′27″E
- Country: Spain
- Autonomous Community: Balearic Islands
- Province: Balearic Islands
- Island: Menorca

Government
  - Mayor: Joana Escandell Salom (PP)

Area
  - Total: 11.6 km^{2} (4.5 sq mi)

Population (2025-01-01)
  - Total: 7,774
  - Density: 670/km^{2} (1,740/sq mi)
- Time zone: UTC+1 (CET)
  - Summer (DST): UTC+2 (CEST (GMT +2))
- Postal code: 07720
- Area code: +34 (Spain) + 971 (Baleares)
- Website: Town Hall

Es Castell (Balearic Catalan: [əs kəsˈteʎ]) is a small municipality in eastern Menorca in the Balearic Islands, Spain. The town was founded in 1771 by British Col. Patrick Mackellar and was originally called Georgetown in honour of King George III; however, it takes its current name from the large fort nearby, known to the British as St. Philip's Castle. Col. Patrick MacKellar (Argyllshire 1717-1778) was the chief engineer of Menorca and his house today is known as Son Granot. Es Castell celebrates its Foundation Day on 1 June with 18th-century themed festivities, in which the Municipality itself, St. Philip's Castle Foundation, Son Granot and other institutions participate.

== Gallery ==
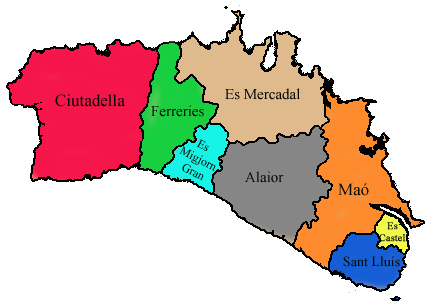
Municipalities of Menorca

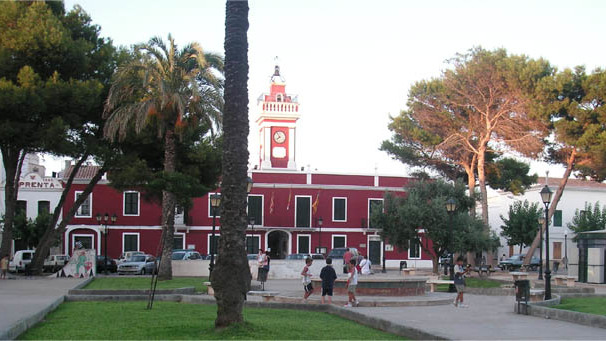
Es Castell town hall

Son Granot

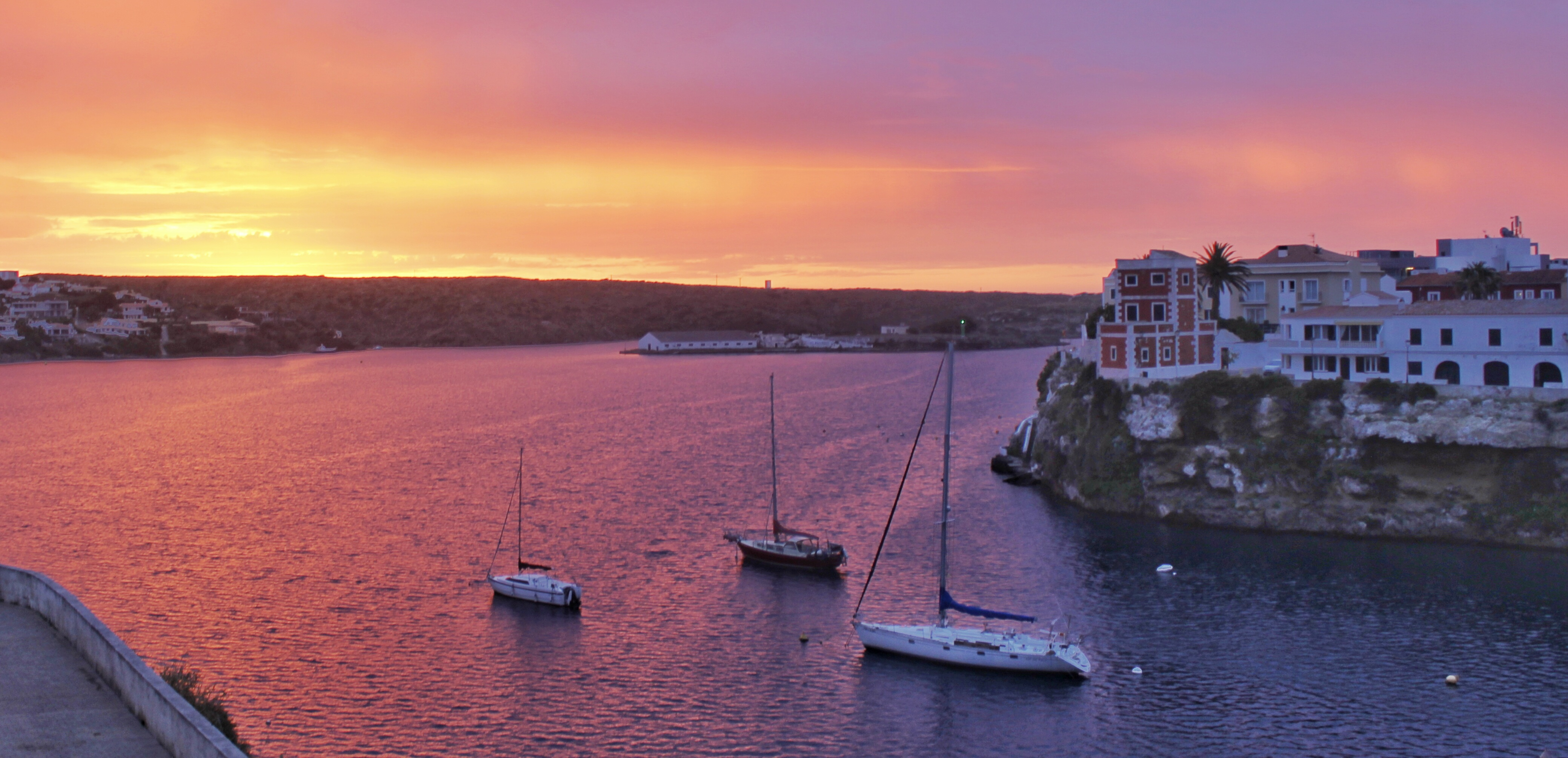
Sunrise at Cala Corb

== See also ==
- List of municipalities in Balearic Islands
