= Cheshire Regiment =

Former British Army regiment

22nd Regiment of Foot 22nd (Cheshire) Regiment of Foot Cheshire Regiment
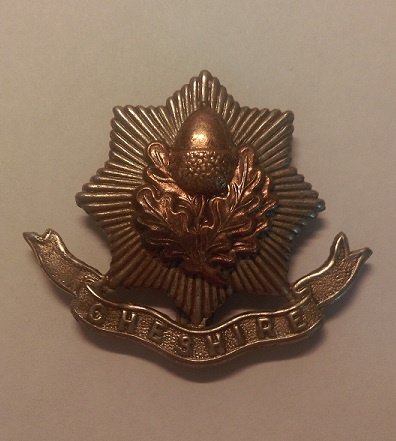
- Cap badge of the Cheshire Regiment
- Active: 1689–2007
- Allegiance: Kingdom of England (to 1707) Kingdom of Great Britain (1707–1800) United Kingdom (1801–2007)
- Branch: British Army
- Type: Infantry
- Role: Line infantry
- Size: One battalion
- Part of: Prince of Wales' Division
- Garrison/HQ: Chester Castle (1873–1939); Dale Barracks, Upton-by-Chester (1939–2007)
- Nicknames: The Old Two-twos; The Young Buffs; The Peep of Day Boys; The Lightning Conductors; The Red Knights; The Specimens; Twos
- Colors: Cerise and Buff
- March: Quick – Wha Wadna Fecht for Charlie; Slow – The 22nd Regiment 1772
- Engagements: See honours list

Commanders
- Last Colonel-in-Chief: Prince Charles, The Prince of Wales
- Colonel of the Regiment: Brigadier A.R.D. Sharpe

Insignia
- Tactical Recognition Flash

The Cheshire Regiment was a line infantry regiment of the British Army, part of the Prince of Wales' Division. The 22nd Regiment of Foot was raised by the Henry Howard, 7th Duke of Norfolk in 1689 and was able to boast an independent existence of over 300 years. The regiment was expanded in 1881 as part of the Childers Reforms by the linking of the 22nd (Cheshire) Regiment of Foot and the militia and rifle volunteers of Cheshire. The title 22nd (Cheshire) Regiment continued to be used within the regiment.

On 1 September 2007, the Cheshire Regiment was merged with the Worcestershire and Sherwood Foresters Regiment (29th/45th Foot) and the Staffordshire Regiment (Prince of Wales's) to form a new large regiment, the Mercian Regiment, becoming the 1st Battalion, Mercian Regiment.

== History ==
=== Early wars ===
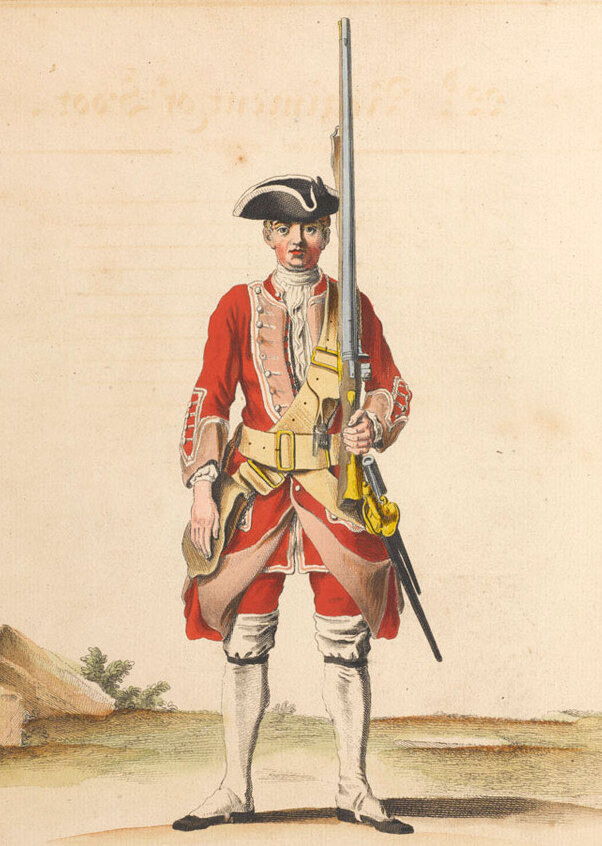
c. 1742 engraving of a regimental private

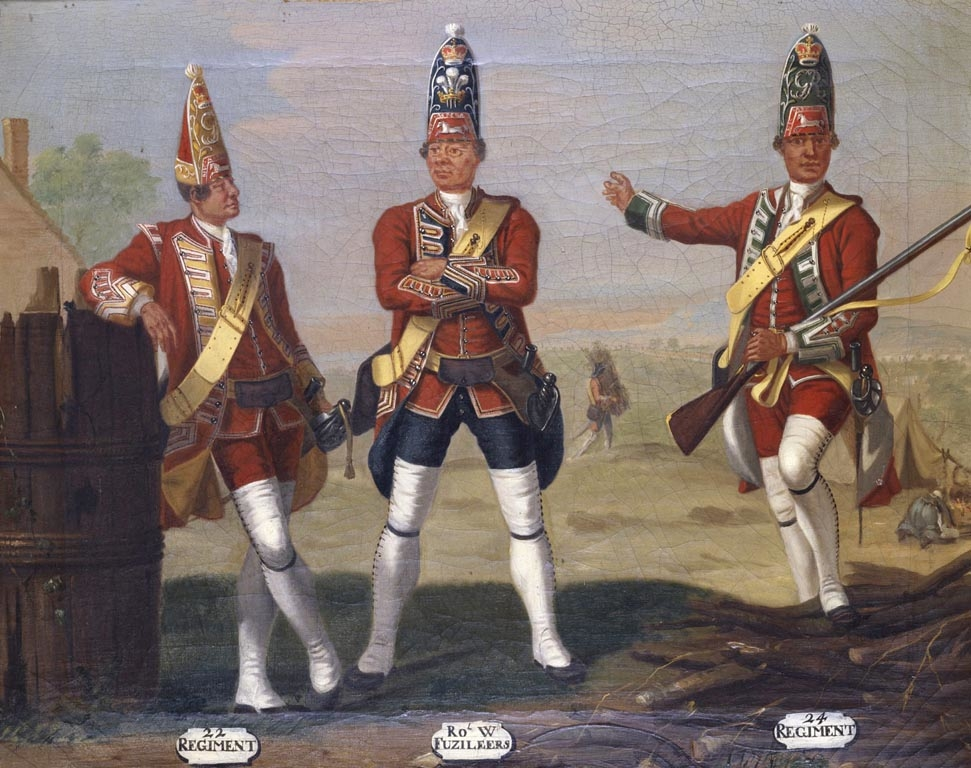
c. 1751 painting of a regimental grenadier (left)

Following the 1688 Glorious Revolution and the exile of James II, Henry Howard, Duke of Norfolk, raised a regiment at Chester on behalf of the new regime.

The experience of the 1638-1652 Wars of the Three Kingdoms meant many considered standing armies a danger to individual liberties and a threat to society itself. Until the mid-18th century, regiments were considered the property of their Colonel, changed names when transferred and were disbanded as soon as possible.

In September 1689, Sir Henry Belasyse became Colonel and as Belasyse's Regiment of Foot, the unit went to Ireland as part of an Anglo-Dutch force commanded by Frederick Schomberg. When inspected at Dundalk in October 1689, it was reported as having '...hardly any good officers and an entire absence of good order...but Belasyse expected to work reforms.'

During the 1689-1691 Williamite War in Ireland, it fought at The Boyne, Aughrim, and the Second Siege of Limerick that ended the war in August 1691. The regiment was transferred to Flanders in October, where it spent the rest of the Nine Years War, fighting at the Battle of Landen in 1693 and during the 1695 Allied siege of Namur.

After the 1697 Treaty of Ryswick, the Tory majority in Parliament was determined to reduce costs and by 1699, the English military was less than 7,000 men. However, England, Ireland and Scotland were then separate entities with their own Parliaments and funding; Belasyse's Regiment of Foot avoided disbandment by being transferred onto the Irish military establishment.

On the outbreak of the War of the Spanish Succession in 1701, the regiment was posted to Jamaica; this was a notoriously unhealthy location and Sir Henry Belasyse transferred his Colonelcy to William Selwyn. The regiment spent the next twelve years in the West Indies; soon after arrival in April 1702, Selwyn died and was replaced by Thomas Handasyd, both as Colonel and Governor of Jamaica. Thomas returned to England and was succeeded as Colonel by his son Roger Handasyd in 1712, a position he retained until 1730.

In 1726, the regiment was posted to Menorca, where it remained for the next 22 years, although a detachment was present at the Battle of Dettingen in June 1743, during the War of the Austrian Succession.

By 1751, the regiment had become the 22nd Regiment of Foot. In 1758, it took part in the Siege of Louisbourg in French Canada. The regiment also took part in General Wolfe's victory over the French at the Battle of the Plains of Abraham in September 1759. They then took part in the conclusive three pronged attack against Montréal which capitulated in September 1760.

The regiment received two battle honours for taking part in the capture of Martinique and the British expedition against Cuba during 1762.

=== American Revolutionary War ===
The regiment was sent to North America for service in the American Revolutionary War in 1775. Lieutenant Colonel James Abercrombie, commanding the regiment, embarked in advance of the rest of the regiment at the request of General Thomas Gage and arrived in Boston just before the Battle of Bunker Hill, where he was killed in action. The regiment later evacuated from Boston to Halifax and then took part in the New York and New Jersey campaign of 1776. The Battalion Companies participated in the Battle of Rhode Island in August 1778 and then returned to New York City in 1779; the bulk of the regiment remained there until the end of the War.

Although the County designation existed unofficially as early as 1772, the regiment was retitled the 22nd (Cheshire) Regiment of Foot in 1782.

=== French Revolutionary and Napoleonic Wars ===
The regiment deployed to the West Indies in September 1793, where it took part in expeditions against Martinique, Saint Lucia, Guadeloupe, and Saint-Domingue. In January 1800 the regiment was posted to South Africa, before moving to India. There it suffered heavy losses during the assault on Bhurtpore in 1805. In 1810, the regiment took part in the occupation of Mauritius.

=== The Victorian era ===
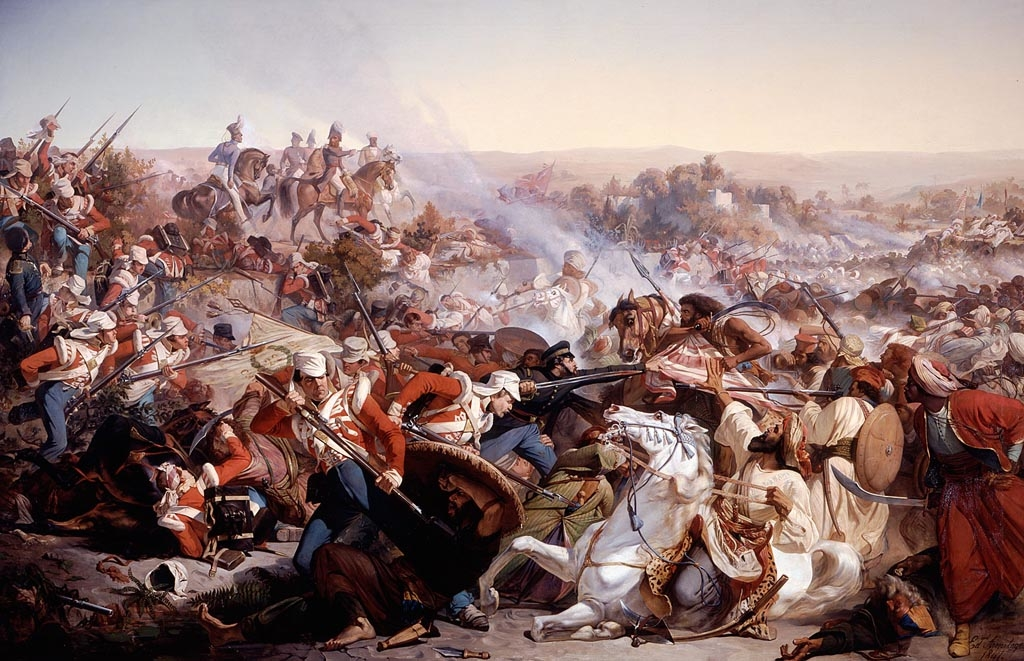
The Battle of Meeanee by Edward Armitage, 1847

The regiment took part in the Battle of Meeanee in February 1843, the Battle of Hyderabad in March 1843 and the conquest of Sindh in summer 1843 during further Indian service.

The regiment was not fundamentally affected by the Cardwell Reforms of the 1870s, which gave it a depot at Chester Castle from 1873, or by the Childers reforms of 1881 – as it already possessed two battalions, there was no need for it to amalgamate with another regiment. Under the reforms the regiment became The Cheshire Regiment on 1 July 1881. The reforms added the following units: 1st Royal Cheshire Light Infantry Militia, 2nd Royal Cheshire Militia, 1st Cheshire Rifle Volunteer Corps, 2nd (Earl of Chester's) Cheshire RVC, 3rd Cheshire RVC, 4th Cheshire (Cheshire and Derbyshire) RVC, and the 5th Cheshire RVC. Its recruiting area was confirmed as being the County of Cheshire.

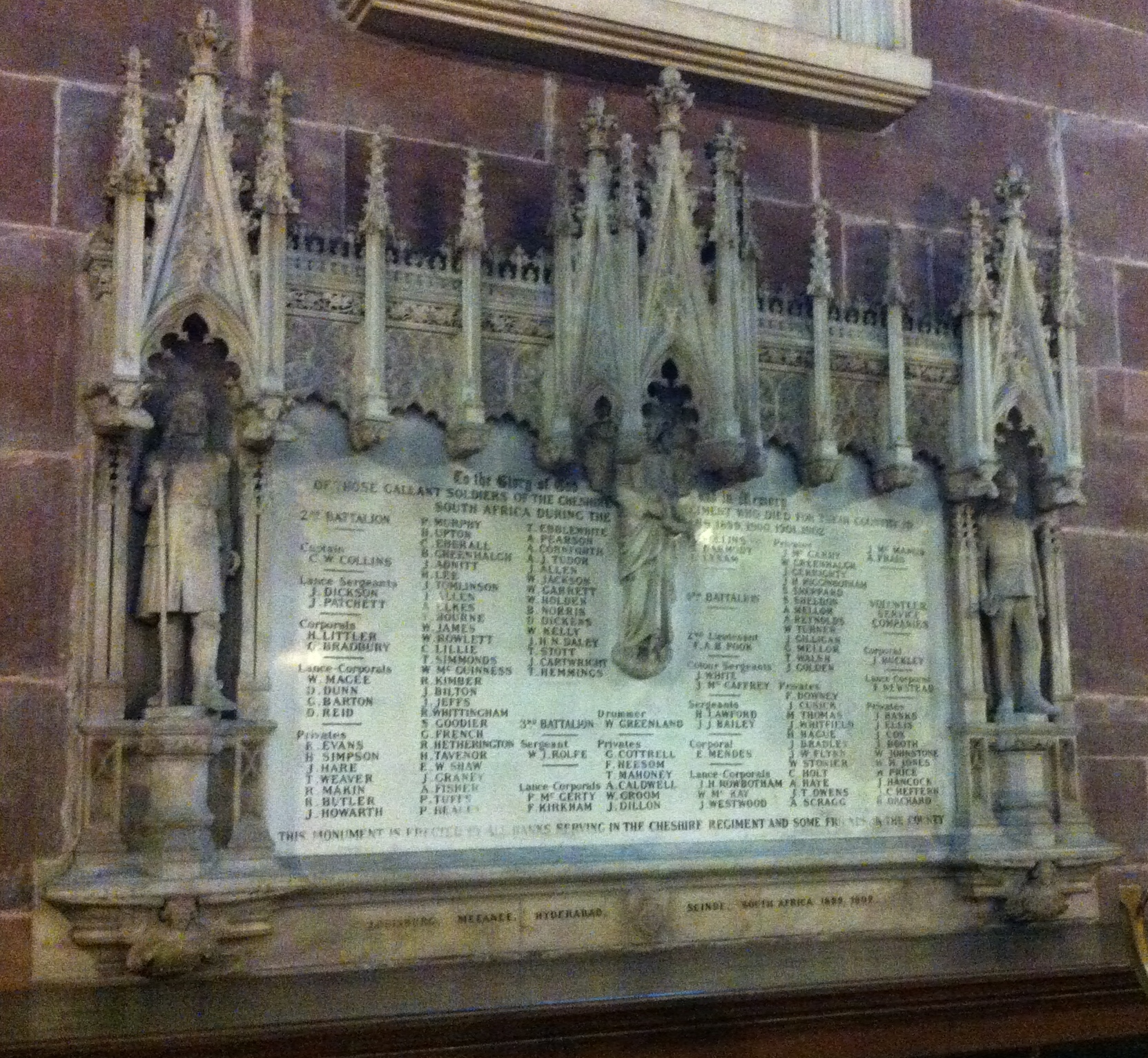
Memorial in Chester Cathedral to the men of the Cheshire Regiment who died in South Africa

Both battalions of the regiment served in Burma between 1887 and 1891, while the 2nd Battalion saw active service in South Africa from 1900 to 1902, during the Second Boer War. After the end of the war, 376 officers and men of the battalion returned home in October 1902, and were stationed at Aldershot. The 3rd (Militia) battalion was also embodied for active duty in South Africa, with 450 men reported as returning home after the end of the war in September 1902.

In 1908, the Volunteers and Militia were reorganised nationally, with the former becoming the Territorial Force and the latter the Special Reserve; the regiment now had one Reserve and four Territorial battalions.

=== First World War ===
A British trench near the Albert-Bapaume road at Ovillers-la-Boisselle, July 1916 during the Battle of the Somme. The men are from A Company, 11th (Service) Battalion, Cheshire Regiment.

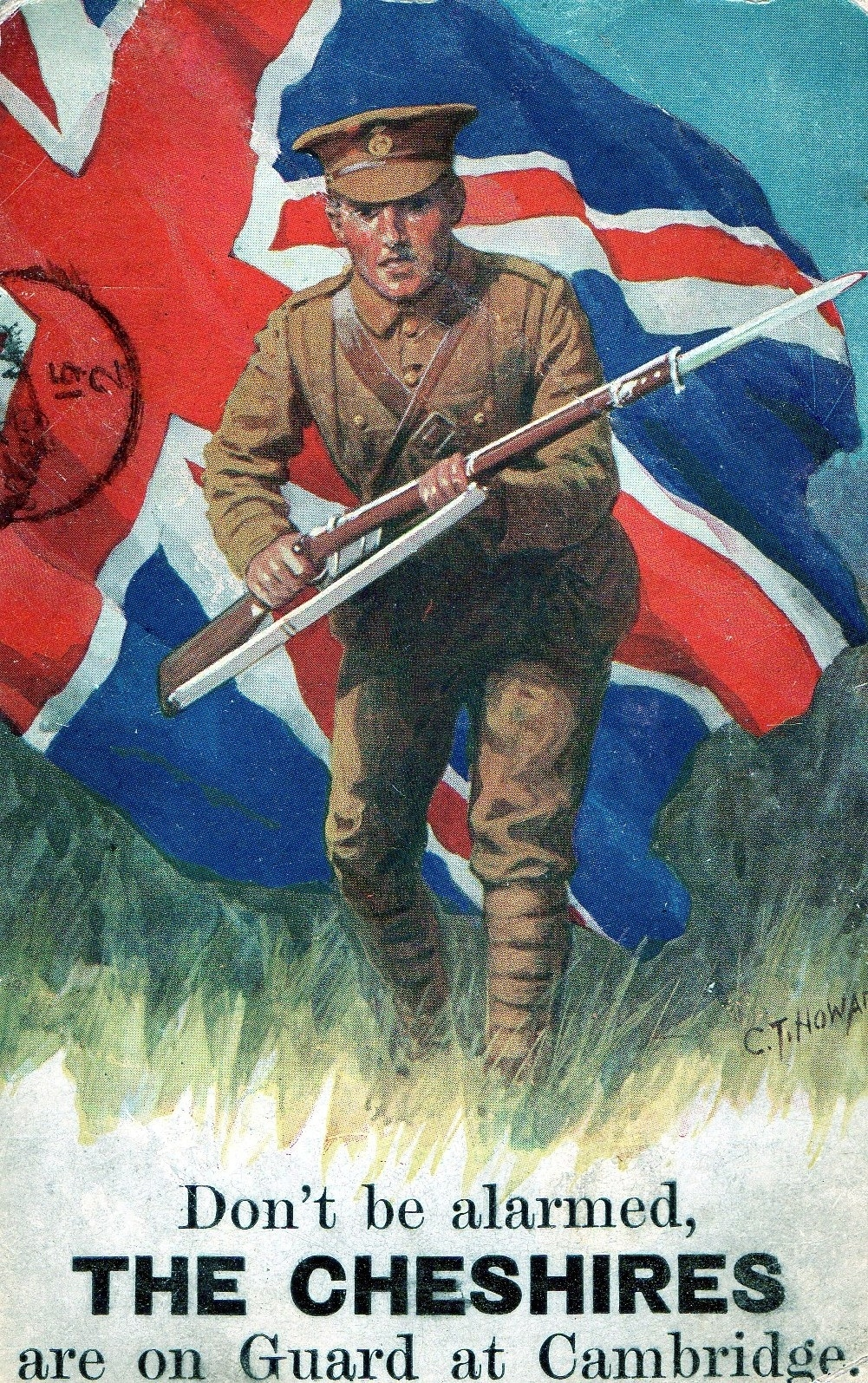
Cheshire Regiment postcard from the First World War.

==== Regular Army ====
The 1st battalion landed at Le Havre as part of the 15th Brigade in the 5th Division in August 1914 for service on the Western Front. It took part in the Battle of Mons in August 1914, the First Battle of the Marne in September 1914, the First Battle of the Aisne also in September 1914, the Battle of La Bassée in October 1914, the Battle of Messines also in October 1914 and in the First Battle of Ypres also in October 1914. It also saw action at the Second Battle of Ypres in April 1915 and the Battle of Hill 60 also in April 1915. In 1917 they fought at the Battle of Arras in April 1917 and the Battle of Passchendaele in July 1917. It then took part in the Battle of the Lys in April 1918 and the Battles of the Hindenburg Line and the Final Advance in Picardy later in the year.

The 2nd battalion, which was recalled from India in December 1914, landed at Le Havre as part of the 84th Brigade in the 28th Division in January 1915 for service on the Western Front; it moved to Egypt in October 1915 and then on to Salonika.

==== Territorial Force ====
The 1/4th Battalion landed in Gallipoli as part of the 159th Brigade in the 53rd (Welsh) Division in August 1915; after being evacuated to Egypt in December 1915 the battalion landed in France in May 1918 for service on the Western Front.

The 1/5th (Earl of Chester's) Battalion landed at Le Havre as part of the 14th Brigade in the 5th Division in February 1915 for service on the Western Front.

The 1/6th Battalion landed in France as GHQ Troops and saw considerable action on the Western Front under a number of different formations.

The 1/7th Battalion landed in France as part of the 15th Brigade in the 5th Division in November 1914 for service on the Western Front.

The Second Line (2/4th, 2/5th, 2/6th and 2/7th) and Third Line (Reserve) (3/4th, 3/5th, 3/6th and 3/7th) TF battalions did not go overseas, but remained as home defence and training units.

==== New Armies ====
The 8th (Service) Battalion landed in Gallipoli as part of the 40th Brigade in the 13th (Western) Division in June 1915; after evacuation to Egypt in January 1916 it moved to Mesopotamia in February 1916.

The 9th (Service) Battalion landed at Boulogne-sur-Mer as part of the 58th Brigade in the 19th (Western) Division in July 1915 for service on the Western Front.

The 10th (Service) Battalion and the 11th (Service) Battalion landed in France as part of the 75th Brigade in the 25th Division in September 1915 for service on the Western Front.

The 12th (Service) Battalion landed at Boulogne-sur-Mer as part of the 66th Brigade in the 22nd Division in September 1915 for service on the Western Front but moved to Salonika in November 1915.

The 13th (Service) Battalion landed in France as part of the 74th Brigade in the 25th Division in September 1915 for service on the Western Front.

The 15th (Service) Battalion (1st Birkenhead) and the 16th (Service) Battalion (2nd Birkenhead) (both 'Bantam battalions') landed at Le Havre as part of the 105th Brigade in the 35th Division in January 1916 for service on the Western Front.

=== Second World War ===
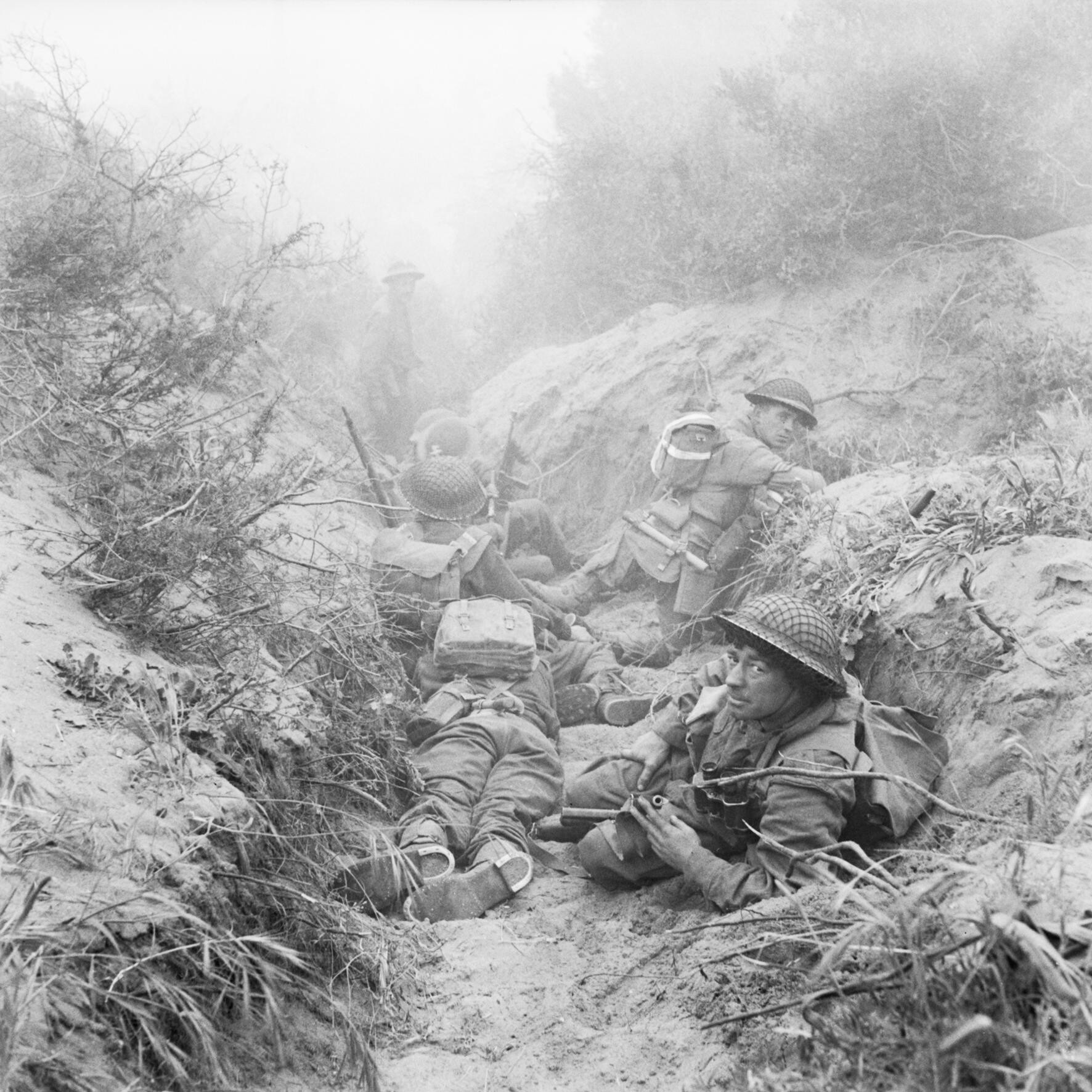
Men of the 7th Battalion, Cheshire Regiment, 5th Infantry Division's machine gun battalion, in a captured German communications trench during the offensive at Anzio, Italy, 22 May 1944.

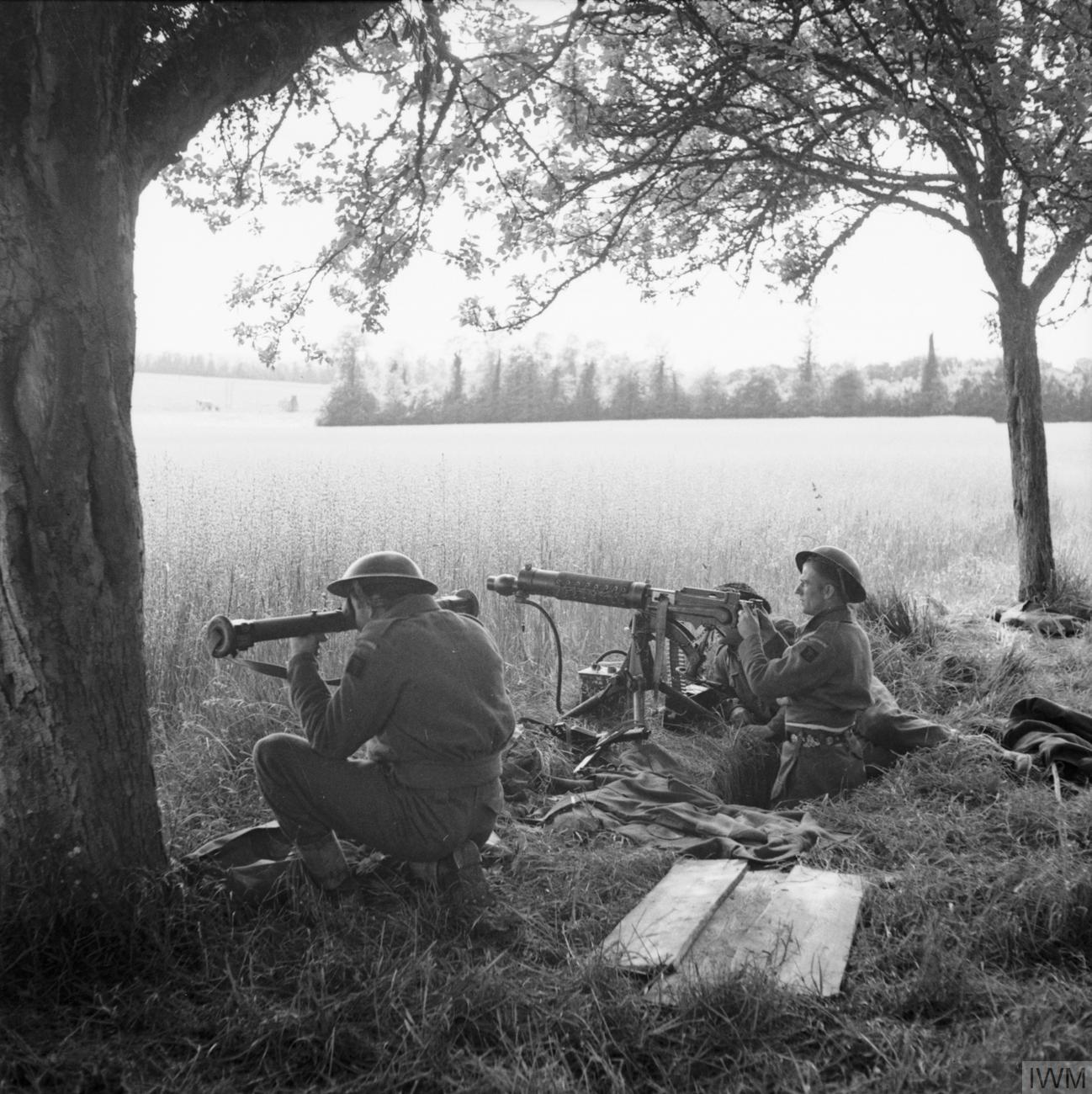
Vickers machine gun of 'B' Company of the 2nd Battalion, Cheshire Regiment, near Audrieu, France, 13 June 1944.

During the Second World War, the 2nd Battalion of the Cheshires served in France in 1940 with the rest of the British Expeditionary Force before fighting in the Battle of Dunkirk and subsequently being evacuated. The 1st Battalion fought in North Africa at Tobruk and subsequently took part in the crossing of the Rhine in March 1945. The 2nd Battalion took part in the D-Day landings in 1944, as part of the 50th (Northumbrian) Infantry Division, while the 6th and 7th Battalions fought in the Italian Campaign. The 6th Battalion served with the 44th (Home Counties) Infantry Division in North Africa before transferring to the 56th (London) Infantry Division. The 5th Battalion remained within the United Kingdom for the duration of the war, providing machine gun support for the 38th Infantry (Reserve) Division, the 53rd (Welsh) Infantry Division, and the 80th Infantry (Reserve) Division.

=== Post-war ===
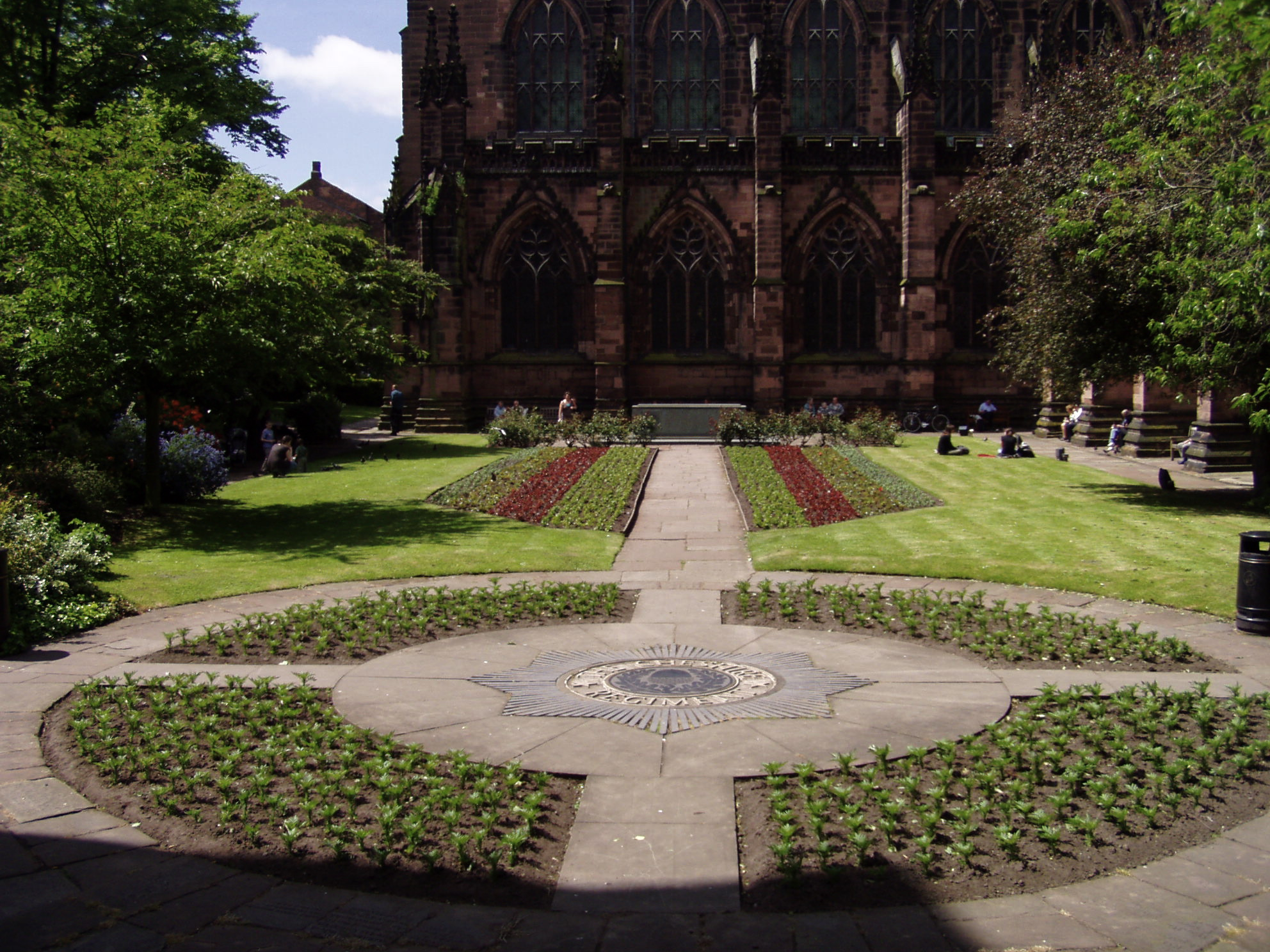
The First and Second World War memorial to the Cheshire Regiment, Chester Cathedral

After the War, the 1st and 2nd Battalions were amalgamated and became a depot battalion in 1948. The regiment was deployed to Cyprus and to Egypt in 1951 and to Malaya in 1957. It was posted to Abercorn Barracks in Ballykinler in 1960 and to Buller Barracks in Münster in 1962. While in Munster the regiment was deployed to Cyprus under UN command for six months from October 1964 to April 1965. The regiment moved to Netheravon in Wiltshire for six months in 1966 and then went to Warminster as Demonstration Battalion. The regiment moved to Weeton Barracks in 1968; during the latter part of 1968 the regiment was deployed to Bahrain for nine months, and was then sent to Derry in Northern Ireland at the start of the Troubles in 1970. In December 1970, the regiment was posted to Berlin for two years. The regiment returned to Weeton barracks in 1972 but undertook further tours in the Province throughout the 1970s.

The regiment moved to Elizabeth Barracks in Minden in 1977. In 1978, Mike Dauncey was appointed Colonel Commandant and in 1979 the regiment moved to Tidworth. The regiment became the resident regiment at Shackleton Barracks in Ballykelly in 1980 and in 1982; eight soldiers from the Cheshires were killed in the Droppin Well bombing. The regiment then spent two years, from 1984 to 1986, in Hong Kong. Between 1986 and 1988, the regiment was posted to Caterham Barracks as a public duties battalion and in 1988 it moved to Dale Barracks in Chester.

The regiment was posted to St Barbara's Barracks at Fallingbostel in 1991. It became the first Armoured Infantry unit to deploy to Bosnia on Operation Grapple 1, as part of 7th Armoured Brigade, on United Nations peace keeping duties to the former Yugoslavia in 1992. Then, after a period at Oakington Barracks between 1993 and 1996, it returned to Shackleton Barracks. It went to Beachley Barracks, near Chepstow in 1998 and to Alexander Barracks in Dhekelia in 2000. It returned to Kiwi Barracks at Bulford Camp in 2002 and was deployed to Iraq (Operation Telic 4) in 2004 before being sent back to Abercorn Barracks in 2005.

=== Amalgamation ===
The Cheshire Regiment was one of five line infantry regiments never to have been amalgamated in its history. It shared this claim with The Royal Scots, The Green Howards, The Royal Welch Fusiliers and The King's Own Scottish Borderers. In 2004, as a part of the reorganisation of the infantry, it was announced that the Cheshire Regiment would be amalgamated with the Staffordshire Regiment and the Worcestershire and Sherwood Foresters Regiment to form the new Mercian Regiment. In August 2007, the regiment became the 1st Battalion, the Mercian Regiment.

== Regimental museum ==
The Cheshire Military Museum is based at Chester Castle.

== Alliances ==
Alliances include:

- Canada – The Cape Breton Highlanders
- Canada – 2nd Battalion, The Nova Scotia Highlanders (Cape Breton)
- New Zealand – 22nd Battalion (The Richmond Regiment)
- India – 5th Battalion (Napiers), The Rajputana Rifles

== Battle honours ==
The regiment was awarded the following battle honours.

- Louisburg, Martinique 1762, Havannah, Meeanee, Hyderabad, Scinde, South Africa 1900–02
- The Great War (38 battalions): Mons, Le Cateau, Retreat from Mons, Marne 1914, 18, Aisne 1914, 18, La Bassee 1914, Armentieres 1914, Ypres 1914 '15 '17 '18, Nonne Bosschen, Gravenstafel, St. Julien, Frezenberg, Bellewaarde, Loos, Somme 1916 '18, Albert 1916 '18, Bazentin, Delville Wood, Pozieres, Guillemont, Flers-Courcelette, Morval, Thiepval, Le Transloy, Ancre Heights, Ancre 1916, Arras 1917 '18, Vimy 1917, Scarpe 1917 '18, Oppy, Messines 1917 '18, Pilckem, Langemarck 1917, Menin Road, Polygon Wood, Broodseinde, Poelcappelle, Passchendaele, Cambrai 1917 '18, St Quentin, Bapaume 1918, Rosieres, Lys, Estaires, Hazebrouck, Bailleul, Kemmel, Scherpenberg, Soissonais-Ourcq, Hindenburg Line, Canal du Nord, Courtrai, Selle, Valenciennes, Sambre, France and Flanders 1914–18, Italy 1917–18, Struma, Doiran 1917 '18, Macedonia 1915–18, Suvla, Sari Bair, Landing at Suvla, Scimitar Hill, Gallipoli 1915, Egypt 1915–17, Gaza, El Mughar, Jerusalem, Jericho, Tell 'Asur, Palestine 1917–18, Tigris 1916, Kut al Amara 1917, Bagdad, Mesopotamia 1916–18
- The Second World War: Dyle, Withdrawal to Escaut, St Omer-La Bassée, Wormhoudt, Cassel, Dunkirk 1940, Normandy Landing, Mont Pincon, St. Pierre La Vielle, Gheel, Nederrijn, Aam, Aller, North-West Europe 1940, '44–45, Sidi Barrani, Capture of Tobruk, Gazala, Mersa Matruh, Defence of Alamein Line, Deir el Shein, El Alamein, Mareth, Wadi Zeuss East, Wadi Zigzaou, Akarit, Wadi Akarit East, Enfidaville, North Africa 1940–43, Landing in Sicily, Primosole Bridge, Simeto Bridgehead, Sicily 1943, Sangro, Salerno, Santa Lucia, Battipaglia, Volturno Crossing, Monte Maro, Teano, Monte Camino, Garigliano Crossing, Minturno, Damiano, Anzio, Rome, Gothic Line, Coriano, Gemmano Ridge, Savignano, Senio Floodbank, Rimini Line, Ceriano Ridge, Valli di Comacchio, Italy 1943–45, Malta 1941–42
- 4th Battalion: South Africa 1901–02
- 5th, 6th Battalions: South Africa 1900–02

== Victoria Crosses ==
Victoria Crosses awarded to men of the regiment were:

- Second Lieutenant Hugh Colvin, First World War (20 September 1917)
- Private Thomas Alfred Jones, First World War (25 September 1916)

== Colonels of the Regiment ==
Colonels of the regiment were:

- 1689: Col. Henry Howard, 7th Duke of Norfolk, KG
- 1689–1701: Lt-Gen. Sir Henry Bellasyse
- 1701–1702: Maj-Gen. William Selwyn
- 1702–1712: Maj-Gen. Thomas Handasyde
- 1712–1730: Lt-Gen. Roger Handasyde
- 1730–1734: Lt-Gen. William Barrell
- 1734–1737: Gen. James St. Clair
- 1737–1738: Maj-Gen. John Moyle
- 1738–1741: Brig-Gen. Thomas Paget
- 1741–1757: Maj-Gen. Richard O'Farrell

=== The 22nd Regiment of Foot ===
- 1757–1762: Maj-Gen. Edward Whitmore
- 1762–1782: Gen. Thomas Gage

=== The 22nd (Cheshire) Regiment ===
- 1782–1791: Lt-Gen. Charles O'Hara
- 1791–1795: Gen. David Dundas, GCB
- 1795–1798: Maj-Gen. Willam Crosbie
- 1798–1806: Lt-Gen. John Graves Simcoe
- 1806–1809: Gen. Sir James Henry Craig, KB
- 1809–1843: Gen. Edward Finch
- 1843–1853: Lt-Gen. Sir Charles James Napier, GCB
- 1853–1860: Lt-Gen. Sir William Francis Patrick Napier, KCB
- 1860–1872: Gen. Sir John Lysaght Pennefather, GCB
- 1872–1873: Lt-Gen. George Thomas Conolly Napier, CB
- 1873–1886: Gen. Sir Trevor Chute, KCB

=== The Cheshire Regiment ===
- 1886–1888: Gen. Frederick Darley George, CB
- 1888–1894: Gen. Sir William Montagu Scott McMurdo, GCB
- 1894–1909: Gen. David Anderson
- 1909–1911: Lt-Gen. Sir Charles Tucker, GCB, GCVO
- 1911–1914: Maj-Gen. William Henry Ralston, CB
- 1914–1928: Maj-Gen. Sir Edward Ritchie Coryton Graham, KCB, KCMG
- 1928–1930: Lt-Gen. Sir Warren Hastings Anderson, KCB
- 1930–1947: Col. Arthur Crookenden, CBE, DSO
- 1947–1950: Brig. Geoffrey Parker Harding, CBE, DSO, MC
- 1950–1955: Lt-Gen. Arthur Ernest Percival, CB, DSO, OBE, MC, DL
- 1955–1962: Maj-Gen. Thomas Brodie, CB, CBE, DS0
- 1962–1968: Gen. Sir Charles Henry Pepys Harington, GCB, CBE, DSO, MC
- 1968–1971: Lt-Gen. Sir Napier Crookenden, KCB, DSO, OBE
- 1971–1978: Maj-Gen. Peter Lawrence de Carteret Martin, CBE
- 1978–1985: Brig. Michael Donald Keen Dauncey, DSO, DL
- 1985–1992: Brig. William Keith Lloyd Prosser, CBE, MC
- 1992–1999: Brig. Alfred James MacGregor Percival, OBE
- 1999–2006: Maj-Gen. Keith Skempton, CBE
- 2006–2007: Col. Andrew Richard Darwen Sharpe, OBE

== The Cheshires in literature ==
A night-encounter between new recruits to the Cheshires on their way to the Somme and a new Brigade of the West Kents, going the same way, was the subject of a 1935 poem by F. L. Lucas, 'Morituri - August 1915, on the road from Morlancourt', which ends:

A whisper came – "The Cheshires". Unseen on our leaf-hung track,
Their gay mirth mocked our caution, till the stillness flooded back
And deep in the sodden woodland we crept to our bivouack.
But still when grave heads are shaken and sombre seems the day,
Beyond the years I hear it – faint, phantom, far away –
That lilt of the Cheshires laughing, down through the dark to Bray.

== Sources ==
- Joslen, H. F. (2003) [1960]. Orders of Battle: Second World War, 1939–1945. Uckfield, East Sussex: Naval and Military Press. ISBN 978-1-84342-474-1.
