= Drucourt =

- Commune
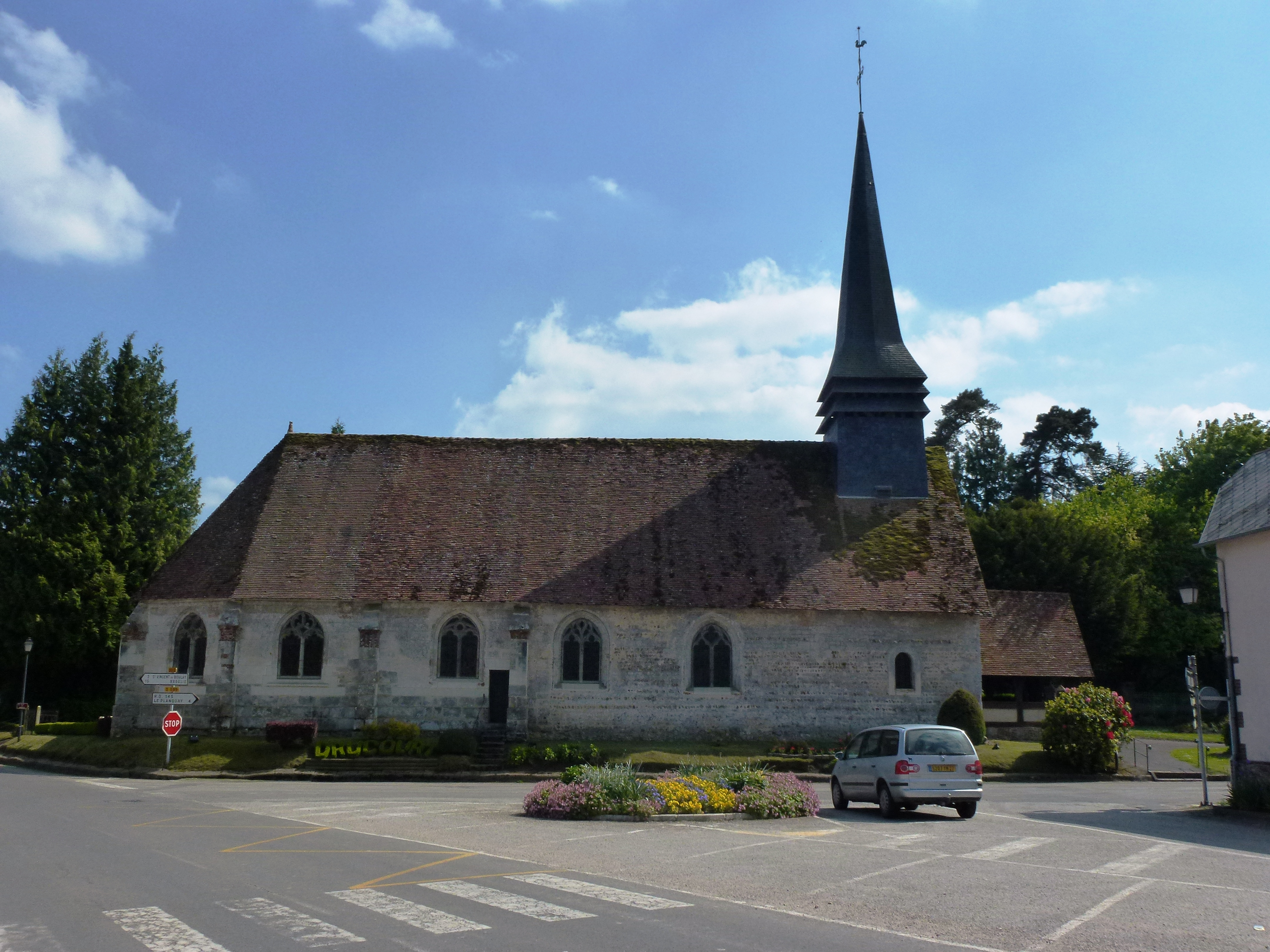
- The church in Drucourt

- Coat of arms
- Location of Drucourt
- Location within France Location within Normandy
- Coordinates: 49°07′00″N 0°27′59″E
- Country: France
- Region: Normandy
- Department: Eure
- Arrondissement: Bernay
- Canton: Beuzeville

Government
  - Mayor (2020–2026): Nicolas Thuret
- Area^{1}: 11.97 km^{2} (4.62 sq mi)
- Elevation: 170 m (560 ft)
- Highest elevation: 198 m (650 ft)
- Lowest elevation: 169 m (554 ft)
- Population (2023): 568
  - Density: 47.5/km^{2} (123/sq mi)
- Time zone: UTC+01:00 (CET)
  - Summer (DST): UTC+02:00 (CEST)
- INSEE/Postal code: 27207 /27230
- ^{1} French Land Register data, which excludes lakes, ponds, glaciers > 1 km^{2} (0.386 sq mi or 247 acres) and river estuaries.

Drucourt (French pronunciation: [dʁykuʁ]) is a commune in the Eure department in northern France.

== Population ==
Historical population
Year	Pop.	±% p.a.
1968	461	—
1975	469	+0.25%
1982	512	+1.26%
1990	554	+0.99%
1999	614	+1.15%
2007	592	−0.46%
2012	610	+0.60%
2017	606	−0.13%
2023	568	−1.07%
Source: INSEE

== See also ==
- Communes of the Eure department
