= Edward Whitmore =

British Army general

Brigadier-General Edward Whitmore
- Born: 1691; England
- Died: 10 December 1761 (aged 69–70) Off Plymouth, Massachusetts

Brigadier-General Edward Whitmore (1691 – 10 December 1761) was a British Army officer who served in Europe and North America.

== Biography ==
He was born in England in 1691, a son of Arthur Whitmore of York, England. He served in the War of the Austrian Succession, and was made lieutenant-colonel of the 36th Regiment of Foot in 1747. He was promoted in July 1757, colonel of the 22nd Regiment of Foot, and next year was made brigadier general. He was at the Siege of Louisburg in 1758, and, after the surrender of the town, was left there as military governor.

On a voyage to Boston in December 1761, the ship put into Plymouth, Massachusetts harbour to seek shelter from contrary winds. On 10 December 1761, near Plymouth, Whitmore, going on deck at midnight, accidentally fell overboard and drowned. His body was taken up next morning near the Gurnet, and carried to Boston in the same vessel. He was buried on 16 December 1761 in the King's Chapel.

Military offices
Preceded by Richard O'Farrell	Colonel of the 22nd Regiment of Foot; 1757–1761	Succeeded by Hon. Thomas Gage
