= Siege of Louisbourg (1758) =

1758 siege of the French and Indian War

- Part of the French and Indian War and the Seven Years' War
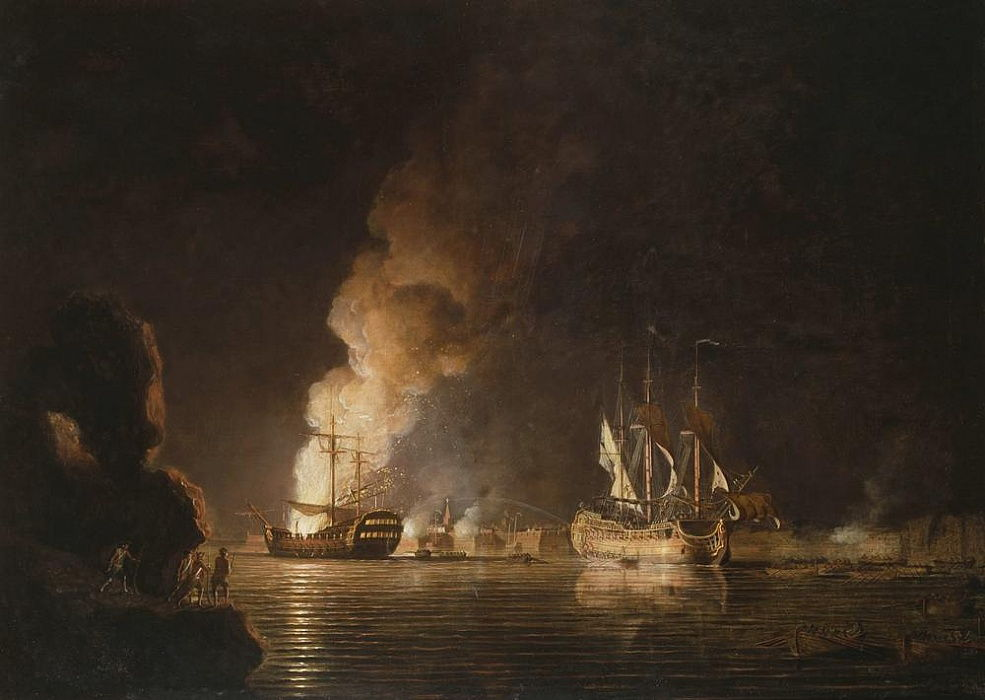
- 1758 painting of the siege
Date	8 June – 26 July 1758
Location	Louisbourg, Île-Royale, French Canada 45°55′17″N 59°58′13″W
Result	British victory

Belligerents
Great Britain; British America	France; Mi'kmaq

Commanders and leaders
Jeffery Amherst; James Wolfe; Charles Lawrence; Edward Whitmore; Edward Boscawen; James Rogers	Augustin Drucour; Louis de l' Isle

Strength
26,000; 40 warships 150 transport vessels	7,000; 7 ships of the line 4 frigates 1 fluyt

Casualties and losses
172 killed 355 wounded	102 killed 303 wounded 6,600 captured 3 ships of the line destroyed 2 ships of the line captured 1 ship of the line scuttled 2 frigates scuttled 1 fluyt captured

The siege of Louisbourg (8 June – 26 July 1758) was fought during the Seven Years' War on Cape Breton Island between an attacking British force and defending French and Mi'kmaq troops. The French attempted to send reinforcements by sea, but were not able to as the fleet was blockaded and defeated by the British. The battle ended French colonial dominance in Atlantic Canada and led to the subsequent British campaign to capture Quebec in 1759 and the remainder of New France the following year.

== Background ==
The British government realized that with the Fortress of Louisbourg under French control, the Royal Navy could not sail up the St. Lawrence River unmolested for an attack on Quebec. After an expedition against Louisbourg in 1757 led by Lord Loudon was turned back due to a strong French naval deployment, the British under the leadership of William Pitt resolved to try again with new commanders.

Pitt assigned the task of capturing the fortress to Major General Jeffery Amherst. Amherst's brigadiers were Charles Lawrence, James Wolfe and Edward Whitmore, and command of naval operations was assigned to Admiral Edward Boscawen. The chief engineer was John Henry Bastide who had been present at the first siege of Louisbourg in 1745 and was chief engineer at Fort St Philip, Minorca, in 1756 when the British had surrendered the fort and island to the French after a long siege.

As they had in 1757, the French planned to defend Louisbourg by means of a large naval build-up. However, the British blockaded the French fleet sailing from Toulon when it arrived in Cartagena, and defeated a French relief force at the Battle of Cartagena.

The French consequently abandoned their attempt to reinforce Louisbourg from the Mediterranean, and only 11 ships were available to oppose the British off Louisbourg. Most of the cannons and men were moved inside the fort and five ships (Apollon, Fidèle, Chèvre, Biche, Diane) were sunk to block the entrance to the harbour. On 9 July, Echo tried to slip out of the harbour under the cover of a dense fog, but was intercepted and seized by HMS Scarborough and HMS Junon. This left the French with only five half-empty ships in the harbour : Célèbre (64), Entreprenant (74), Capricieux (64), Prudent (74) and Bienfaisant (64).

British forces assembled at Halifax, Nova Scotia where army and navy units spent most of May training together as the massive invasion fleet came together. After a large gathering at the Great Pontack, on 29 May, the Royal Navy fleet departed from Halifax for Louisbourg.

== Order of battle ==
The fleet consisted of 150 transport ships and 40 men-of-war. Housed in these ships were almost 14,000 soldiers, almost all of whom were regulars (with the exception of four companies of American rangers). The force was divided into three divisions: Red, commanded by James Wolfe, Blue, commanded by Charles Lawrence and White commanded by Edward Whitmore. On 2 June the British force anchored in Gabarus Bay, 3 miles (4.8 km) from Louisbourg.

The French commander (and governor of Île-Royale (New France)), the Chevalier de Drucour, had at his disposal some 3,500 regulars as well as approximately 3,500 marines and sailors from the French warships in the harbour. However, unlike the previous year, the French navy was unable to assemble in significant numbers, leaving the French squadron at Louisbourg outnumbered five to one by the British fleet. Drucour ordered trenches to be prepared and defended by some 2,000 French troops, along with other defences, such as an artillery battery, at Kennington Cove.

=== British forces ===
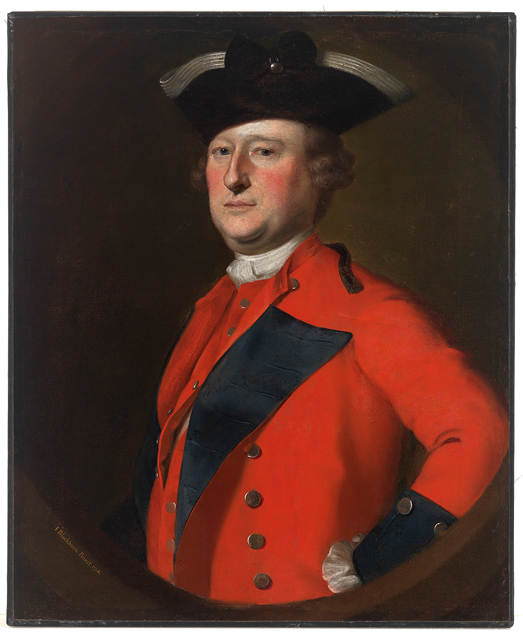
Major General Jeffery Amherst was tasked with the capture of the French Fortress of Louisbourg

British forces were commanded by General Jeffery Amherst (appx. 11,000 regulars and 200 American rangers (colonials)).

- 3 companies of Rogers' Rangers
- Gorham's Rangers (only 1 company) – Colonial Massachusetts
- Louisbourg Grenadiers (composite, made up of grenadiers from the 22nd, 45th, and 40th regiments)
- Commander Artillery & Engineers
  - Captain Ord's Company, Royal Artillery
  - 11 Miners
  - 11 Engineers
  - 100 Carpenters
  - Royal Train of Artillery (324 men)
- Brigadier Whitmore's Brigade under Brigadier General Edward Whitmore
  - 1st Battalion, 1st Regiment of Foot
  - 22nd Regiment of Foot
  - 40th Regiment of Foot
  - 48th Regiment of Foot
  - 3rd Battalion, 60th (Royal American) Regiment of Foot
- Brigadier Wolfe's Brigade under Brigadier General James Wolfe
  - 17th Regiment of Foot
  - 35th Regiment of Foot
  - 47th Regiment of Foot
  - 2nd Battalion, 60th (Royal American) Regiment of Foot
- Brigadier Lawrence's Brigade under Brigadier General Charles Lawrence
  - 15th Regiment of Foot
  - 28th Regiment of Foot
  - 45th Regiment of Foot
  - 58th Regiment of Foot
  - 78th Regiment (Fraser's Highlanders)

=== French forces ===
==== Ground troops ====
The French garrison in the Fortress of Louisbourg was under the command of Augustin de Boschenry de Drucour. Between 1755 and 1758, the garrison expanded from 1,200 to around 6,000 men. Troops forming the garrison included:

- 2nd Battalion, Duke of Artois' Regiment (520 troops)
- 2nd Battalion, Bourgogne Regiment (520 troops)
- 2nd Battalion, Cambis Regiment (650 troops)
- 2nd Battalion, Foreign Volunteers Regiment (660 troops)
- Detached companies, mostly from the Compagnies franches de la marine (1,000 troops)
- Bombardiers de la Marine (120 troops)
- Canadian Militia (700 troops)
- French-allied Indians

==== Naval forces & reinforcements ====
Many naval forces were sent from France to Louisbourg, but the majority of them did not arrive in time. The divisions and squadrons sent to assist included:

- Jean-Antoine de Charry des Gouttes' Division (departed from Île-d'Aix on 9 March, arrived in Louisbourg on an unknown date)
  - 74-gun ship of the line Prudent – Captured then destroyed on 26 July
  - 64-gun ship of the line Raisonnable – Captured on 29 April
  - 56-gun ship of the line Apollon – Scuttled on 28 June
  - 24-gun frigate Diane – Scuttled on 29 June
  - 24-gun frigate Mutine – Fate unknown
  - 24-gun frigate Fidèle – Scuttled on 28 June
  - 24-gun frigate Galatée – Captured in April as she left Bordeaux escorting a convoy of twelve transports which were also captured
  - 12-gun fluyt Messager – Collided with Raisonnable on 13 March before returning to Rochefort
  - 10-gun fluyt Chèvre – Scuttled on 28 June
- Louis-Joseph Beaussier de l' Isle's Division (departed Brest on 10 April, arrived in Louisbourg on an unknown date)
  - 74-gun ship of the line Entreprenant – Destroyed on 21 July by flaming debris from Celebre
  - 64-gun ship of the line Bizarre – Left Louisbourg on 8 June to participate in the siege of Quebec, joining Louis Charles du Chaffault de Besné's division before returning to Lorient in September
  - 64-gun ship of the line Célèbre – Destroyed on 21 July
  - 64-gun ship of the line Capricieux – Destroyed on 21 July by flaming debris from Célèbre
  - 64-gun ship of the line Bienfaisant – Captured on 25/26 July, integrated into the Royal Navy
  - 30-gun frigate Comtète – Left Louisbourg at start of the siege, then returned to France alone
  - 28-gun frigate L'Echo – Sent to Quebec to advise the garrison there of the siege of Louisbourg, captured on 25 May

== Siege ==
Weather conditions in the first week of June made any landing impossible and the British were only able to mount a bombardment of the improvised shore defences of Gabarus Bay from a frigate. However, conditions improved, and at daybreak on 8 June Amherst launched his assault using a flotilla of large boats, organized in seven divisions, each commanded by one of his brigadiers. French defences were initially successful and after heavy losses, Wolfe ordered a retreat. However, at the last minute, a boatload of Howe's light infantry in Wolfe's division found a rocky inlet protected from French fire and secured a beachhead. Wolfe redirected the rest of his division to follow. Outflanked, the French retreated rapidly back to their fortress.

Continuing heavy seas and the difficulty inherent to moving siege equipment over boggy terrain delayed the commencement of the formal siege. In the meantime, Wolfe was sent with 1,220 picked men around the harbour to seize Lighthouse Point, which dominated the harbour entrance. This he did on 12 June. After eleven days, on 19 June, the British artillery batteries were in position and the orders were given to open fire on the French. The British battery consisted of seventy cannons and mortars of all sizes. Within hours, the guns had destroyed walls and damaged several buildings. On 21 July a mortar round from a British gun on Lighthouse Point struck a 64-gun French ship of the line, Célèbre, and set it ablaze. A stiff breeze fanned the fire, and shortly after Célèbre caught fire, two other French ships, Entreprenant and Capricieux, had also caught fire. Entreprenant sank later in the day, depriving the French of the largest ship in the Louisbourg fleet.

The next major blow to French morale came on the evening of 23 July, at 10:00. A British "hot shot" set the King's Bastion on fire. The King's Bastion was the fortress headquarters and the largest building in North America in 1758. Its destruction eroded confidence and reduced morale in the French troops and their hopes to lift the British siege.

=== Naval action ===
Most historians regard the British actions of 25 July as the "straw that broke the camel's back". Using a thick fog as cover, Admiral Boscawen sent a cutting-out party to destroy the last two French ships in the harbour. The British raiders eliminated these two French ships of the line, capturing Bienfaisant and burning Prudent, thus clearing the way for the Royal Navy to enter the harbour. James Cook, who later became famous as an explorer, took part in this operation and recorded it in his ship's log book.

Brigadier General James Wolfe at the siege of Louisbourg

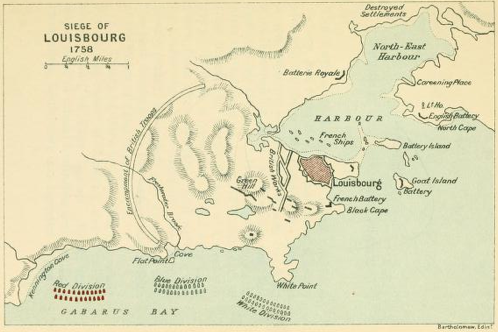
A map of Louisbourg during the siege

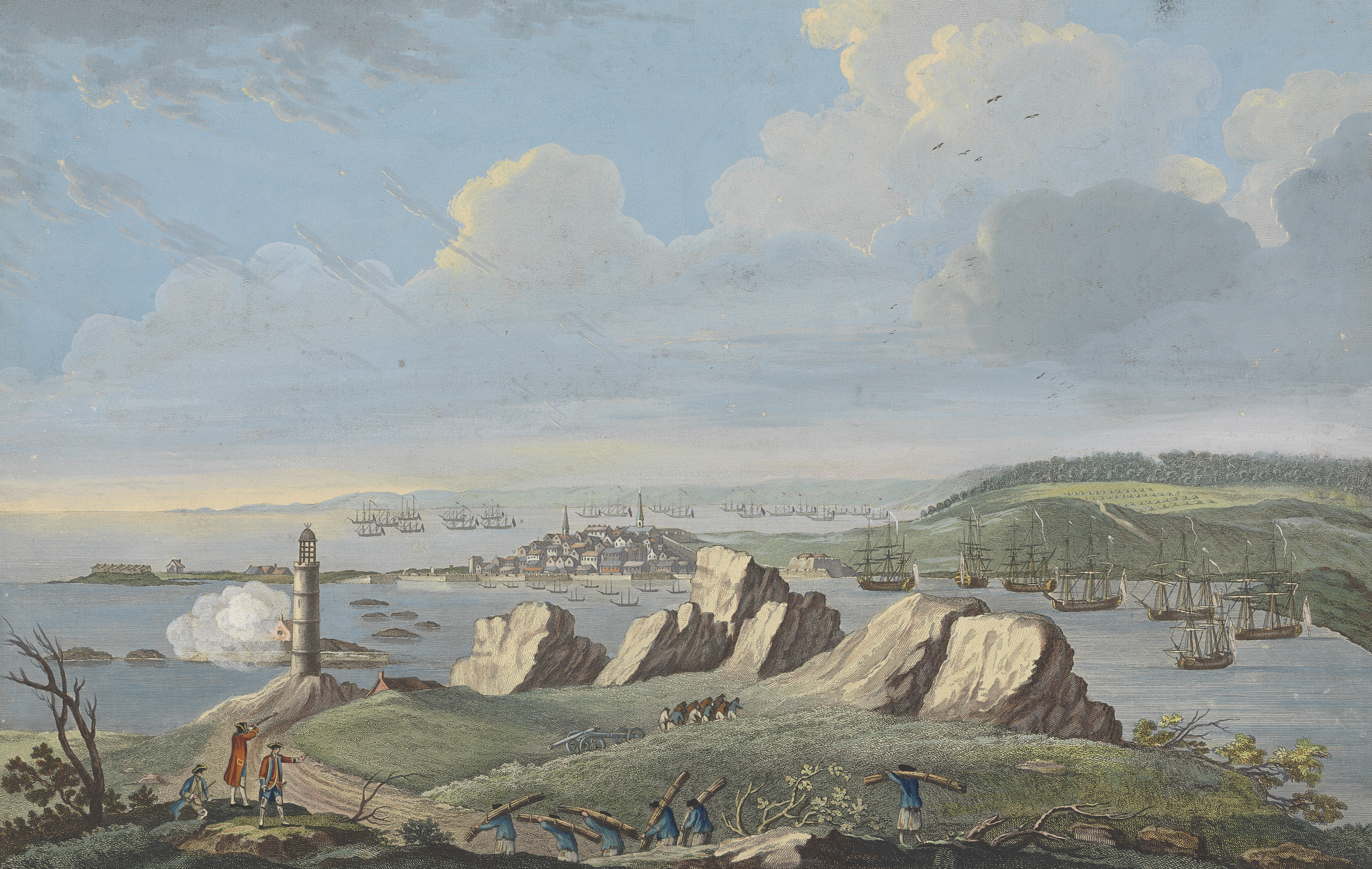
View of Louisbourg when the city was besieged by British forces in 1758

=== Capitulation ===
On 26 July the French surrendered. Having fought a spirited defence, the French expected to be accorded the honours of war, as they had given to the surrendering British at the Battle of Minorca. However, Amherst refused, tales of the atrocities supposedly committed by France's native allies at the surrender of Fort Oswego and Fort William Henry probably fresh in his mind. The defenders of Louisbourg were ordered to surrender all of their arms, equipment and flags. These actions outraged Drucour, but because the safety of the non-combatant inhabitants of Louisbourg depended upon him he reluctantly accepted the terms of surrender. The Cambis regiment refused to honour the terms of surrender, breaking its muskets and burning its regimental flags rather than hand them over to the British victors. Brigadier-General Whitmore was appointed the new Governor of Louisbourg, and remained there with four regiments.

== Aftermath ==
Louisbourg had held out long enough to prevent an attack on Quebec in 1758. However the fall of the fortress led to the loss of French territory across Atlantic Canada. From Louisbourg, British forces spent the remainder of the year routing French forces and occupying French settlements in what is today New Brunswick, Prince Edward Island and Newfoundland. The second wave of the Acadian expulsion began. The British engaged in the St. John River Campaign, the Cape Sable Campaign, the Petitcodiac River Campaign, the Ile Saint-Jean Campaign, and the removal of Acadians in the Gulf of St. Lawrence Campaign (1758). After the siege, 3,100 Acadians were deported, of which an estimated 1,649 died by drowning or disease.

The loss of Louisbourg deprived New France of naval protection, opening the Saint Lawrence to attack. Louisbourg was used in 1759 as the staging point for General Wolfe's famous siege of Quebec ending French rule in North America. Following the surrender of Quebec, British forces and engineers set about methodically destroying the fortress with explosives, ensuring that it could not return to French possession a second time in any eventual peace treaty. By 1760, the entire fortress was reduced to mounds of rubble. In 1763 the Treaty of Paris saw France formally cede Canada, including Cape Breton Island, to the British. In 1768 the last of the British garrison departed along with most of the remaining civilian inhabitants.

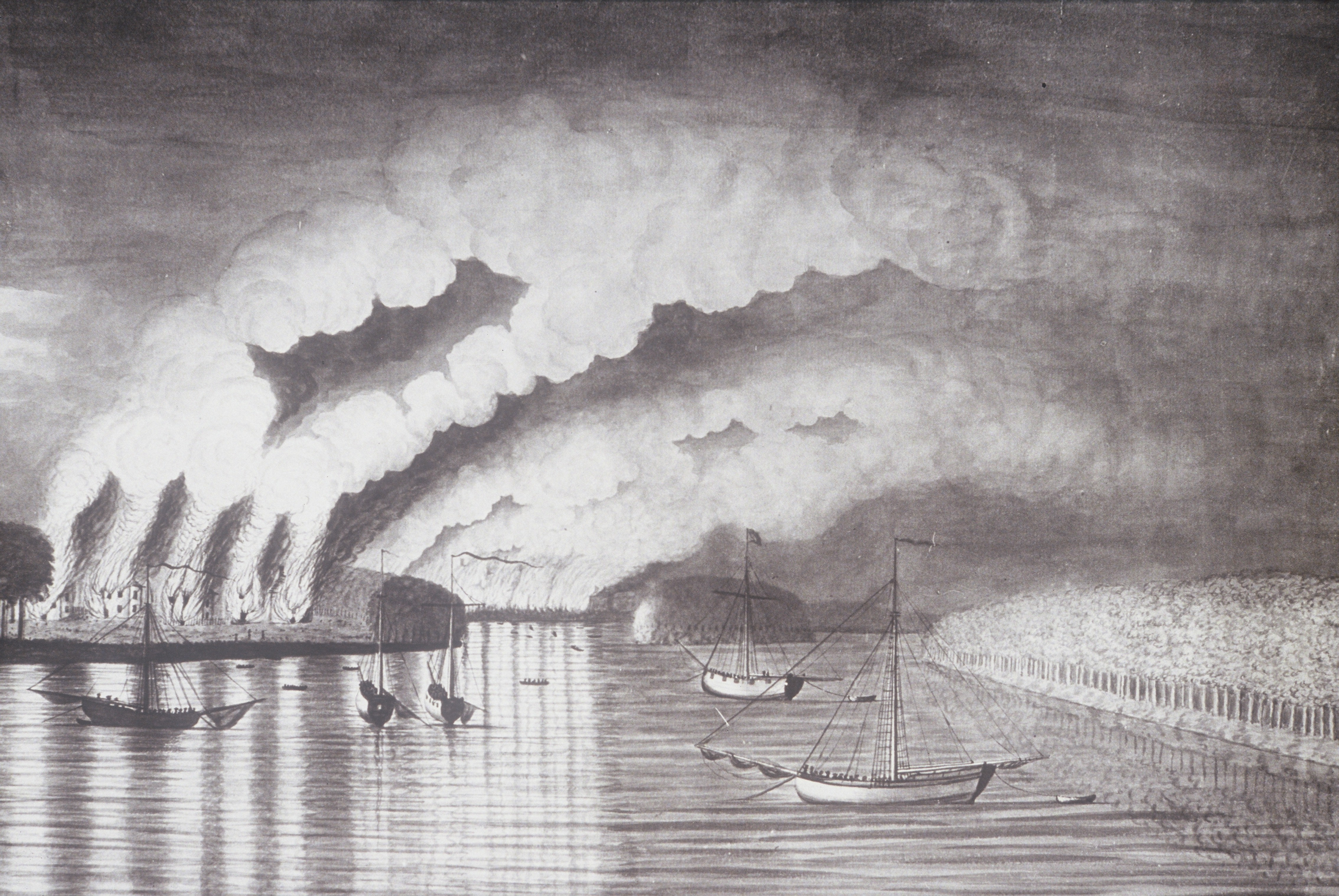
The fall of Louisbourg brought a second wave of the Acadian expulsion, as the British engaged in a series of campaigns to deport the Acadians

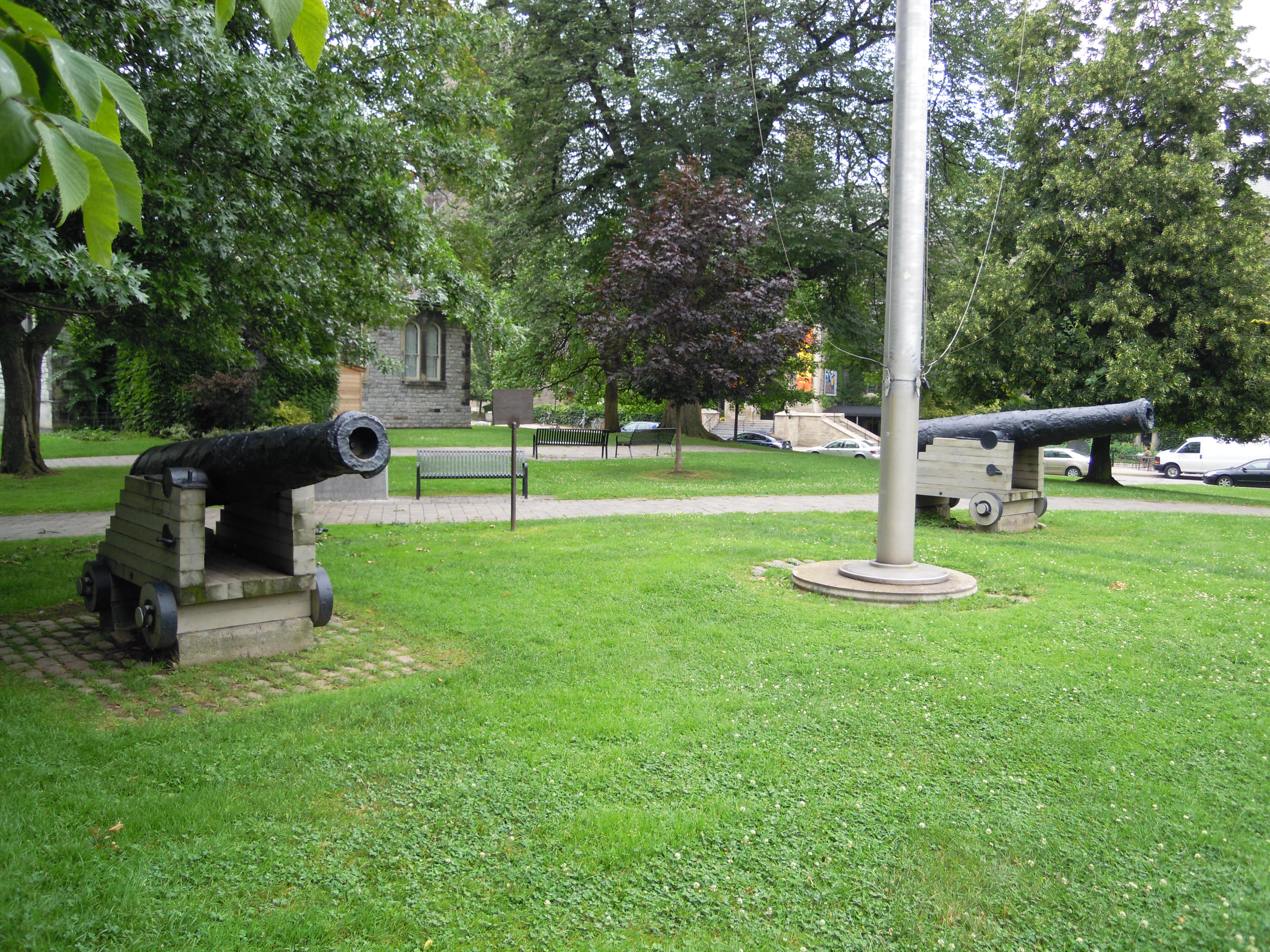
French cannons captured from Louisbourg in Toronto

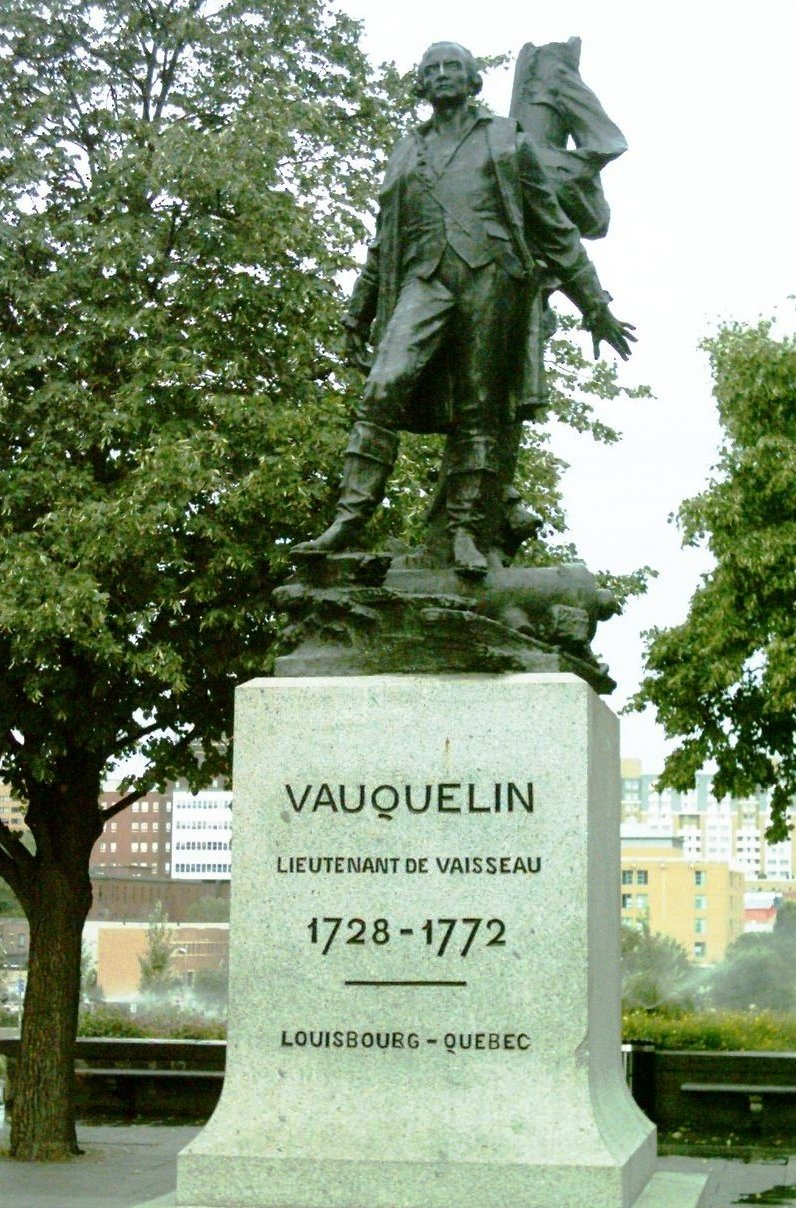
The statue of Jean Vauquelin

== Royal Navy fleet throughout the siege ==
Ship	Guns	Admiral	Captain
HMS Namur	90	Edward Boscawen	Matthew Buckle
HMS Royal William	84	Sir Charles Hardy	Thomas Evans
HMS Princess Amelia	80	Admiral Philip Durell	John Bray
HMS Invincible	74		John Bentley
HMS Dublin	74		George Rodney
HMS Terrible	74		Richard Collins
HMS Northumberland	70		Lord Colville
HMS Vanguard	70		Robert Swanton
HMS Orford	70		Richard Spry
HMS Burford	70		James Gambier
HMS Somerset	70		Edward Hughes
HMS Lancaster	70		George Edgcumbe
HMS Devonshire	66		William Gordon
HMS Bedford	64		Thorpe Fowke
HMS Captain	64		John Amherst
HMS Prince Frederick	64		Robert Mann
HMS Pembroke	60		John Simcoe
HMS Kingston	60		William Parry
HMS York	60		Hugh Pigot
HMS Prince of Orange	60		John Fergusson
HMS Defiance	60		Patrick Baird
HMS Nottingham	60		Samuel Marshall
HMS Centurion	54		William Mantell
HMS Sutherland	50		John Rous

== See also ==
- France in the Seven Years War
- Great Britain in the Seven Years War
- Louisburgh, County Mayo, a town named after the battle
- Military history of Nova Scotia
- Louisbourg Garrison

== Bibliography ==
- Anderson, Fred. Crucible of War (2000) pp 250–256
- Brumwell, Stephen. Paths of Glory: The Life and Death of General James Wolfe. Hambledon Continuum, 2007 ISBN 9781847252081
- Chartrand, Rene Louisbourg 1758
- Hough, Richard. Captain James Cook: a biography. Hodder & Stoughton, 1995
- Fowler, William M. Empires at War: The French and Indian War and the Struggle For North America. Vancouver: Douglas & McIntyre Ltd., 2005
- Hitsman, J. McKay and C.C.J. Bond. "The Assault Landing at Louisbourg, 1758," Canadian Historical Review (1954) 35:314–330.
- A.J.B. Johnson, Endgame 1758:The Promise, the Glory and the Despair of Louisbourg's Last Decade, Sydney, NS: Capre Breton University Press, 2008
- McLennan, J.S (2000, originally 1918). Louisbourg: From its Foundation to its Fall, 1713–1758. Halifax: The Book Room Limited.
- Warner, Oliver. With Wolfe to Quebec. Toronto: William Collins Sons and Company Ltd., 1972 ISBN 0002119420
- The Naval Chronicle. Vol. 07. Bunney & Gold.
