= Richard O'Farrell (British Army officer) =

Major-General Richard O'Farrell (died 3 July 1757) was an officer of the British Army.

== Biography ==
He was nominated ensign in a regiment of foot on 7 March 1692, and he served with reputation in the wars of King William III and of Queen Anne. On 20 December 1722 he was promoted to the lieutenant-colonelcy of the 9th Regiment of Foot, and he performed the duties of commanding officer to that corps many years, with credit to himself and advantage to the service. On 12 August 1741, following the decease of Brigadier-General Paget, King George II rewarded the long and faithful service of Lieutenant-Colonel O'Farrell with the colonelcy of the 22nd Regiment of Foot. In 1746, Colonel O'Farrell was promoted to the rank of brigadier-general, and in 1754 to that of major-general. He died on 3 July 1757.

Military offices
Preceded by Thomas Paget	Colonel of the 22nd Regiment of Foot; 1741–1757	Succeeded by Edward Whitmore
