= Troupes coloniales =

French Colonial Forces
- Troupes coloniales
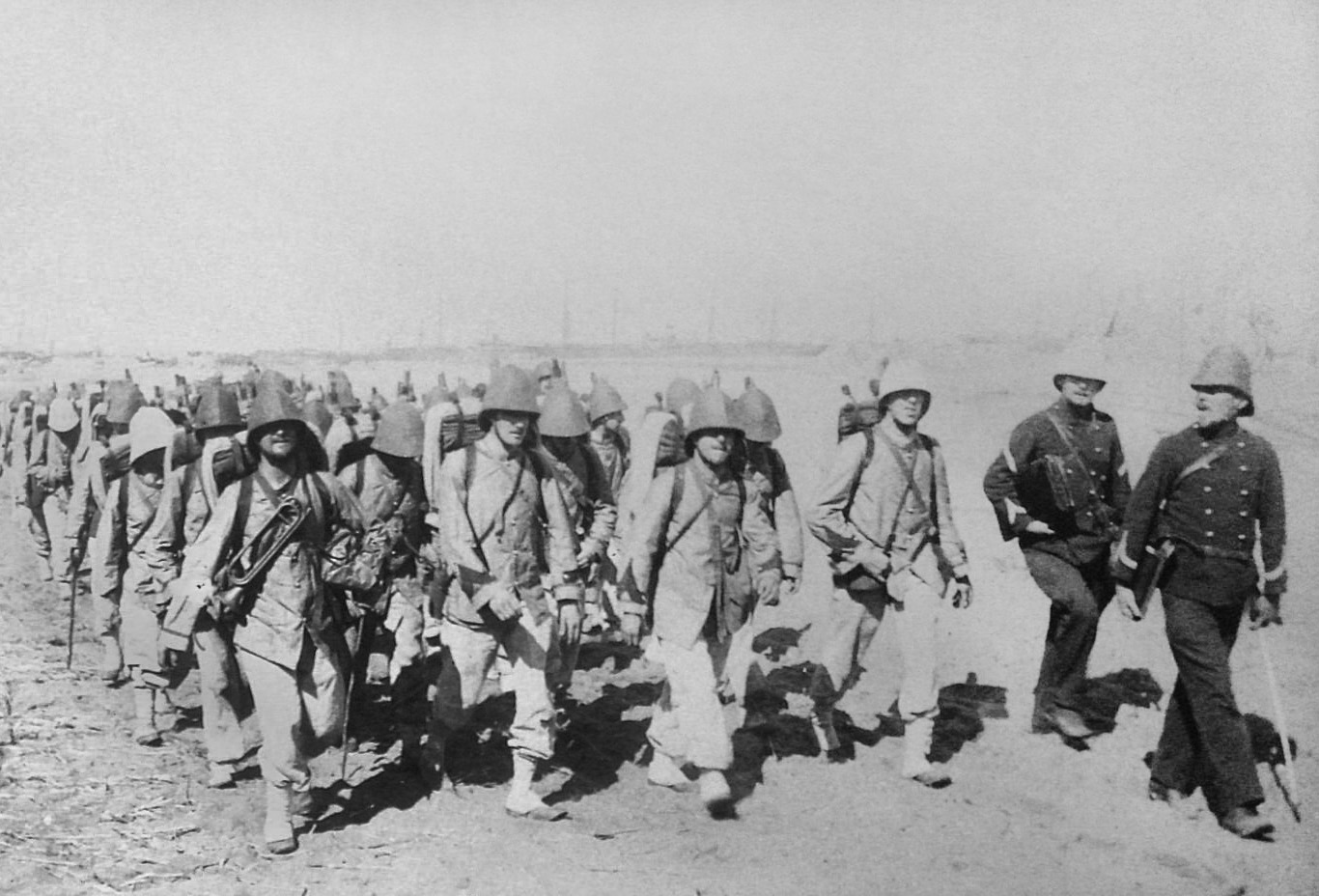
- French regulars of the Colonial Infantry disembarking in Madagascar 1895.
- Active: 1900–1961
- Countries: French colonies and overseas territories
- Allegiance: France
- Type: Marines / Colonial troops
- Role: Colonial warfare Amphibious warfare Expeditionary warfare
- Engagements: World War I World War II; First Indochina War; Algerian War

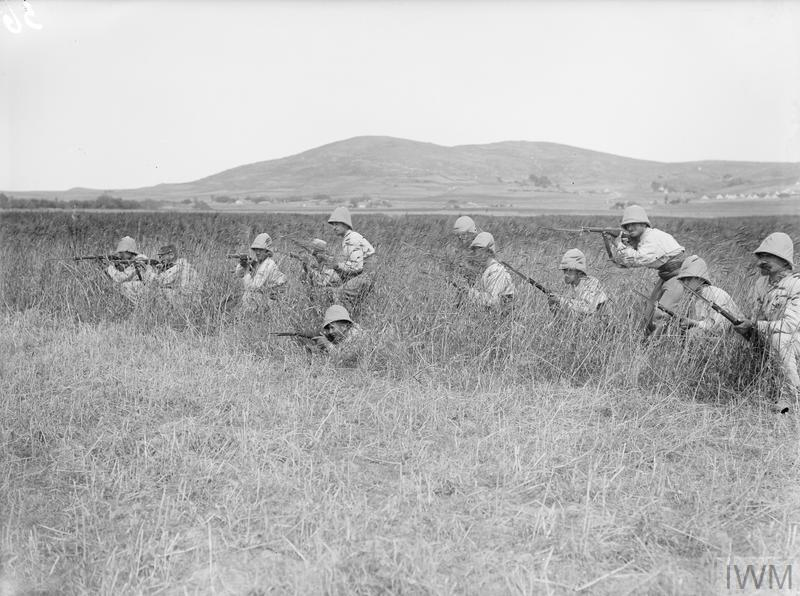
French marines ('marsouins') of the Infanterie Coloniale, from a Régiment Mixte Coloniale, practising an advance at Mudros in May 1915, prior to deployment to Gallipoli.

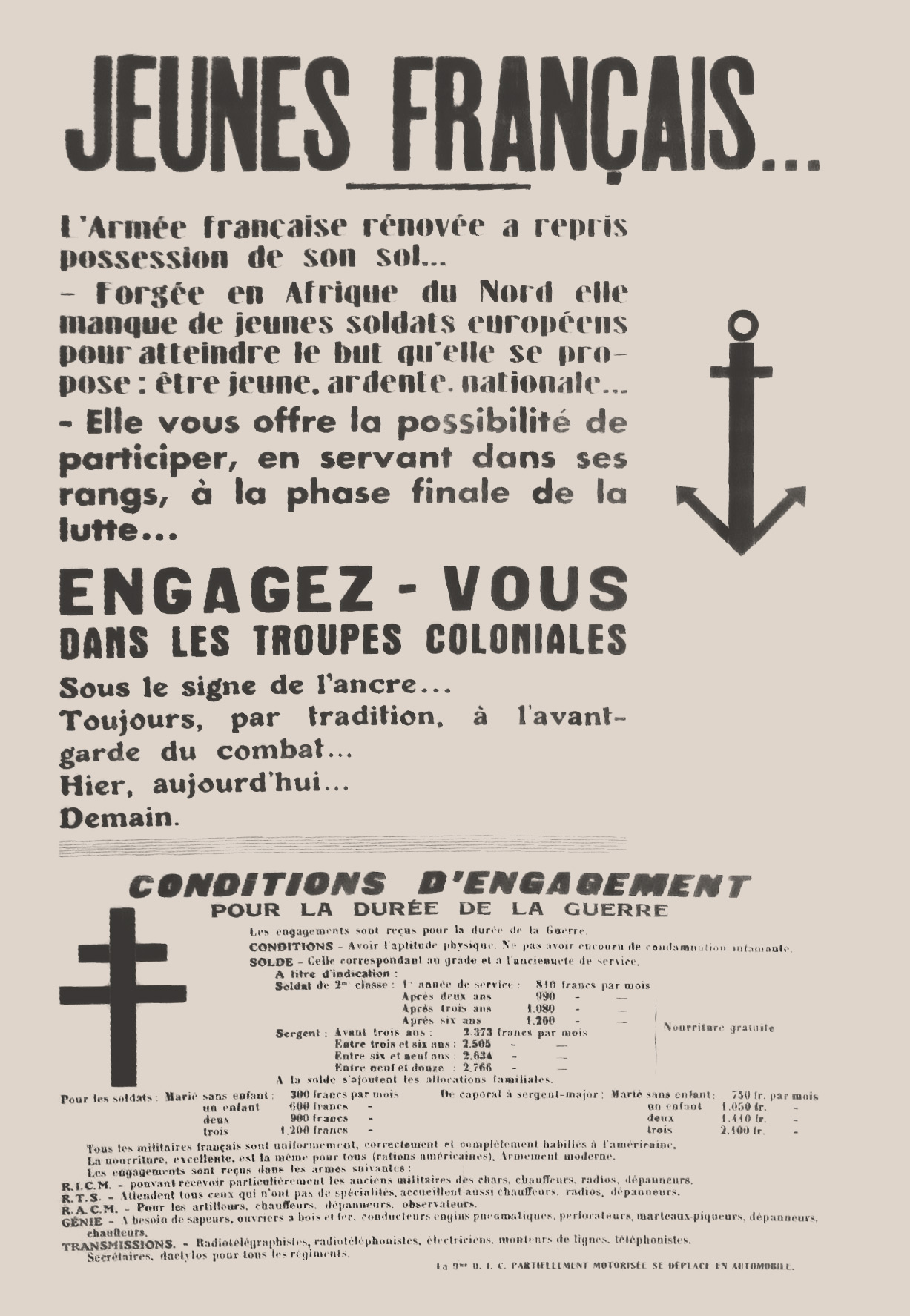
Recruitment poster of the Colonial Forces for the Free French Forces.

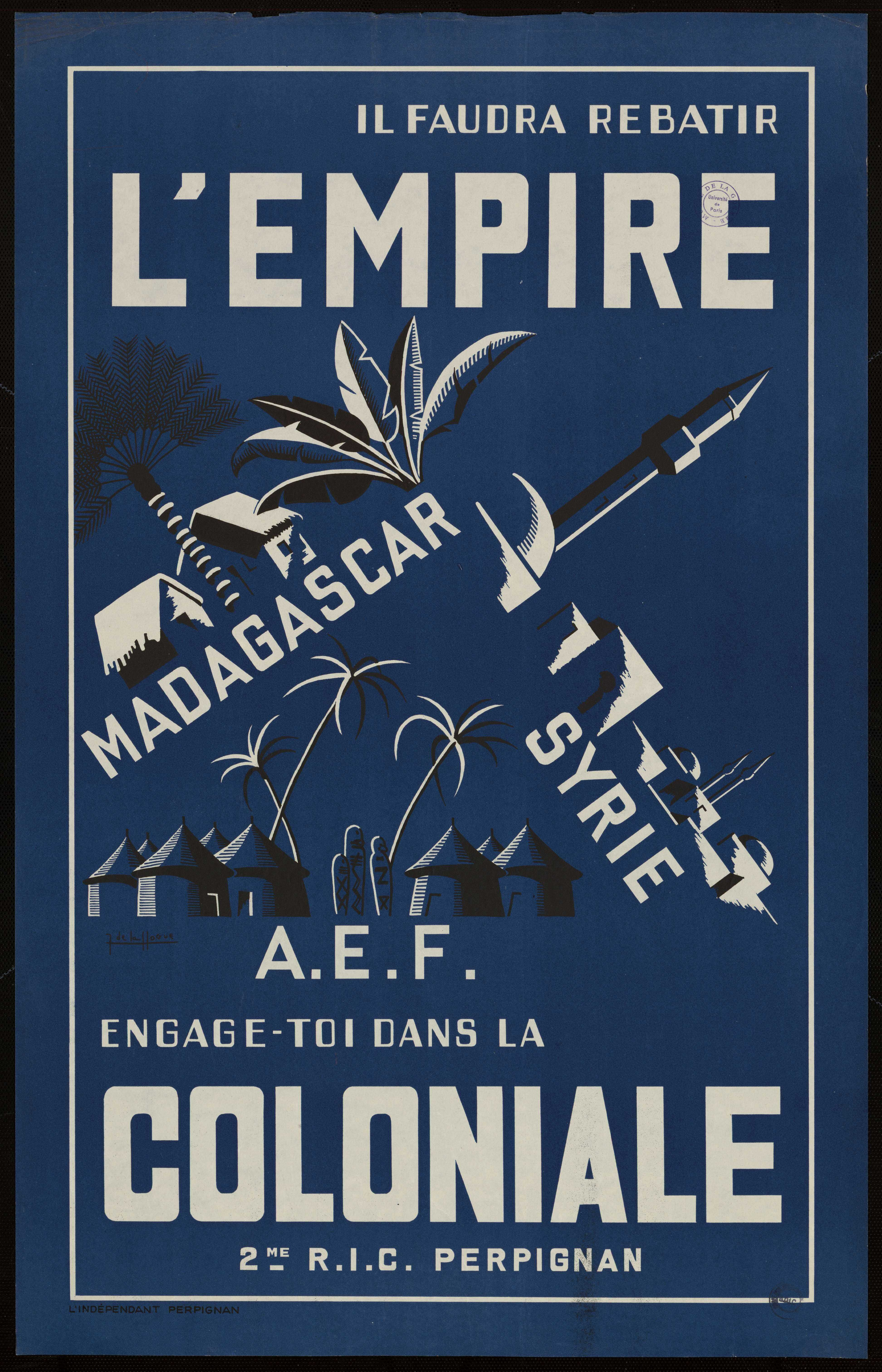
Vichy regime poster: "We must rebuild the empire: Madagascar, Syria, French Equatorial Africa. Enlist in La Coloniale."

The Troupes coloniales (French pronunciation: [tʁup kɔlɔnjal], "Colonial Troops") or Armée coloniale ([aʁme kɔlɔnjal],"Colonial Army"), commonly called La Coloniale, were the colonial troops of the French colonial empire from 1900 until 1961. From 1822 to 1900, these troops were designated as Troupes de marine ("Marine Troops" or just "Marines"), and in 1961 they readopted this name. They were recruited from mainland France and from the French settler population as well as indigenous populations of the empire. This force played a substantial role in the conquest of the empire, in World War I, World War II, the First Indochina War, and the Algerian War.

== Makeup of French Colonial Forces ==
The Armée coloniale should not be confused with the units of the French Army generally stationed in North Africa such as the Foreign Legion, the Zouave regiments, the Battalions of Light Infantry of Africa or the indigenous North African Spahis, Tirailleurs and Goumiers; all of which were part of the Army of Africa. The North African units date back to 1830 and were brought together as the XIX Army Corps in 1873, forming part of the French Metropolitan Army.

Instead the Troupes Coloniales can be divided into:

1. French long service volunteers (or until 1893 colonial settlers doing their military service) assigned to service in France itself or to garrisons in French West and Central Africa, Madagascar, New Caledonia or Indochina; and
2. Indigenous troops recruited in any of the above regions, serving under French officers. These were designated as Tirailleurs sénégalais, Tirailleurs malgaches, Tirailleurs indochinois, etc. according to the name of the colony of origin. Tirailleurs sénégalais was the name given to all West and Central African regiments, because Senegal was the first French colony south of the Sahara.

All colonial troops (la Coloniale or the Colonial) came under a single General Staff. The troupes coloniales were predominantly infantry but included artillery units as well as the usual support services. At various dates they also included locally recruited cavalry units in Indo-China as well as camel troops in sub-Saharan Africa. Across the French colonial possessions in 1914, a total of up to 25,000 native auxiliaries served as civil guards, militia or gendarmes. While officered and partially administered by the Colonial Army these para-military units did not serve outside their territories of recruitment.

On the eve of World War I the Troupes Coloniales consisted of 42,000 French regulars (of whom approximately 13,000 were posted overseas); plus 50,000 African and Indochinese indigenous troops.

Two companies of cipahis (sepoys) garrisoned Pondicherry and other French enclaves in British India. These were converted to gendarmerie in 1907 but returned to the Troupes Coloniales in 1921.

== Name changes ==
The precise meaning of the terms "colonial troops", "colonial army", marine troops or "troops of the French colonies" has changed several times since the 18th century:

- During the 18th and early 19th centuries "marine infantry" was the title used to identify French troops stationed permanently in France's various overseas territories.
- After the middle of the 19th century this term was extended to include the "native" troops recruited in the French colonies, excluding North Africa.
- The title "colonial troops" was adopted in 1900, when all the Marine Infantry and Marine Artillery troops that had previously come under the Ministry of the Navy were transferred to come under the orders of the War Department. In 1958 when France's African colonies had gained their independence, the mission and title of these troops was redefined. After a brief period as "Overseas Troops" (Troupes d'Outre-Mer) the traditional title of Marines was restored. The Marine regiments did however remain part of the French Army.

== List of regiments in New France 1755–59 ==
Colony troops:

- Compagnies Franches de la Marine

Regular regiments of the Royal Army assigned to colonial service:

- Régiment de La Reine
- Régiment d'Artois
- Régiment de La Sarre
- Royal-Roussillon
- Régiment de Bourgogne
- Régiment de Languedoc
- Régiment de Cambis
- Régiment de Guyenne
- Régiment de Berry
- Régiment de Béarn
- Régiment d'Angoumois
- Volontaires Etrangers
- Régiment Royal-Artillerie

== Uniforms ==
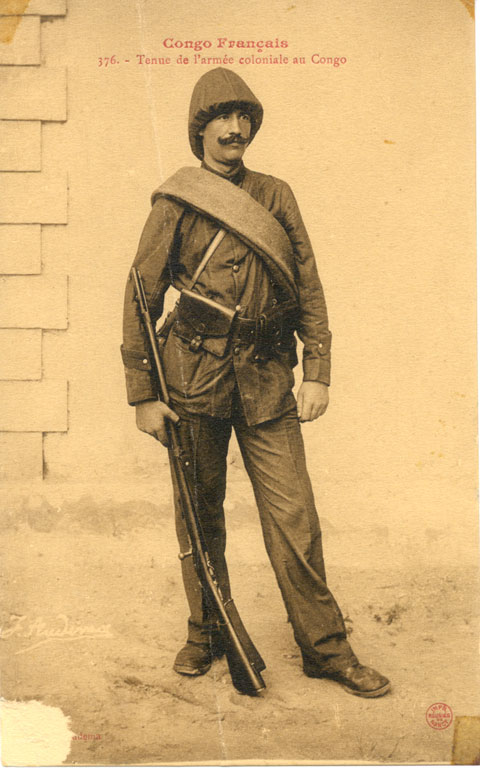
French Congo, c. 1905. Colonial Infantry bleu mecanicien field uniform.

The European Colonial Infantry and Colonial Artillery regiments were, until 1914, uniformed in a similar style to their metropolitan counterparts (although the former had yellow fringed epaulettes and medium blue trousers instead of the red epaulettes and red trousers of the line infantry). On colonial service white, dark blue or light khaki uniforms were worn with topees, according to circumstances. Between 1895 and 1905 a light blue/grey (bleu mecanicien) uniform was worn for field dress in Africa and Indo China (see photograph opposite).

From 1873 onwards, the Troupes Coloniales wore a double-breasted tunic, known as a paletot which was only worn by them. This garment was worn throughout the First World War, and is useful in positively identifying Troupes Coloniales in photographs, as specifically distinct from troops of the Metropolitan Army who did not wear this garment.

As with the rest of the army, they adopted horizon blue uniforms in 1915, subsequent to the notice of 9 December 1914. Towards the end of, and after, World War I khaki became the norm for all colonial troops in contrast to the horizon blue of the metropolitan conscripts. The blue dress uniform was however restored for French personnel who enlisted as volunteers in either the Colonial Infantry or Colonial Artillery, from 1928 to 1939.

Tirailleur regiments in Africa wore red fezes and sashes with dark blue, or khaki uniforms until 1914. The Indo-Chinese units wore a salacco headdress and blue, white or khaki drill clothing based on local patterns. After World War I khaki became the normal dress for indigenous troops, although sashes and fezzes continued to be worn for parade until the 1950s.

The modern Troupes de Marine are distinguished in full dress by dark blue kepis with red piping and bronze anchor badges, red sashes and yellow fringed epaulettes. These traditional items are worn with the standard light beige or camouflage dress of the modern French Army on ceremonial occasions.

== From Marines to Colonials and back again ==
From 1822 to 1900 these troops, both French and indigenous, had been designated as Troupes de Marine, though they were not directly linked to the French Navy. Both services were however administered by the Ministre de la Marine and shared an anchor badge. This insignia continued to be worn after the Troupes de la Marine became the Troupes Coloniales in 1900 and photographs of mehariste (camel corps) troopers taken in the 1950s show anchor badges even in the Mauritanian desert far from the sea. In 1961 the title of Troupes de Marine was readopted after a brief period (1958–61) as Troupes d'Outre-Mer (Overseas Forces).

== Post colonial period ==
As the remaining French African territories became independent in the late 1950s and early 1960s, the tirailleurs were discharged, usually to join their new national armies. In 1964, the 7th Regiment of Tirailleurs, formed in 1913 as the 7e Régiment de tirailleurs Algériens was redesigned the 170e Régiment d'Infanterie. The various "Tirailleurs Indochinois" regiments were dispersed by the Japanese coup of 10 March 1945 and were not reformed.

On 1 May 1994, in the presence of veterans of the armée d'Afrique, légionnaires, spahis, zouaves and artilleurs, the 170e Régiment d'Infanterie was redesignated as the 1er Régiment de Tirailleurs. It wears the insignia and bears the honors and traditions of the old 1er régiment de tirailleurs Algériens, which was disbanded in 1964.

== Status of colonial forces ==
Throughout their changing titles and roles the French Troupes de Marine or Troupes coloniales retained a reputation for toughness and professionalism. Whether French or indigenous they were, for the most part, long service regulars and as such comprised a genuine elite.

== Modern ==
The Marine Infantry, Marine Parachute, Artillery and Engineer units remain as a distinct branch within the modern French Army.

== See also ==
- Colonial and Marine Parachute Battalions
- Colonial troops
- Troupes de marine
- French Resistance
- Concentration camps in France
- Army of the Levant
- Army of Africa
- Tonkinese Rifles
- French colonial flags
- French Colonial Empire
- List of French possessions and colonies

== Bibliography ==
- Paul Jean Louis Azan, L'armée indigène nord-Africaine, Paris, Charles-Lavauzelle & cie., 1925.
- Charles John Balesi. From adversary to comrades-in-arms: West Africans and the French military, 1885-1919, Chicago, 1976.
- Louis Beausza, La formation de l'armee coloniale, Paris, L. Fournier et cie., 1939.
- Edward L Bimberg, Tricolor over the Sahara the desert battles of the Free French, 1940-1942, Westport, Conn.: Greenwood Press, 2002, ISBN 0-313-01097-8 or ISBN 978-0-313-01097-2.
- Chartrand, René (2018). French Naval & Colonial Troops 1872–1914. Men-at-Arms. London: Osprey. ISBN 978-1-47-282619-0.
- Clayton, Anthony (1988). France, Soldiers and Africa. Washington: Brassey's Inc. ISBN 978-0-08-034748-6.
- Clayton, Anthony (1994). Histoire de l'Armée française en Afrique 1830-1962 (in French). Paris: Albin Michel. ISBN 978-2-28-600869-7.
- Crocé, Eliane; Lefevre, Eric; Mabire, Ingrid (1986). Les Troupes de Marine 1622-1984 (in French). Paris: Charles-Lavauzelle. ISBN 978-2-70-250142-9.
- Shelby Cullom Davis, Reservoirs of men: a history of the Black troops of French West Africa, Westport, Conn., Negro Universities Press, 1970, ISBN 0-8371-3776-4 or ISBN 978-0-8371-3776-6.
- Richard Standish Fogarty, Race and war in France: colonial subjects in the French Army, 1914-1918, Baltimore: Johns Hopkins University Press, 2008, ISBN 978-0-8018-8824-3 or ISBN 0-8018-8824-7.
- Huré, Robert, ed. (1977). L'Armée d'Afrique : 1830-1962. Paris: Charles-Lavauzelle. OCLC 757208988.
- Jouineau, André (2009a) [2008]. Officiers et soldats de l'armée française Tome 1 : 1914 [Officers and Soldiers of the French Army Volume I: 1914]. Officers and Soldiers #11. Translated by McKay, Alan. Paris: Histoire & Collections. ISBN 978-2-35250-104-6.
- Jouineau, André (2009b) [2009]. Officiers et soldats de l'armée française Tome 2 : 1915-1918 [Officers and Soldiers of the French Army Volume II: 1915-18]. Officers and Soldiers #12. Translated by McKay, Alan. Paris: Histoire & Collections. ISBN 978-2-35250-105-3.
- Nancy Ellen Lawler, Soldiers of misfortune: Ivoirien tirailleurs of World War II, Athens: Ohio University Press, 1992, ISBN 0-8214-1012-1 or ISBN 978-0-8214-1012-7.
- Maria Petringa, Brazza, A Life for Africa, Bloomington, IN: AuthorHouse, 2006. ISBN 978-1-4259-1198-0
- Philippi, Didier; Roudier, Philippe, eds. (2020). L'histoire des Troupes de Marine au travers de l'uniforme 1622-2020 (in French). Un préface par Frédéric Garnier. Paris: Histoire & Collections. ISBN 979-10-380-1001-7.
- Marcel Vigneras, Rearming the French, Office of the Chief of Military History, Dept. of the Army, 1957
- Annuaire officiel des troupes coloniales, Paris: Charles-Lavauzelle, (serial)
- Histoire et épopée des Troupes coloniales, Paris, Presses Modernes, 1956.
- CEHD (Centre d'Etudes d'Histoire de la Défense), Les troupes de Marine dans l’armée de Terre. Un siècle d’histoire (1900–2000), Paris, Lavauzelle, 2001, 444 p., ISBN 2-7025-0492-2
- Troupes coloniales. Organisation générale, Paris: H. Charles-Lavauzelle, 1907?
- Historique des troupes coloniales pendant la guerre 1914-1918 (fronts extérieurs), Paris: Charles-Lavauzelle & Cie., 1931.
- Historique des Troupes Coloniales pendant la Guerre 1914 - 1918 2, Paris Charles-Lavauzelle & Cie. 1931.
- United States. Dept. of State. Colored troops in the French Army: a report from the Department of State relating to the colored troops in the French Army and the number of French colonial troops in the occupied territory, Washington, D.C.: G.P.O., 1921.
- Ministère de la guerre.,Troupes coloniales. Organisation génerale, Paris: Charles-Lavauzelle & cie., 1937.

=== Journals ===
- Kim Munholland, The emergence of the colonial military in France, 1880–1905, Ph.D. thesis, Princeton University, 1964.

=== Audio-visual media ===
- Alain de Sédouy; Eric Deroo, The forgotten history: The native Senegalese infantry, The Indochinese paratroops, The Moroccan Goumiers: a series of three documentaries Paris: GMT Productions: France 3, 1992.
