= Guyenne Regiment =

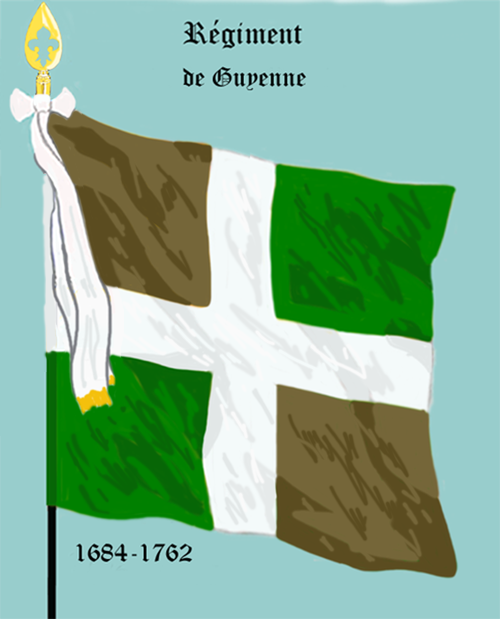
Régiment de Guyenne (1684-1762)

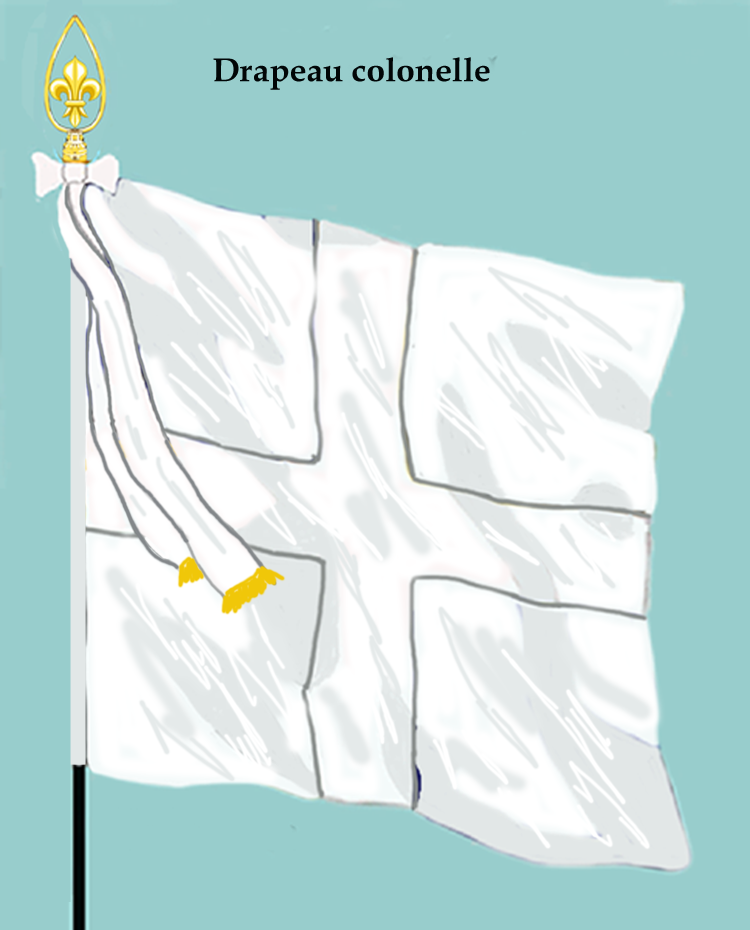
The Colonels colors

The Régiment de Guyenne was a French Army infantry regiment in the 18th century. It is principally known for its role in the Seven Years' War, when it served in the North American theatre.

== History ==
The regiment was recruited from the Bordeaux region of France. They arrived in America on June 23, 1755, upon arriving were sent to Fort Frontenac and then to Fort Niagara. In February 1756, some of the soldiers participated in the taking of Fort Bull, cutting the communication between Lake George and Fort Oswego. The regiment participated in many battles: that of Fort Oswego in August 1756 and that of William Henry in 1757. The regiment fought at the Battle of Carillon in 1758, and spent the rest of the year and winter at Fort Carillon. In March 1759, part of the regiment was sent to Fort Niagara, some others at Isle aux Noix, and the remainder of the regiment towards Quebec City to defend the city. They took part at the battle of Montmorency, that of the Plains of Abraham on September 13, 1759 (placed at the center of the attacking lines), and the Battle of Sainte-Foy in 1760.

The uniform of the regiment was a bit like that of the Régiment de la Reine: a white-grey coat with red reversed sleeves with three ornate buttons: red vest, white-grey pants; black shoes with metallic buckles. However, contrary to La Reine, the tricorne was black felt with a gold galon.

Uniforms

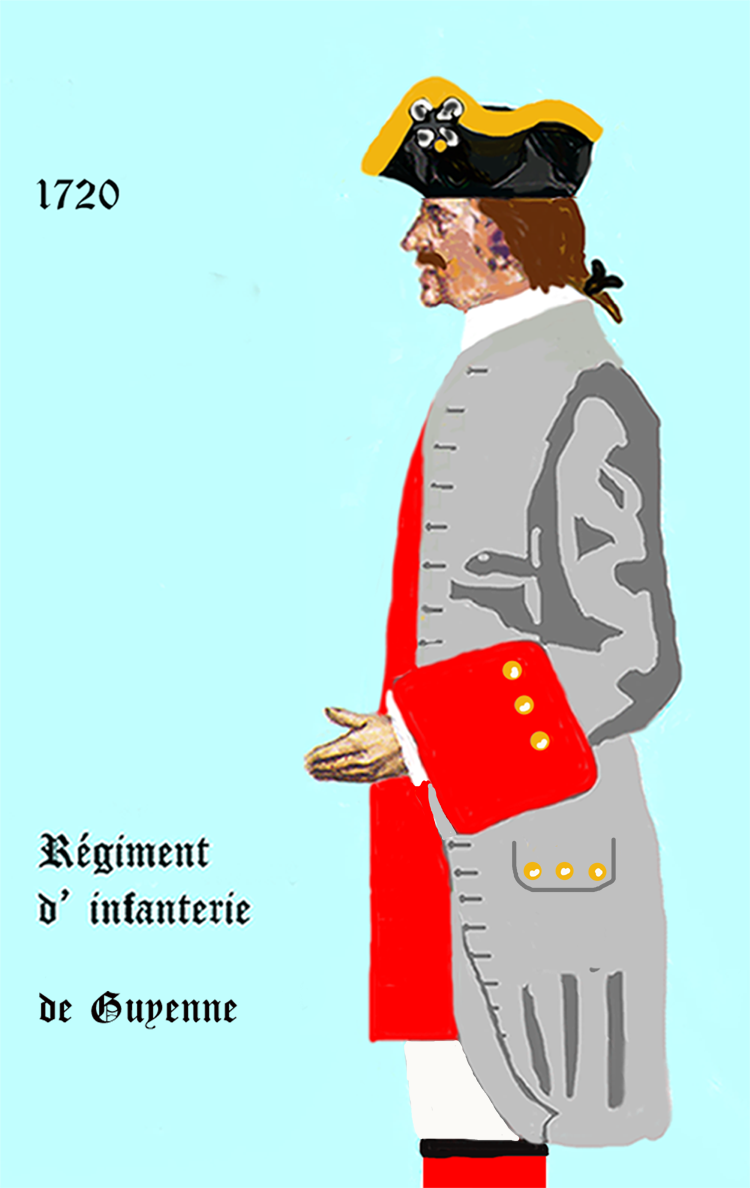
Régiment de Guyenne 1720 - 1734

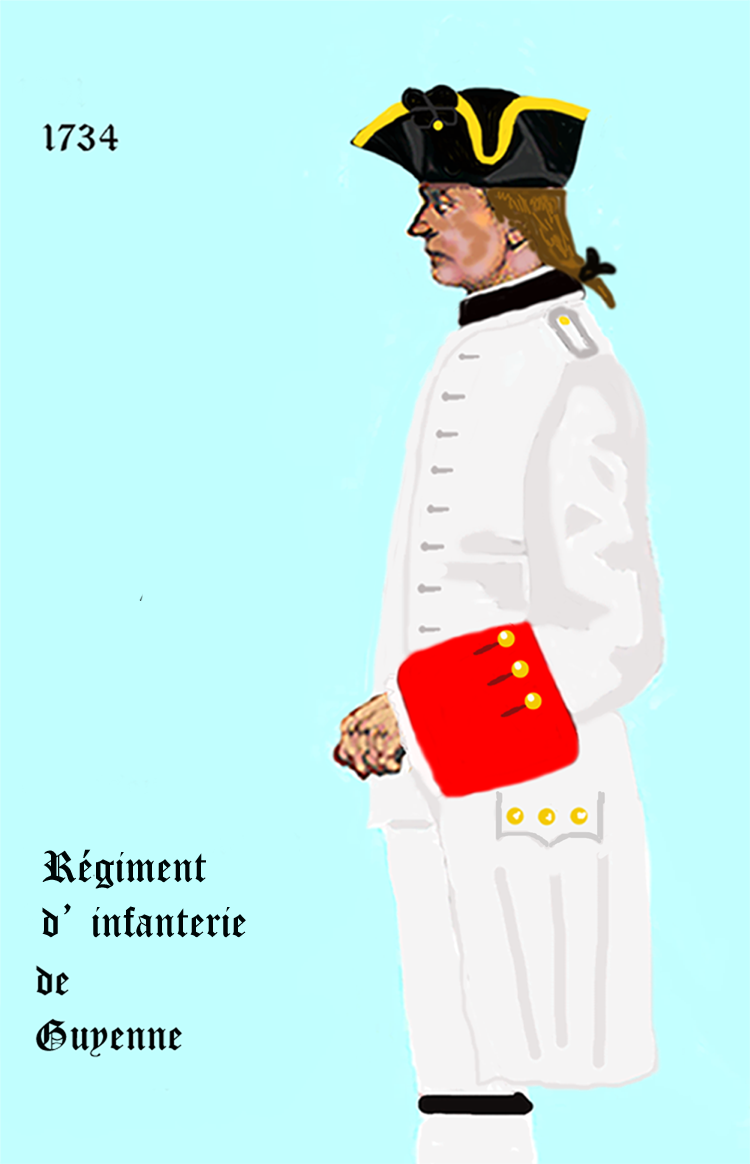
Régiment de Guyenne 1734 - 1757

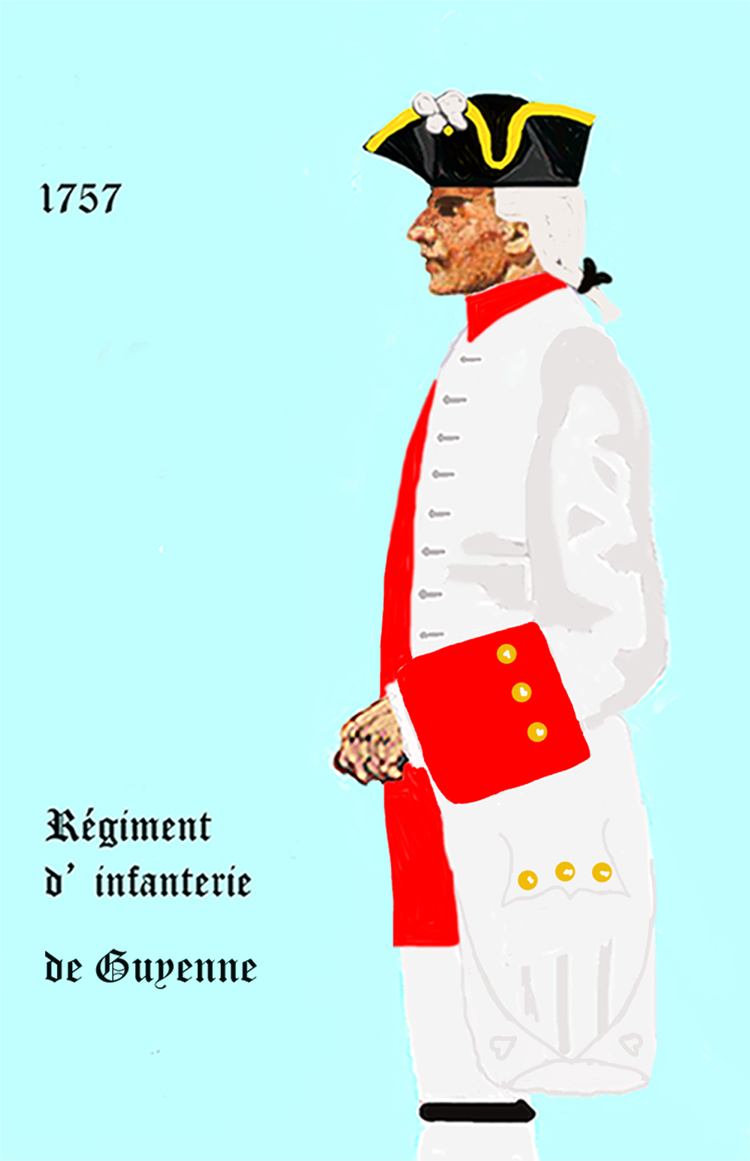
Régiment de Guyenne 1757 - 1762

== See also ==
- Military of New France
