= La Sarre Regiment =

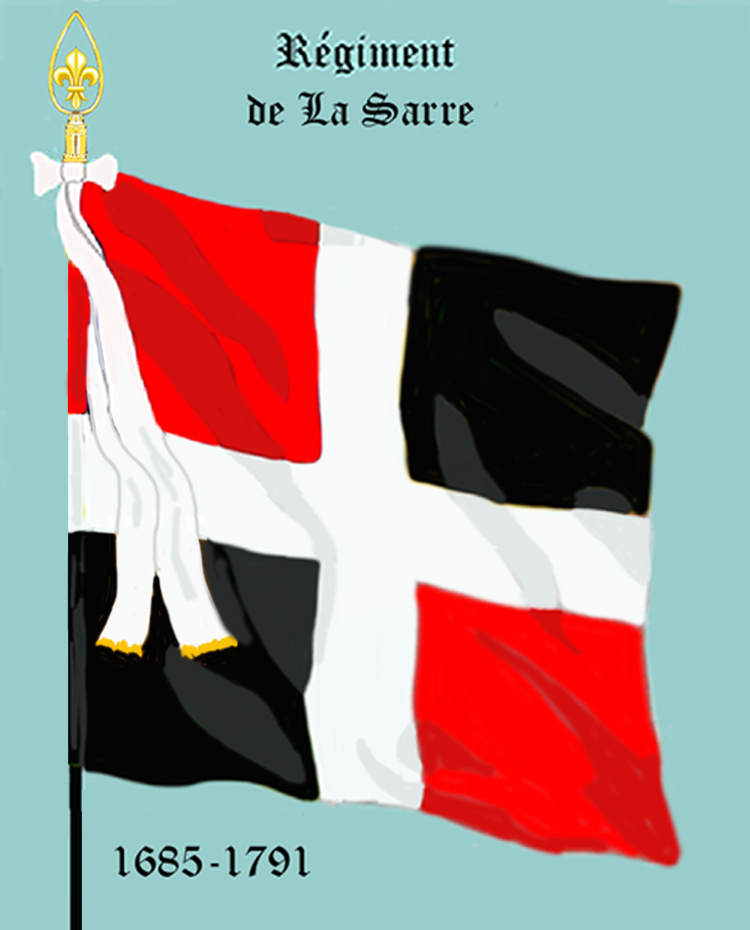
Régiment de la Sarre

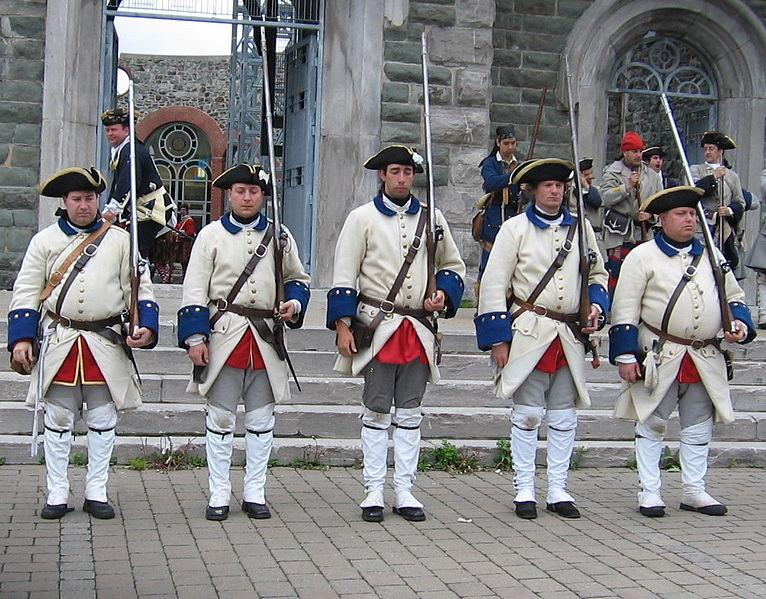
Régiment de la Sarre

The La Sarre Regiment (French: Régiment de la Sarre, pronounced [ʁeʒimɑ̃ də la saʁ]) was a French Army regiment active in the 18th century. It is principally known for its role in the Seven Years' War during which it served in the French and Indian War.

== History ==
The Regiment was recruited in the French region of Lorraine. After recruitment, most of the Regiment left from Brest, France, aboard a few French ships such as Le Héros and Le Léopard. The last of the men would arrive in Quebec City on 31 May 1756. They took part in the Capture of Fort Oswego in August of that same year and then escorted the British prisoners to Montreal after the battle. The Regiment played a key role in the victory at Fort Oswego and lost seven men in the process.

In August 1757, many soldiers of the Regiment participated in the victory at Fort William Henry. At Fort William Henry, the Regiment contributed 800-900 men of the roughly 5000 who fought in the battle itself. The fort capitulated before the regiment had a chance to launch a full on assault. The regiment then served under Louis-Joseph de Montcalm in 1758 at the Battle of Carillon. The victory was absolutely decisive for the French by crippling a much larger British force. The Regiment also played a significant role. The Regiment was commanded by de Savournin during the battle. During the battle, the La Salle Regiment took up the left flank along with the Languedoc Regiment. The La Salle Regiment lost a number of captains during the battle and perhaps took the heaviest French losses during the bloodiest and largest French victory of the war in North America. The Regiment then participated in the Battles of Montmorency, Plains of Abraham, and Sainte-Foy.

The Battle of Montmorency was another French victory in which the Regiment took part. Le Noir, a captain in the regiment, was noted to be extremely brave in this battle in particular. He lost half of his men and was shot, and still managed to survive. The next battle in which La Sarre took part was the decisive British victory at the Planes of Abraham. About 50 men were either injured or killed from the regiment during the battle. The final North American battle in which the regiment would take part was the Battle of Sainte-Foy. It was another victory for the French and the Regiment but was inconsequential to the outcome of the war. The Regiment lined up on the left flank of the French lines. There were signs of retreat on the left, but the Regiment fought bravely and held off the British forces for half an hour until the rest of the French Army came to its aid. Eventually, the Regiment, with the help of the rest of the French Army, managed to push the enemy off the battlefield.

After the Battle of Sainte-Foy, the Regiment took part in a half-hearted Siege of Quebec City. On 16 May, the regiment was forced to lift the siege because of British reinforcements. In the following months, the French were on a constant retreat and could not fend off the British three-pronged attack on Montreal. The Regiment took a few casualties along the way. A stray cannon shot took off a soldier's arm as well. The Regiment was then charged to entrench on the nearby Île Bourbon, but that was short-lived.

Eventually, the Regiment met the same fate as the rest of the French presence in Canada. It was placed on British boats returning to France. On 15 September, the Regiment would leave Canada, never to return. Of the 31 officers in the Regiment, 11 were killed and the rest were at some point injured. The Regiment met again in 1763 and was deployed in various European campaigns.

== See also ==
- Military of New France
