= François-Charles de Bourlamaque =

French colonial governor and general (1716–1764)

Governor of Guadeloupe
- In office 4 July 1763 – 24 June 1764
- Monarch: Louis XV
- Governor General: Pierre de Rigaud
- Prime Minister: Étienne François de Choiseul
- Preceded by: Campbell Dalrymple
- Succeeded by: Henri Édouard de Copley

Personal details
- Born: 1716 Paris, France
- Died: 1764 (aged 47–48)
- Occupation: Army officer, Colonial Administrator

Military service
- Allegiance: France; New France; (New France) Canada
- Years of service: 1739–1764
- Rank: Major general
- Battles/wars: Seven Years' War; French and Indian War; Siege of Fort William Henry; Battle of Carillon; Battle of Ticonderoga (1759); St. Francis raid; Montreal campaign

François-Charles de Bourlamaque (also spelled Burlamaqui) was a French military leader and Governor of Guadeloupe from 1763 until his death in 1764.

== Biography ==
François-Charles de Bourlamaque was born in Paris in 1716; he was the son of Francesco Burlamacchi, who was born in Lucca, Tuscany, who was a captain of grenadiers and was killed in the Battle of San Pietro in 1734. He volunteered for the Régiment du Dauphin, the same regiment his father served in, in 1739, and by 1745 was a captain. He was sent to Canada in 1756 as third-in-command of the regular troops and served with distinction throughout the subsequent campaign in Canada. In the Battle of Carillon in 1758 he commanded the French left, and in 1759 led the French forces at Ticonderoga and was made a Brigadier-General. Around September 1759, he reflected that "few Canadians I have here; [they] still show no ill will; but I fear that by learning of the good treatment that the English give to their families, they do not decamp to join them".

The following year he, with a small force, attempted to defend the area around Trois-Rivières during the British thrust on Montreal, but to no avail. After the French capitulation he became a Major-General in 1762 and Maréchal de camp in February 1763. He was given the governorship of Guadeloupe at the same time.

== Bibliography ==
- W. Stewart WALLACE, ed., The Encyclopedia of Canada, vol. I, Toronto, University Associates of Canada, 1948, p. 272
