= Duke of Berry's Regiment =

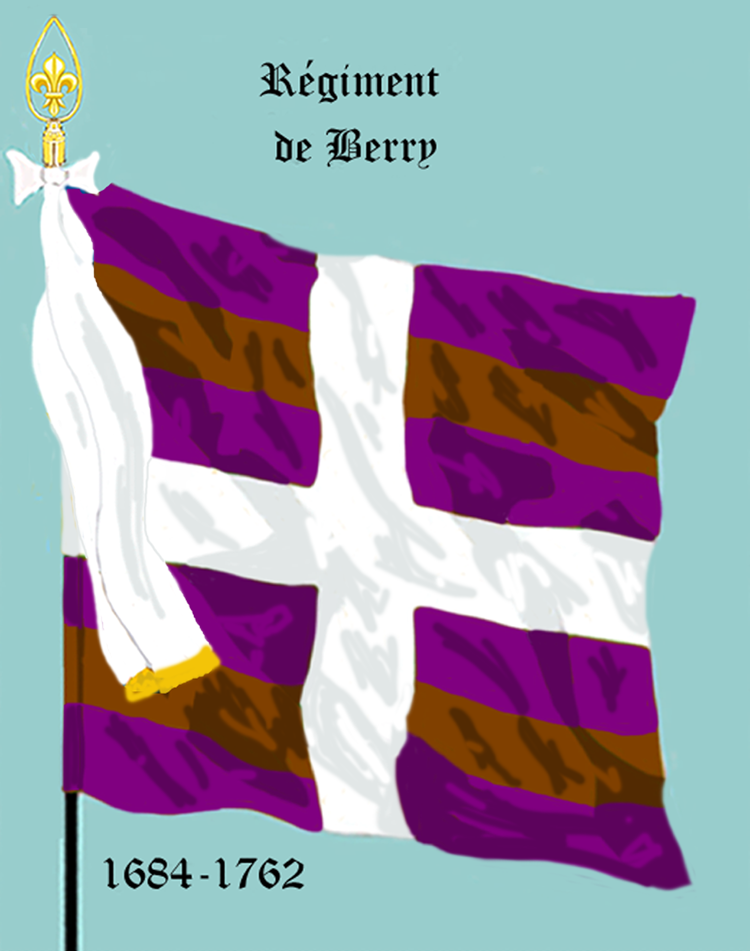
Régiment de Berry (1684-1762)

The Régiment de Berry was a French Army regiment active in the 18th century. It is principally known for its role in the Seven Years' War, when it served in the North American theatre.

== History ==
The regiment was recruited from the Berry region of France. In the beginning, the second and third battalions of the regiment were supposed to be sent to India. However, at the request of reinforcements asked by Louis-Joseph de Montcalm and New France's Governor Vaudreuil, the regiment was instead sent to New France. The regiment arrived at the end of July 1757. The two battalions were initially posted in Quebec City. In 1758, the whole regiment was sent to Fort Carillon, and contributed in the victory in the Battle of Carillon. At the end of August, the regiment, which had 908 soldiers, now only has 723 men because of the consecutive battles which ensued and were fatal for many of them. The regiment was not sent to Quebec for the Battle of the Plains of Abraham, but remained at Fort Carillon in 1759. They did however participate at the Battle of Sainte-Foy in 1760. At the subsequent siege of Quebec they were unable to subdue the British and had to retreat to Montreal. They could not fend off the three pronged British attack against Montréal in September and surrendered there.

== See also ==
- Military of New France
