= Queen's Regiment (France) =

- Régiment de la Reine
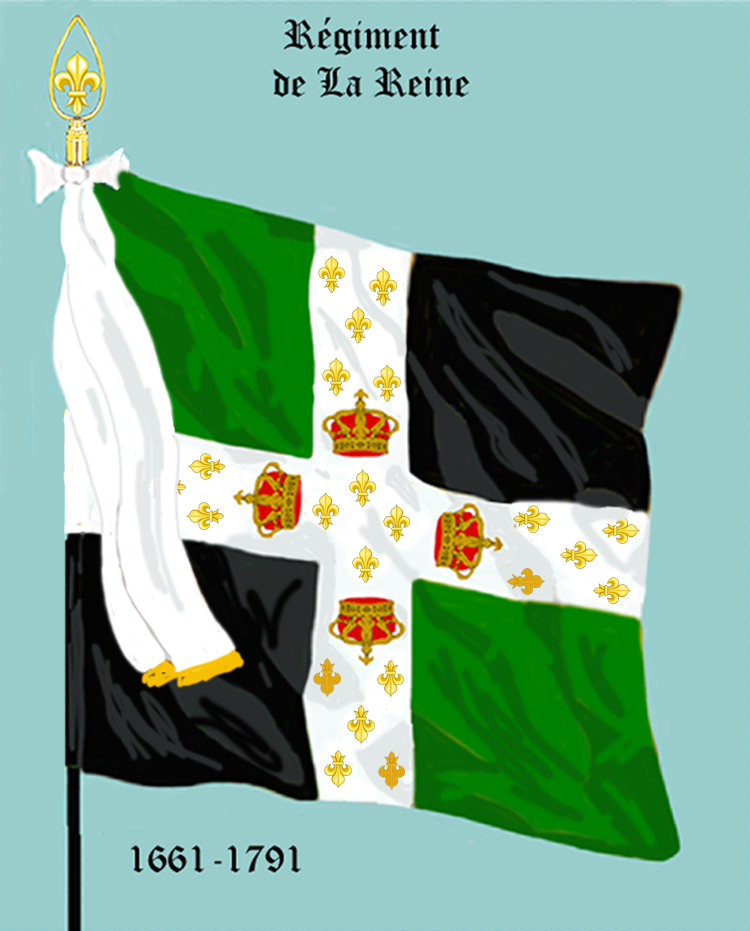
- Active: 1661–1791; 1815–1816
- Country: Kingdom of France
- Branch: Royal French Army
- Type: Line Infantry
- Role: Infantry
- Engagements: Seven Years' War: Battle of Fort Bull; Siege of Fort William Henry; Battle of Carillon; Siege of Quebec; Battle of Sainte-Foy; Montreal Campaign

The Régiment de la Reine (French pronunciation: [ʁeʒimɑ̃ də la ʁɛn], Queen's Regiment) was a French Army infantry regiment active in the 17th and 18th centuries. It is principally known for its role in the Seven Years' War, when it served in the North American theatre.

== Early history ==
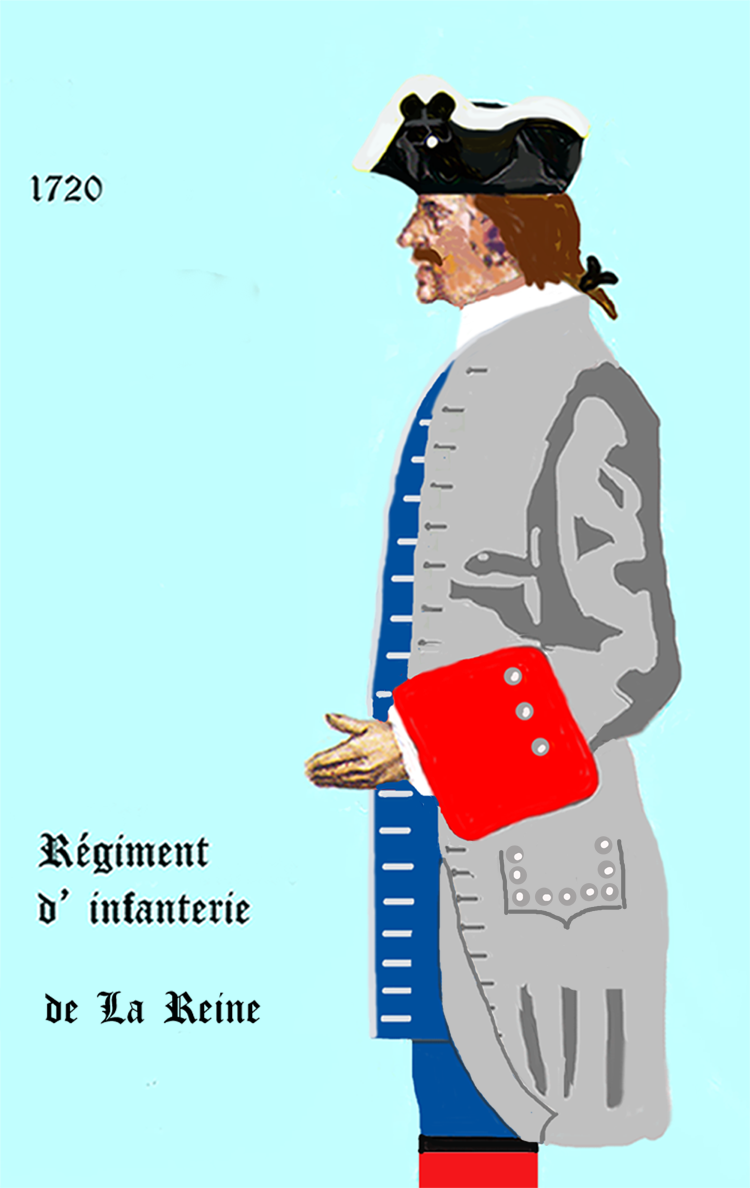
Uniform of the Régiment de la Reine, c.1720

The Régiment de la Reine traced its origin to the Mazarin Français Regiment, which in 1661 was named Régiment de la reine mère (Regiment of the Queen Mother) by Louis XIV as part of a general reorganisation of the French Army. Following the death of Louis' mother Anne of Austria in 1666, the regiment was renamed as the Régiment de la Reine.

== Seven Years War ==
During the Seven Years' War, a battalion of the regiment took part in several battles including Fort Saint Frédéric on Lake George (September 1755), and the taking of Fort Bull and Fort William-Henry. Their greatest victory came at Fort Carillon in 1758 against the forces of General Abercromby. They were then sent to Isle aux Noix in July of that same year, and were absent from the Battle of the Plains of Abraham the following year. However, they did take part at the Battle of Sainte-Foy in 1760, where the British under General Murray were defeated. At the subsequent siege of Quebec they were unable to subdue the British and had to retreat to Montreal in May. They could not fend off the British three pronged attack against Montréal in September and surrendered there.

== Subsequent history ==
In 1791 the regiment became the 41st Regiment of Line Infantry when the former titles of the Royal Army were abolished. With the restoration of the Monarchy in 1815 the 2nd Regiment of Line Infantry was renamed as the Régiment de la Reine. In the course of a general restructuring of the army in 1816, this traditional title was finally discarded.

== Uniform ==
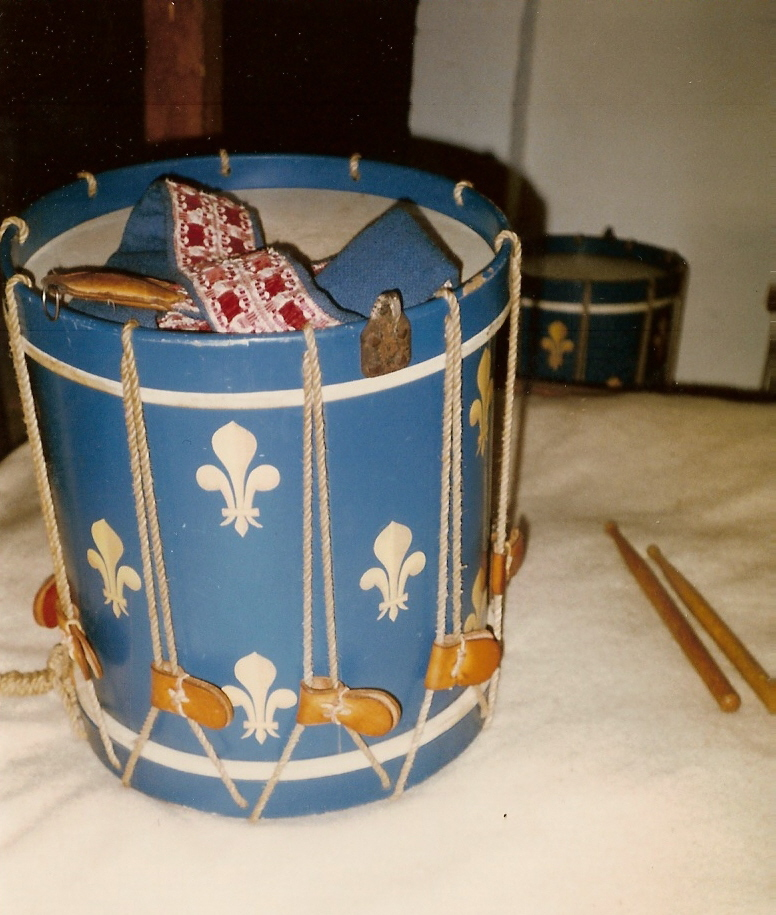
Régiment de la Reine drum

Throughout most of the 18th century the regiment's coat was white (originally the grey-white of non-dyed wool), with a blue waistcoat underneath, without turnbacks or a collar, and with pewter buttons. Facings were red (on the cuffs only). Canadian troops wore the same, except with a red waistcoat. Both fusiliers and grenadiers wore black tricorns laced white. As part of the reorganisations of 1791 the regimental facings were changed to sky-blue

== Régiment de la reine dragons ==
A mounted regiment the Régiment de la reine dragons (Queen's Dragoons), was raised in 1673, named like its infantry counterpart in honour of the queen consort Marie-Thérèse of Spain. In 1791 it became the 6th Dragoon Regiment.

== See also ==
- Fort Carillon
- Military of New France
