= Rogers' Rangers =

British Army unit (1755–1796)

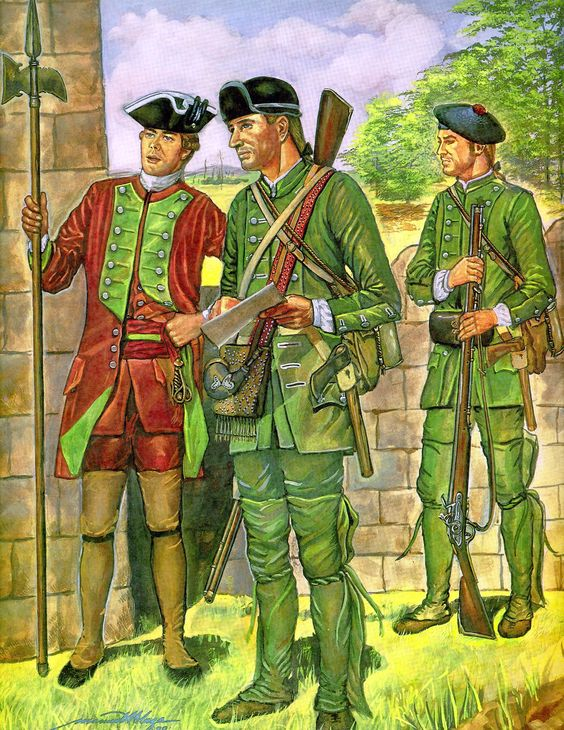
- Two soldiers of the unit conferring with a British Army sergeant in New York in 1760
- Active: 1755–1796
- Country: Great Britain
- Allegiance: Kingdom of Great Britain (1775-1796); New England Colonies (1755–1775)
- Branch: British Army: British provincial unit
- Type: Special operations Auxiliaries
- Role: Special operations Maneuver warfare Guerrilla warfare Skirmishing
- Size: Nine companies (in the regiment)
- Garrison/HQ: Fort William Henry (1755–1757); Rogers Island (1757–1763) Fort Detroit (1763-1796)
- Engagements: French and Indian War: Battle on Snowshoes (1757); Siege of Fort William Henry (1757); Battle on Snowshoes (1758); Siege of Louisbourg (1758); Battle of Carillon (1758); Ile Saint-Jean Campaign (1758); Petitcodiac River Campaign (1758); Cape Sable Campaign (1758); St. John River Campaign (1759); Battle of Ticonderoga (1759); St. Francis Raid (1759); Sainte-Thérèse Raid (1760); Montreal Campaign (1760); Pontiac's War (1763–1766): Devil's Hole Massacre (1763)

Commanders
- Notable commanders: Lieutenant Colonel Robert Rogers; Lieutenant Colonel James Rogers; Captain William Stark; Lieutenant John Stark

Rogers' Rangers was a company of soldiers from the Province of New Hampshire raised by Major Robert Rogers and attached to the British Army during the French and Indian War. The unit was quickly adopted into the New England Colonies army as an independent ranger company. Rogers was inspired by colonial Frontiersman Ranger groups across North America and the teachings of unconventional warfare from Rangers such as Benjamin Church.

Rogers trained and commanded his own rapidly deployable light infantry force, which was tasked mainly with reconnaissance and conducting special operations against distant targets. Their tactics were built on earlier Colonial precedents and were codified for the first time by Rogers as his 28 "Rules of Ranging". The tactics proved remarkably effective, and the initial company was expanded into a ranging corps of more than a dozen companies containing as many as 1,200–1,400 men at its peak. The ranger corps became the chief scouting arm of British Crown forces by the late 1750s. The British forces in America valued Rogers' Rangers for their ability to gather intelligence about the enemy. They were disbanded in 1761.

Later, the company was revived as a Loyalist force during the American Revolutionary War. Nonetheless, a number of former ranger officers fought for the Continental Army as Patriot commanders with some participating as militiamen at the Battle of Concord Bridge. The Queen's York Rangers (1st American Regiment) of the Canadian Army was formed by Rogers and Loyalist veterans of Rogers' Rangers and claims descent from Rogers' Rangers.

== French and Indian War ==
Rogers' Rangers began in 1755 as a company in the provincial forces of the colony of New Hampshire in British North America. It was one of a long line of New England ranger companies dating back to the 1670s. The immediate precursor and model for the unit was Gorham's Rangers, formed in 1744. Both ranger units were active throughout the French and Indian War, most notably at the Siege of Louisburg in 1758 and the Siege of Quebec in 1759.

Rogers' company was formed to fight in the French and Indian War (part of the Seven Years' War in Europe) in the borderlands of the colonial Northeast. They were commanded by Captain Robert Rogers and operated primarily in the Lake George and Lake Champlain regions in the Province of New York. The unit was formed during the winter of 1755 from forces stationed at Fort William Henry. The Rangers sometimes undertook raids against French towns and military emplacements, traveling on foot, in whaleboats, and even on snowshoes during winter. Israel Putnam fought as a Connecticut militia captain in conjunction with Rogers, and saved his life on one occasion.

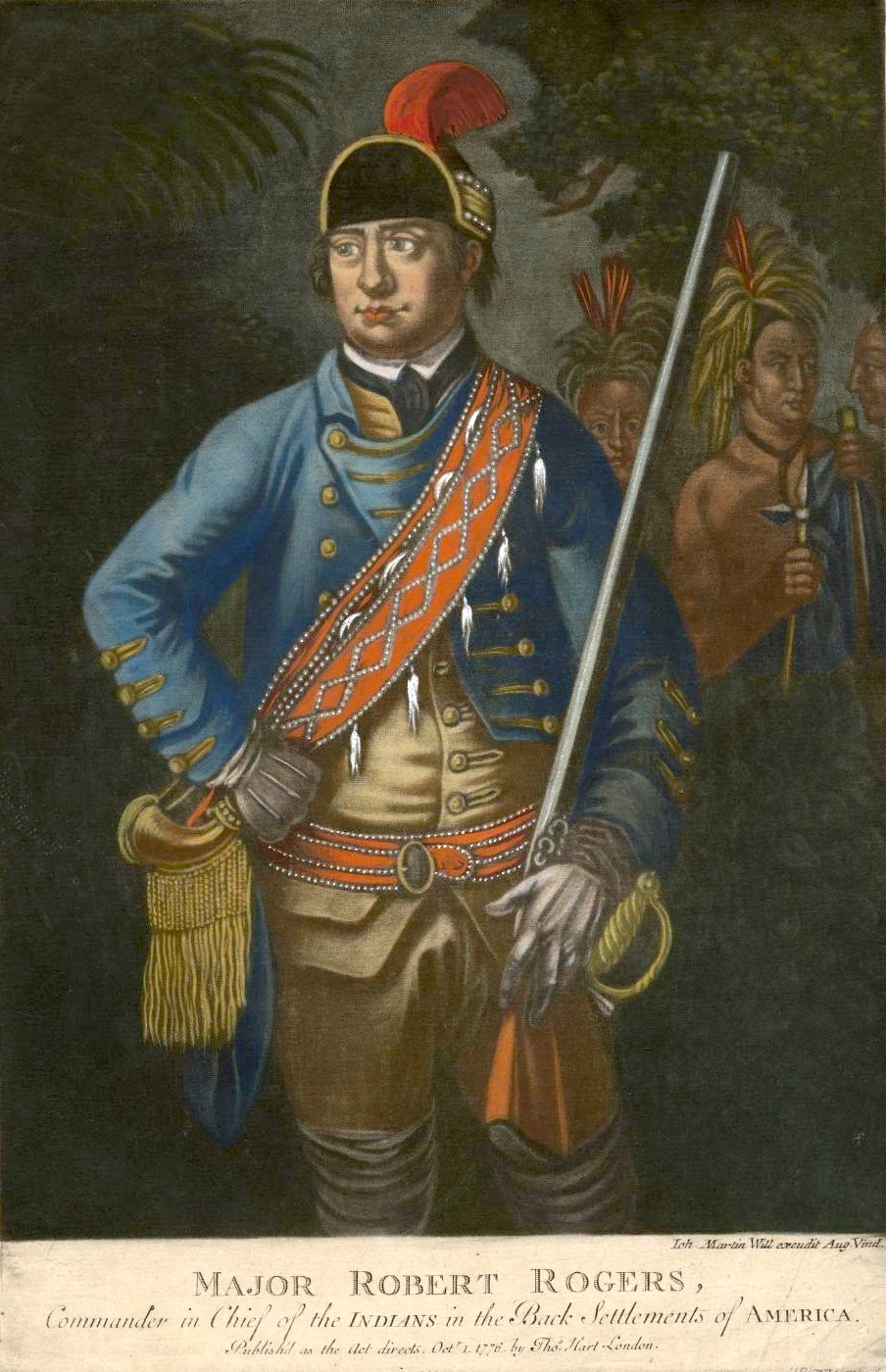
Robert Rogers, the founding leader and namesake of Rogers' Rangers in a 1776 painting

The usefulness of Rogers' company during 1756 and 1757 prompted the British to form a second ranger company, which was soon followed by more. By early 1758, the rangers had been expanded to a corps of 14 companies, each composed of 1,200 to 1,400 men. This included three all-Indian units, two of Stockbridge Mahicans, and one of Mohegan Indians from Connecticut. Rogers was then promoted to major and served as commandant of the Ranger Corps.

=== First Battle on Snowshoes ===
On January 21, 1757, during the First Battle on Snowshoes, Rogers led 74 rangers to ambush the French, capturing seven prisoners near Fort Carillon at the south end of Lake Champlain. They then were attacked by about 100 French and Canadien (French Canadian) militia and their Ottawa allies from the Ohio Country. Rogers' men suffered casualties and retreated without further losses, since the French lacked snowshoes and were "floundering in snow up to their knees." Rogers' Rangers had maintained positions on the high ground and behind large trees. According to Francis Parkman, Ranger casualties were 14 killed, 6 captured, and 6 wounded, the wounded returning with 48 men who were unharmed. The French consisted of 89 Regulars and 90 Canadians and Indians; they had 37 killed and wounded. The French and Indian casualties may have included one of the captured prisoners. One wounded and captured Ranger who was later exchanged claimed to have killed one of the captured Frenchmen by striking him on the head with a tomahawk after the Rangers were ambushed. It is unclear if this was the fate of the other captured French as well.

A company of the rangers led by Noah Johnson was stationed at Fort William Henry in 1757 during the siege. The siege ended with the surrender and massacre of the British forces in August. After this, the Rangers were stationed on Rogers Island near Fort Edward. This allowed them to train and operate with more freedom than the regular forces.

=== Second Battle on Snowshoes ===
On March 13, 1758, at the Second Battle on Snowshoes, Rogers' Rangers ambushed a French-Indian column and were then ambushed in turn by enemy forces. The Rangers lost 125 men in this encounter, as well as eight men wounded, with 52 surviving. One reference reports casualties of the Regulars, who had volunteered to accompany the Rangers, as 2 captured and 5 killed. Of Rogers' Rangers, 78 were captured and 47 killed and missing (of whom 19 were captured). Rogers estimated 100 killed and nearly 100 wounded of the French-Indian forces. The French, however, reported their casualties as just 10 Indians killed and 17 wounded, and three Canadians wounded.

The French originally reported killing Rogers in the second battle. This was based on their finding some of his belongings, including his regimental coat containing his military commission; however, he had escaped. This episode gave rise to the legend of Rogers' sliding 400 feet (120 m) down the side of a mountain to the frozen surface of Lake George. There is no conclusive proof this actually happened, but the rock face is still known as "Rogers' Slide" or "Rogers Rock".

=== Siege of Louisbourg ===
Four companies of Rogers Rangers (500 rangers) arrived on the provincial vessel King George and were at Dartmouth, Nova Scotia from April 8 until May 28, awaiting the Siege of Louisbourg (1758). While there, they scoured the woods to stop raids on the capital. During the Siege, the rangers were the first to go ashore at Freshwater Cover and encountered 100 Mi'kmaq and French soldiers. James Wolfe and Scott followed up the rangers. The Rangers killed and scalped the Chief Mi'kmaq. In their retreat, the rangers captured 70 defenders and killed more than 50. Historian Burt Loescher describes this as "one of the most admirable feats ever performed by a detachment of the Corps."

=== Carillon and Crown Point ===
On July 7–8, 1758, Rogers' Rangers took part in the Battle of Carillon. On July 27, 1758, 300 Indians and 200 French Canadians under Captain St. Luc ambushed a British convoy between Fort Edward and Half-Way Brook. The British lost 116 killed (including 16 Rangers) and 60 captured.

On August 8, 1758, a British force of Rangers, light infantry, and provincials was ambushed near Crown Point, New York by a French and Indian force of 450 under Captain Marin. Major Israel Putnam was captured, but he was reportedly saved from being burned at the stake by the Abenaki through the intervention of a French officer. Francis Parkman reported 49 British fatalities and "more than a hundred" killed of the enemy. Rogers claimed that the British lost 33 and the enemy lost 199. Another source reports that the French casualties were four Indians and six Canadians killed, and four Indians and six Canadians wounded, including an officer and a cadet.

=== Raid on Saint-Francis ===
During 1759, the Rangers were involved in one of their most famous operations, the St. Francis Raid. They had been ordered to destroy the Abenaki settlement of Saint-Francis in Quebec. It was the base of the raids and attacks on British settlements. Rogers led a force of 200 Rangers from Crown Point deep into French territory. Following the October 3, 1759 attack and successful destruction of Saint-Francis, Rogers' force ran out of food on their retreat through the wilderness of northern New England. They reached a safe location along the Connecticut River at the abandoned Fort Wentworth, where Rogers left them encamped. He returned a few days later with food and relief forces from Fort at Number 4 (now Charlestown, New Hampshire), the nearest British outpost.

In the raid on Saint-Francis, Rogers claimed 200 enemies had been killed, leaving 20 women and children to be taken prisoner; he took five children as captives and released the rest. The French recorded 30 deaths, including 20 women and children. According to Francis Parkman, Ranger casualties in the attack were one killed and six wounded; in the retreat, five were captured from one band of Rangers, and nearly all in another party of about 20 Rangers were killed or captured. One source alleges that only about 100 returned of about 204 Rangers, allies, and observers.

=== Raid on Sainte-Thérèse ===
In the Spring of 1760 the Rangers joined in Amherst's campaign on Montreal but before doing so conducted a successful preemptive raid on Fort Sainte Thérèse which was used to supply the French army as well as being a vital link in the communication and supply line between Fort Saint-Jean and the French forces at Île aux Noix. The settlement and fort were then burned by Rogers following which French and Indian ambushes were repelled before their return to Crown Point with only minor losses.

=== Montreal Campaign ===
Roger's Rangers were part of William Haviland's force who marched from Lake Ontario in the west along the St Lawrence River and from upper New York via the Richelieu River in August. Along the way the Rangers fought to reduce the fortified French island of Île aux Noix. During the bombardment of the island Haviland sent Rogers' four ranger companies as well as light infantry and a force of Indians to drag three cannon through the forest and swamps further down to the rear of the French position. With much difficulty this was achieved and in a few days the guns were planted on the river-bank where a French naval force stood defending it. Rogers' cannon opened up upon these vessels surprising them; the closest sloop cut her cable and a strong west wind then drove her ashore into the hands of the British. The other vessels and gunboats made all sail downstream but stranded in a bend of the river, where the rangers, swimming out with their tomahawks, boarded and took one of them, and the rest soon surrendered. With their communications cut the French evacuated the island which then fell to the British. Soon after the Forts of Saint Jean and Chambly were burned by the French; the Rangers then led the final advance on Montreal which surrendered without a fight the following month.

== Pontiac's War ==
At the end of the war, the Rangers were given the task of taking command of Fort Detroit from the French forces. After the war, most of the Rangers returned to civilian life. In 1763, Rogers recruited several volunteers for the reinforcement of Detroit commanded by James Dalyell of the 1st Royal Regiment and formerly of the 80th Regiment of Light Armed Foot (Gage's Light Infantry). Upon arrival at Detroit, Dalyell talked post Commandant Henry Gladwin into allowing Dalyell to take his reinforcements to attack an Indian village near Parent's Creek. The force of 250–300 soldiers of the 55th and 60th regiments, Rogers' volunteers, and the Queen's Royal American Rangers under the command of Captain Joseph Hopkins was ambushed, as the advanced guard made up of men from the 55th regiment crossed the bridge at Parent's Creek. Rogers' men were responsible for effectively covering the retreat of the force back to Fort Detroit.

== American War of Independence ==
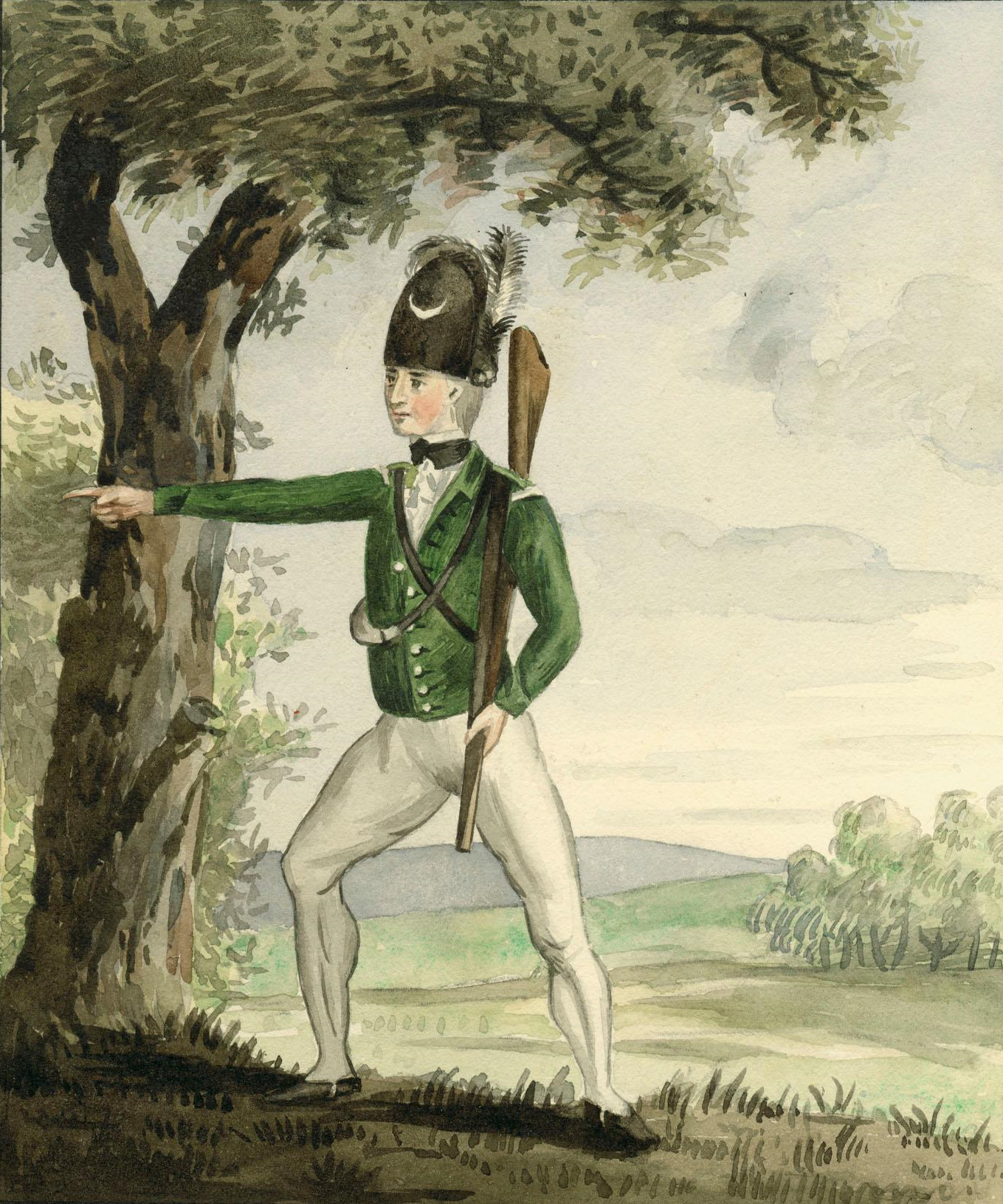
Roger's Rangers successor unit, the Queen's Rangers, c. 1780

The American Revolutionary War began with the Battles of Lexington and Concord in April 1775, and Robert Rogers offered his services to General George Washington soon after. However, Washington turned him down, fearing that he might be a spy, since Rogers had just returned from a long stay in England. Rogers was infuriated by the rejection, so he offered his services to the British. He formed the Queen's Rangers (1776) and later the King's Rangers. Rogers was instrumental in the capture of Nathan Hale in September 1776. On October 22, 1776, Rogers' Rangers were involved in the fierce Battle of Mamaroneck, also known as Skirmish of Heathcote Hill, where they suffered substantial casualties.

Several of Rogers' former rangers served under General Benedict Arnold in the revolutionary forces around Lake Champlain.

== Legacy ==
After the conclusion of the American War of Independence, Rogers Rangers were granted tracts of land for farming in Pownal, Prince Edward Island, Canada, The success of units like Rogers' Rangers prompted the British to integrate similar tactics into their regular army structure, creating light infantry units like Gage's Light Infantry (80th Regiment of Light-Armed Foot) formed in 1758 and a further evolution in the Rifle Brigade (Experimental Corps of Riflemen) formed in 1800, The British light infantry can be seen as the British Army's attempt to formalize and integrate the proven tactics of units like Rogers' Rangers into the structure of a regular army, the adoption of Ranger and light infantry tactics by the British Army predates the formal adoption of these tactics by the Continental Army during the Revolutionary War.

The Rangers were reactivated as part of the U.S. Regular Army during the War of 1812. The Queen's York Rangers (1st American Regiment) of the Canadian Army claim to be descended from Rogers' Rangers. Also claiming descent from Rogers' Rangers are the U.S. Army Rangers and the British Army's Ranger Regiment.

Rogers' Rangers are featured on a New Hampshire historical marker (number 56) along New Hampshire Route 10 in Haverhill, New Hampshire.

== In popular culture ==
- Kenneth Roberts' historical novel Northwest Passage (1937) portrays the events of Rogers' Rangers' raid on the Abenaki town of St. Francis. The first half of the novel was adapted as the film Northwest Passage (1940) starring Spencer Tracy as Rogers.
- The film Fort Ti (1953) stars George Montgomery and Irving Bacon as Rangers rescuing hostages held in Fort Ticonderoga during the French and Indian War.
- The film Mission of Danger portrays a Rogers' Rangers operation with actor Keith Larsen portraying Robert Rogers.
- The Methuen High School in Massachusetts uses the nickname "Rangers". The town was the birthplace of Robert Rogers.
- AMC's 2014 TV series Turn: Washington's Spies portrays Rogers' Rangers as a Loyalist militia that uses intelligence gathered from an unidentified spy inside the Continental Army to ambush its patrols. Robert Rogers remarks early in the first episode that he offered his services first to George Washington, but Washington was unwilling to pay what Rogers demanded.
- Rogers' Rangers appears in Empire: Total War as part of the Special Forces Units & Bonus Content that was released March 2009.

== Notable rangers ==
- Major Robert Rogers
- Captain James Rogers
- Captain John Stark
- Joseph Cilley
- Moses Hazen
- Jonathan Moulton
- Israel Putnam
- William Stark
- Simeon Thayer
- James Hackett
- Captain Nathaniel Hutchins

== See also ==
- Robert Rogers' 28 "Rules of Ranging"
- New Hampshire Provincial Regiment
- Sir William Johnson, 1st Baronet
- Francis Marion
