= Fort Wentworth =

Coordinates: 44°35.1′N 71°32′W

Fort Wentworth was built by order of Benning Wentworth in 1755. The fort was built at the junction of the Upper Ammonoosuc River and Connecticut River, in Northumberland, New Hampshire, by soldiers of Colonel Joseph Blanchard's New Hampshire Provincial Regiment including Robert Rogers. In 1759, Rogers' Rangers returned here hoping for resupply after their raid on St. Francis, Quebec, but the fort had no garrison and no supplies. Rogers had to travel down the Connecticut River to Fort at Number 4 for reinforcements and supplies for his hungry men.

During the American Revolutionary War, Jeremiah Eames' Company of rangers garrisoned and repaired the unused fort from 1776 to 1778 in order to protect northern New Hampshire from attack from the British nearby in Canada. Other units of New Hampshire Militia also formed part of the garrison until the end of the war in 1783.

A stone monument stands near the village of Groveton on U.S. Route 3 near the site of the fort.
