= Battle on Snowshoes (1757) =

1757 skirmish of the French and Indian War

- Part of the French and Indian War
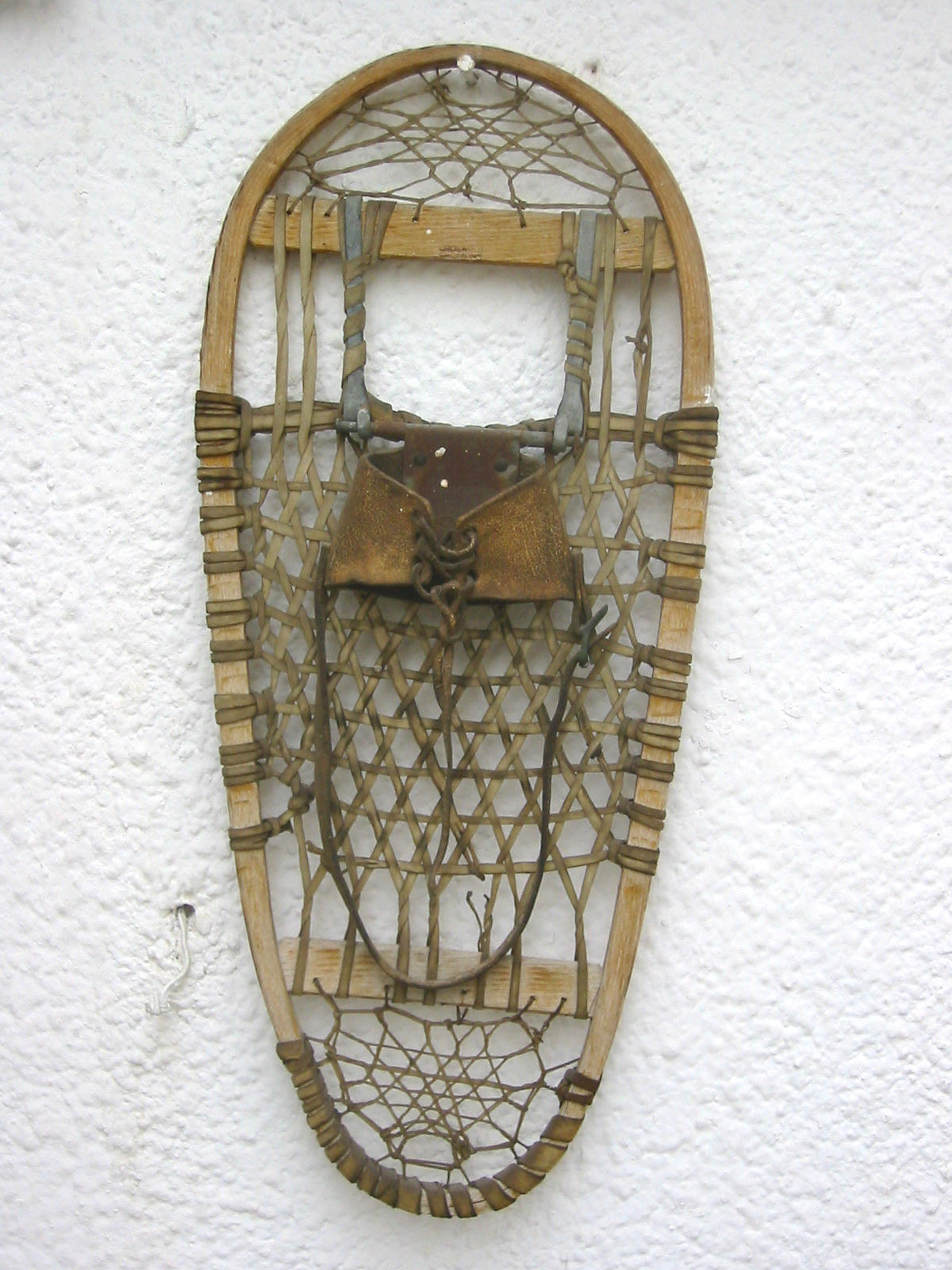
- A traditional snowshoe
Date	January 21, 1757
Location	near Fort Carillon (now Ticonderoga) 43°50′29″N 73°23′15″W
Result	Inconclusive

Belligerents
France: (New France) Colony of Canada	Great Britain: British America

Commanders and leaders
(Kingdom of France) Capitaine de Basserode; Charles Michel de Langlade	Robert Rogers

Strength
179 regulars, Canadiens and Indians	74

Casualties and losses
11 killed 27 wounded	14 killed 9 wounded 6 missing or captured

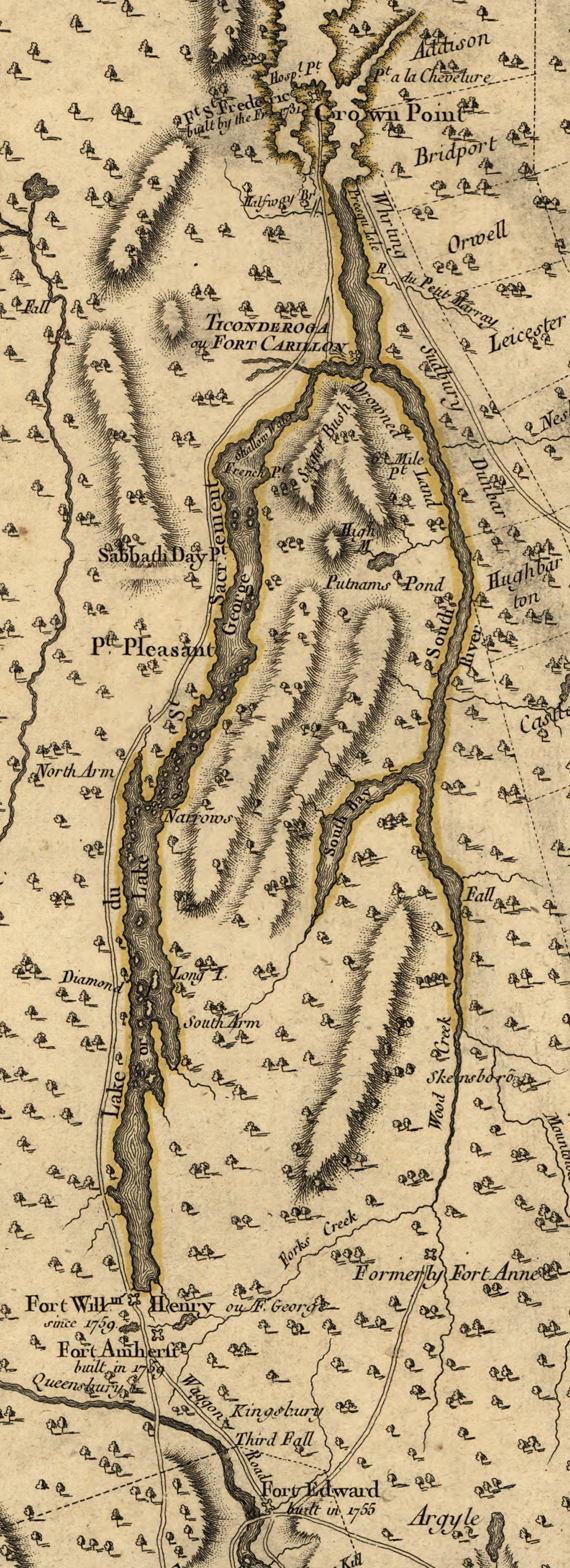
Detail from a 1777 map by John Montresor. In 1757, the road along the left side of Lake George did not exist. Forts Edward and William Henry are near the bottom of this map. This battle took place somewhere between Ticonderoga and Crown Point.

The Battle on Snowshoes (French: Bataille en raquettes) was a skirmish fought between Rogers' Rangers and Canadien and Indian troops during the French and Indian War on January 21, 1757. The battle was given this name because the British combatants wore snowshoes. On January 21, 1757, Captain Robert Rogers and a band of his rangers were on a scouting expedition near Fort Carillon on Lake Champlain when they were ambushed by a mixed troop of French regulars, Canadien militiamen, and Indians. The fighting ended when darkness set in, with significant casualties on both sides. The French in their reports claimed the British had a distinct advantage due to their snowshoes.

== Background ==
The French and Indian War broke out in 1754 between British and French colonists over territorial disputes along their colonial frontiers, and escalated the following year to include regular troops. By 1756, the French had enjoyed successes in most of their frontier battles against the British. Their only notable failure occurred when the British stopped their southward advance from Lake Champlain in the 1755 Battle of Lake George. From bases at Fort St. Frédéric (located at what is now Crown Point, New York) and Fort Carillon (known to the British as Fort Ticonderoga), the French and their Indian allies continued to scout and probe the British defenses on Lake George and the upper Hudson River. The British, who had fewer Indian allies, resorted to companies of rangers for their scouting and reconnaissance activities. The ranger companies were organized and directed by Robert Rogers, and eventually became known as Rogers' Rangers.

== Prelude ==
In the winter of 1757, Rogers and several companies of his rangers were stationed at Fort William Henry at the southern end of Lake George and at Fort Edward on the upper Hudson. These forts were principally garrisoned by elements of the 44th and 48th Regiments, and formed the frontier between the British province of New York and the French province of Canada.

Captain Rogers led a scouting expedition from Fort Edward on January 15, stopping at Fort William Henry to acquire provisions, snowshoes, and additional soldiers. The company left Fort William Henry on January 17 with 86 men, heading down the frozen Lake George. The next day twelve men turned back because of injuries. The remaining men continued north, reaching Lake Champlain at a point between Fort Carillon and Fort St. Frédéric on January 21. They spotted a sled moving on the lake toward Fort St. Frédéric, so Rogers sent Lieutenant John Stark and some men to intercept it. However, more sleds were spotted, and Stark's men were seen before they could retreat back into the woods. The sleds turned back toward Carillon. The British gave chase, but most of the French escaped. Rogers succeeded in taking seven prisoners.

Rogers learned from questioning the prisoners that a French and Indian war party had just arrived at Carillon, and that the two forts were garrisoned by a thousand regulars. Concerned that the escaped sleds would raise the alarm, Rogers immediately ordered a return to their last camp. His council disapproved of the return by the same route (a violation of Rogers' own ranging guidelines), but he overruled them, citing the need for speed and the deep snow. By early afternoon they had returned to their camp, rested, and were on their way south.

M. de Rouilly, the leader of the supply convoy Rogers had intercepted, returned to Carillon and alerted Paul-Louis de Lusignan, the fort's commander. According to Lusignan's report, he immediately sent out a party of about 90 regulars from the Languedoc regiment under the command of Capitaine de Basserode, accompanied by about 90 Canadian militia and Indians. The Indians were primarily Ottawa under the command of Charles Michel de Langlade, one of the French-Indian leaders at Braddock's defeat in 1755.

== Battle ==
Rogers' men then walked into an ambush, according to his estimate, by "250 French and Indians." The British were fortunate that many of the French muskets misfired due to wet gunpowder, as the surprise was nearly complete. Lieutenant Stark, who was bringing up the rear of the ranger column, established a defensive line on a rise with some of his men, from which they gave covering fire as those in the front retreated to that position. As they retreated Rogers ordered his captives slain so that his men might move more freely.

The fight lasted several hours and ended only after sunset, when neither side could see the other. Rogers was injured twice during the battle, once to the head and once to the hand. The French reported that they were at a disadvantage, since they were without snowshoes and "floundering in snow up to their knees". Once darkness set in, Rogers and his survivors retreated 6 miles (9.7 km) to Lake George, where he sent Stark with two men to Fort William Henry for assistance. On January 23, Rogers returned to Fort William Henry with 48 able-bodied and six wounded soldiers.

== Aftermath ==
Bougainville questioned some of the men captured during the battle. He learned from them the disposition of men and materials all the way from Albany to Fort William Henry. Other captured British ended up as slaves to the Indians. Thomas Brown, who published a pamphlet that vividly described his captivity, spent almost two years in slavery, traveling as far as the Mississippi River before reaching Albany in November 1758.

A similar battle was fought the following year, in which Rogers was very nearly killed and his company was decimated.

== Bibliography ==
- Bougainville, Louis Antoine de (1964). Hamilton, Edward P. (ed.). Adventures in the Wilderness. Norman, OK: University of Oklahoma Press. OCLC 506918.
- Brumwell, Stephen (2004). White Devil. Cambridge, MA: Da Capo. ISBN 0-306-81389-0. OCLC 57655778.
- Rogers, Robert; Hough, Franklin Benjamin (1883). Journals of Major Robert Rogers. Albany, NY: Joel Munsell's Sons. OCLC 1999679.
- Steele, Ian Kenneth (1990). Betrayals: Fort William Henry and the massacre. Oxford University Press US. ISBN 978-0-19-505893-2. OCLC 20098712.

== See also ==
- Battle of Fort William Henry
- Battle of Carillon
