= Robert Rogers (British Army officer) =

British Army officer and frontiersman (1731–1795)

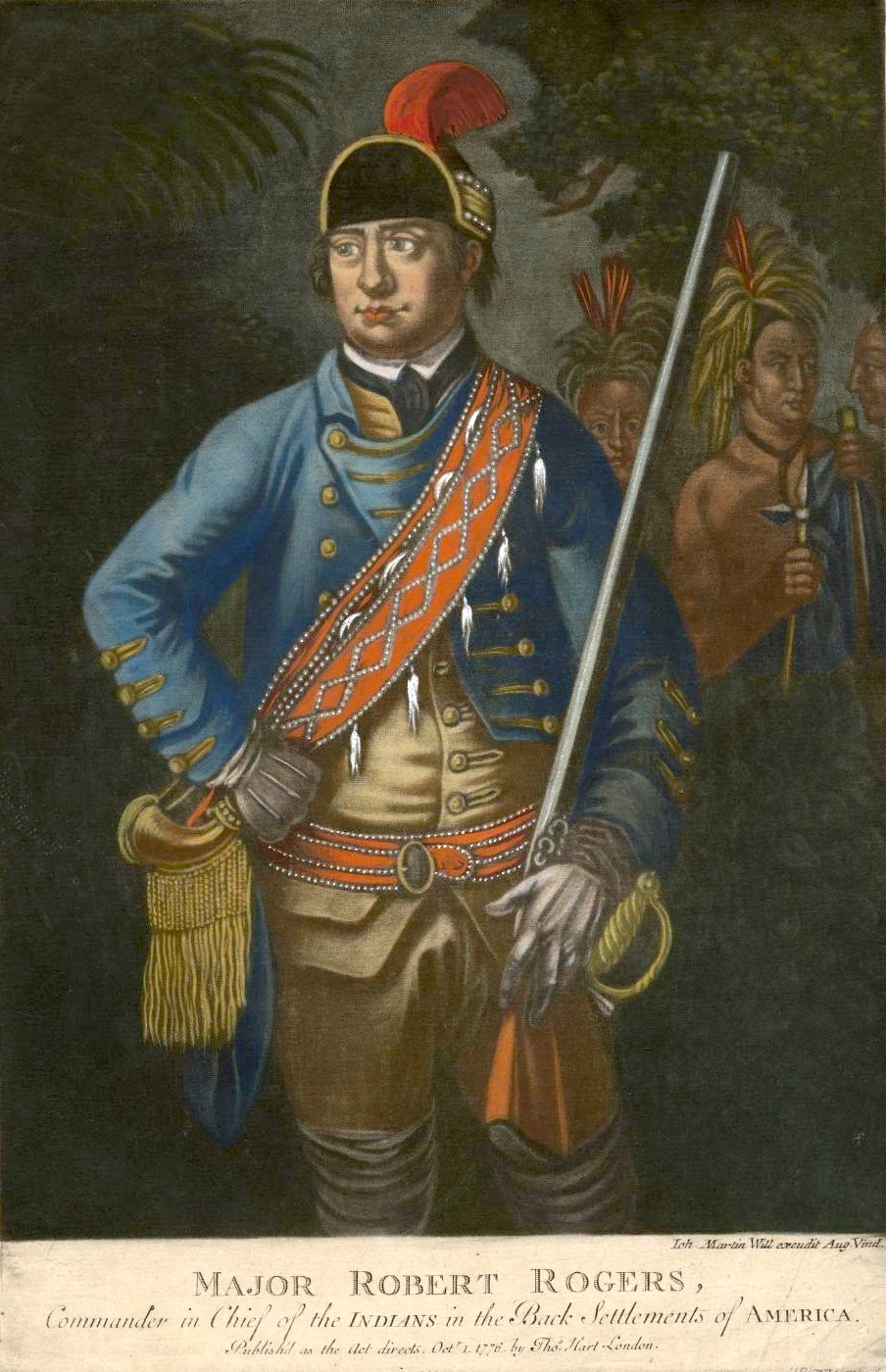
- 1776 portrait
- Born: 7 November 1731; Methuen, Massachusetts Bay
- Died: 18 May 1795 (aged 63); London, England
- Military career
- Allegiance: New Hampshire; Great Britain
- Branch: New Hampshire Militia (1746–1748); British Army (1755–1777)
- Rank: Lieutenant colonel
- Nicknames: Wobomagonda ("White Devil")
- Units: Rogers' Rangers; Queen's Rangers; King's Rangers
- Conflicts: King George's War; French and Indian War; Battle on Snowshoes (1757); Battle of Fort William Henry; Battle on Snowshoes; Battle of Carillon; St. Francis Raid; Sainte-Thérèse Raid; Montreal Campaign; Pontiac's War; Battle of Bloody Run; American Revolutionary War; Battle of Mamaroneck

Lieutenant-Colonel Robert Rogers (7 November 1731 – 18 May 1795) was a British Army officer and frontiersman. Born in Methuen, Massachusetts, he fought in King George's War, the French and Indian War and the American Revolutionary War. During the French and Indian War, Rogers raised and commanded Rogers' Rangers, a light infantry unit trained for carrying out asymmetric warfare.

== Early life ==
Robert Rogers was born to Ulster-Scots settlers, James and Mary McFatridge Rogers on 7 November 1731 in Methuen, a small town in northeastern Massachusetts. At that time, the town was a staging point for Scots-Irish settlers bound for the wilderness of New Hampshire.

In 1739 when Rogers was eight years old, his family relocated to the Great Meadow district of New Hampshire near present-day Concord, where James founded a settlement on 2,190 acres (8.9 km^{2}) of land which he called Munterloney, after a hilly place in County Londonderry, Ireland. Rogers referred to this childhood residence as "Mountalona". It was later renamed Dunbarton, New Hampshire.

In 1740, the War of the Austrian Succession (1740–1748) broke out in Europe and, in 1744, the war spread to North America, where it was known as King George's War (1744–1748). During Rogers's youth (1746), he saw service in the New Hampshire militia as a private in Captain Daniel Ladd's Scouting Company and, in 1747, also as a private in Ebenezer Eastman's Scouting Company, both times guarding the New Hampshire frontier.

In 1754, Rogers became involved with a gang of counterfeiters. He was indicted but the case was never brought to trial.

== French and Indian War ==
In 1755, war engulfed the colonies, spreading also to Europe. Britain and France declared war on each other. The British in America suffered a string of defeats including Braddock's at the Battle of the Monongahela trying to capture Fort Duquesne. Encouraged by the French victories, American Indians launched a series of attacks along the colonial frontier. During the French and Indian War, Israel Putnam (who would go on to later fame in the Revolutionary War) fought as a Connecticut militia captain in conjunction with Rogers, and at one point saved his life.

=== Ranger recruiter ===
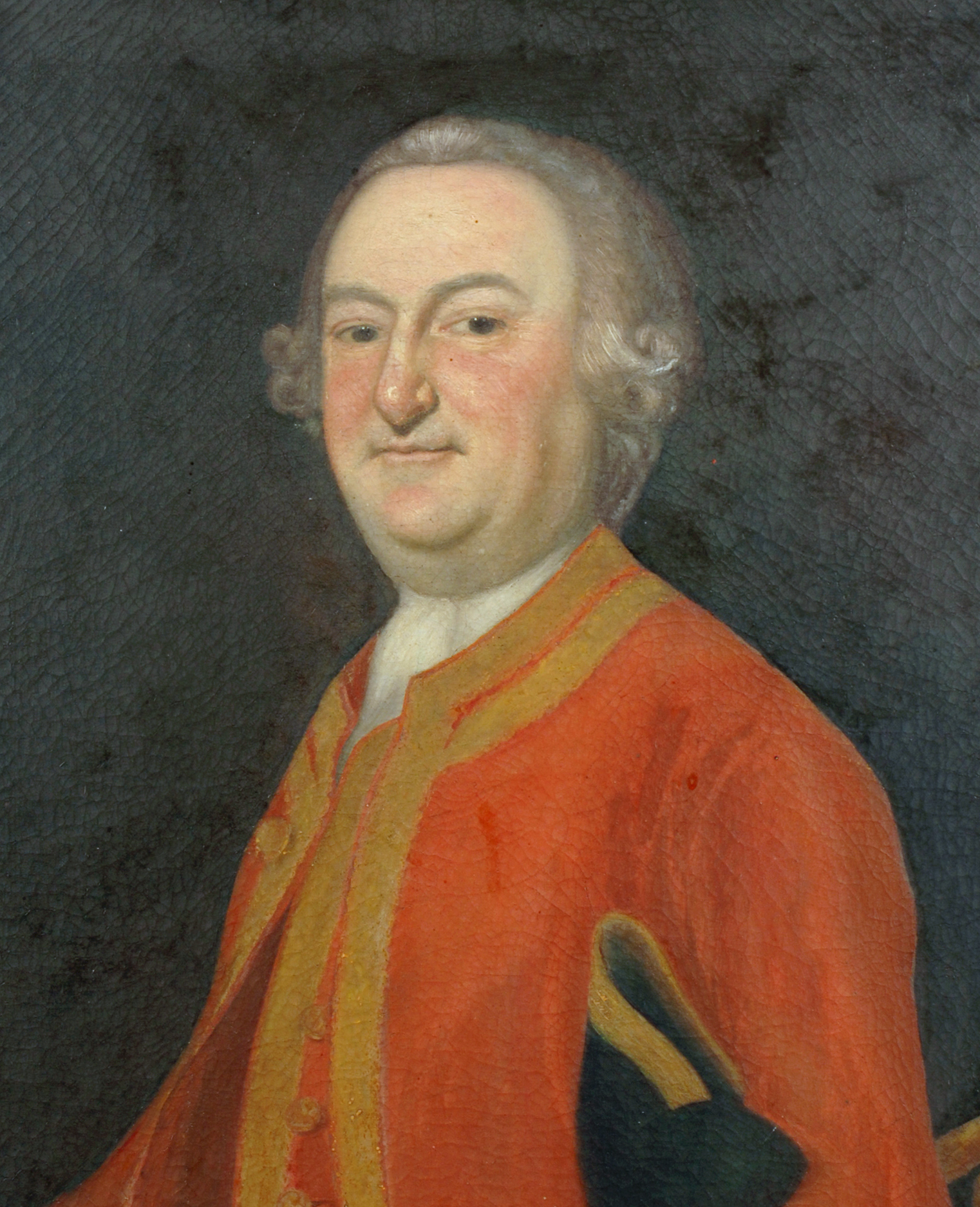
John Winslow, for whom Rogers recruited his Rangers

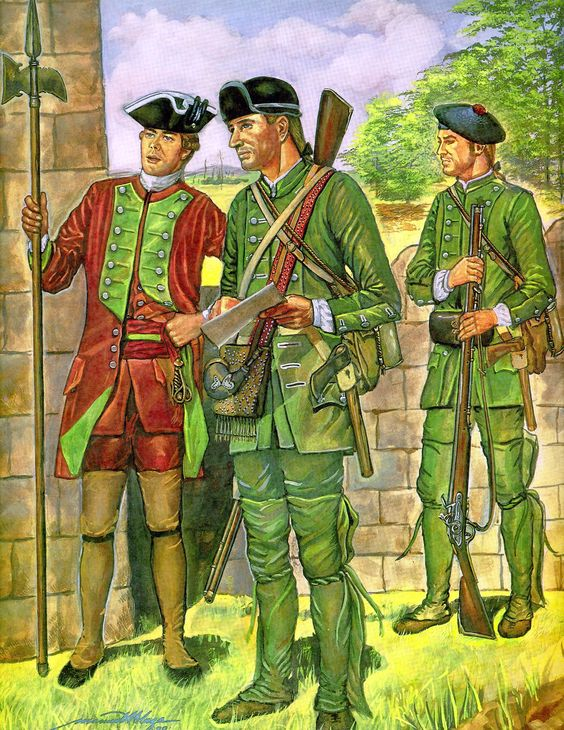
Two soldiers of Roger's Rangers with a British Army sergeant

In 1756, Rogers arrived in Portsmouth, New Hampshire, and began to muster soldiers for the British Crown, using the authority vested in him by Colonel Winslow. Rogers's recruitment drive was well supported by the frightened and angry provincials due to attacks by American Indians along the frontier. In Portsmouth, he also met his future wife Elizabeth Browne, the youngest daughter of Anglican Reverend Arthur Browne.

Robert's brothers James, Richard, and possibly John all served in Rogers' Rangers. Richard died of smallpox in 1757 at Fort William Henry. His corpse was later disinterred and mutilated by hostile Indians.

=== Rogers and the Rangers ===
Rogers raised and commanded the famous Rogers' Rangers that fought for the British during the French and Indian War. This militia unit operated primarily in the Lake George and Lake Champlain regions of New York. They frequently undertook winter raids against French towns and military emplacements, traveling on sleds, crude snowshoes, and even ice skates across frozen rivers. Rogers' Rangers were never fully respected by the British regulars, yet they were one of the few non-Indian forces able to operate in the inhospitable region despite harsh winter conditions and mountainous terrain.

Rogers showed an unusual talent for commanding his unit in conditions to which the regular armies of the day were unaccustomed. He took the initiative in mustering, equipping, and commanding ranger units. He wrote an early guide for commanding such units as Robert Rogers' 28 "Rules of Ranging". The Queen's York Rangers of the Canadian Army and the U.S. Army Rangers both claim Rogers as their founder, and "Rogers' Standing Orders" are still quoted on the first page of the U.S. Army's Ranger handbook.

Rogers was personally responsible for paying his soldiers, and he went deeply into debt and took loans to ensure that they were paid properly after their regular pay was raided during transport. He was never compensated by the British Army or government, though he had reason to believe that he should have his expenses reimbursed.

=== Northern campaign ===
From 1755 to 1758, Rogers and his rangers served under a series of unsuccessful British commanders operating over the northern accesses to the British colonies: Major General William Johnson, Major General William Shirley, Colonel William Haviland, and Major General James Abercromby. At the time, the British could do little more than fight defensive campaigns around Lake Champlain, Crown Point, Ticonderoga, and the upper Hudson.

During this time, the rangers proved indispensable; they grew gradually to twelve companies, as well as several additional contingents of Indians who had pledged their allegiance to the British cause. The rangers were kept organizationally distinct from British regulars. Rogers was their acting commandant, as well as the direct commander of his own company.

On 21 January 1757 at the First Battle of the Snowshoes, Rogers' Rangers ambushed and captured seven Canadians near Fort Carillon but then encountered a hundred French and Canadian militia and Ottawa Indians from the Ohio Country. Roger's forces retreated after taking casualties of 14 killed, nine wounded, and six missing or captured; the French-Indian forces were 11 killed, 27 wounded.

British forces surrendered Fort William Henry in August 1757, after which the Rangers were stationed on Rogers Island near Fort Edward. This allowed them to train and operate with more freedom than the regular British forces.

On 13 March 1758 at the Second Battle of the Snowshoes, Rogers' Rangers ambushed a French and Indian column and, in turn, were ambushed by enemy forces. The Rangers lost 125 men in this encounter, as well as eight men wounded, with 52 surviving. Rogers estimated 100 killed and nearly 100 wounded of the French-Indian forces; however, the French listed casualties as a total of ten Indians killed and seventeen wounded.

On 7 July 1758, Rogers' Rangers took part in the Battle of Carillon.

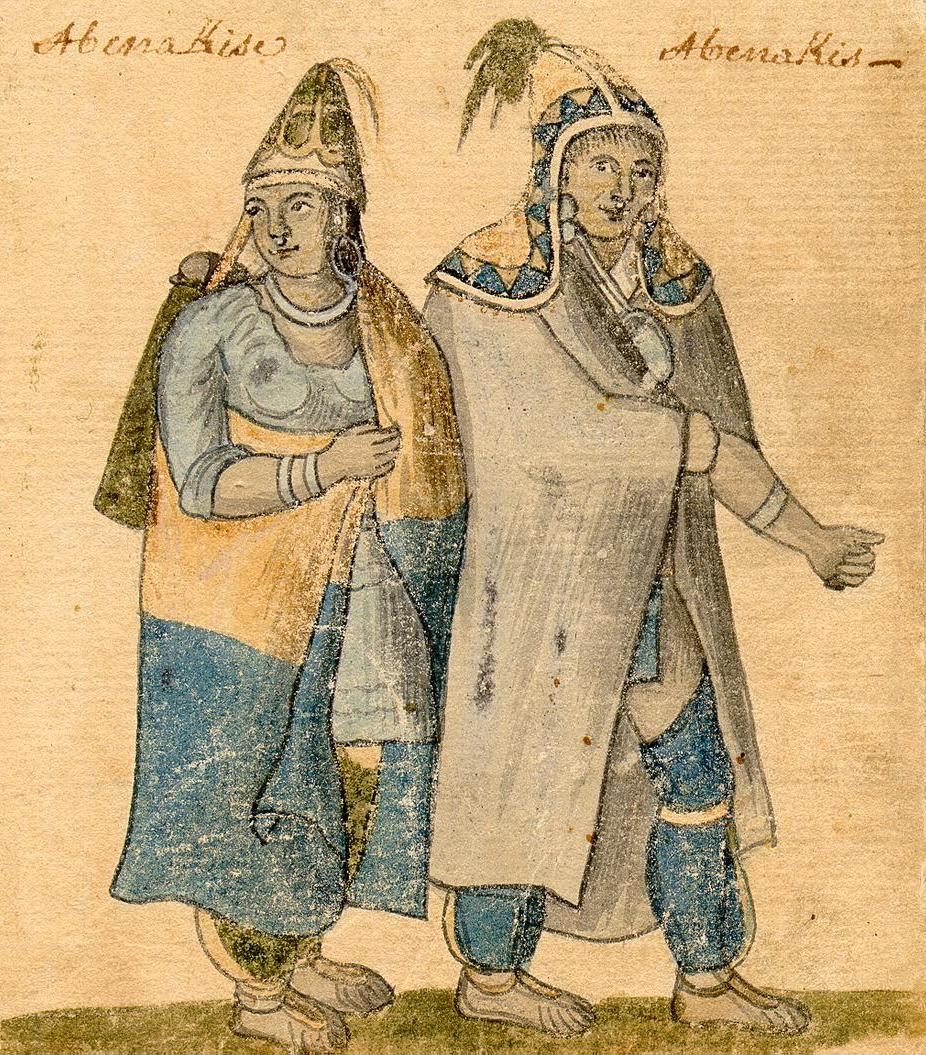
Abenakis (18th-century)

In 1758, Abercromby recognized Rogers's accomplishments by promoting him to Major, with the equally famous John Stark as his second in command. Rogers now held two ranks appropriate to his double role: Captain and Major.

In 1759, the tide of the war turned and the British advanced on the city of Quebec. Major General Jeffrey Amherst, the newly appointed Commander-in-Chief of British forces in North America, had a brilliant and definitive idea. He dispatched Rogers and his rangers on an expedition far behind enemy lines to the west against the Abenakis at Saint-Francis in Quebec, a staging base for Indian raids into New England. Rogers led a force of two hundred rangers from Crown Point, New York, deep into French territory to Saint-Francis.

At this time, the Indians near Saint-Francis had given up their aboriginal way of life and were living in a town next to a French mission. Rogers losses were 41 killed; 7 wounded 10 captured. Following the 3 October 1759 attack and successful destruction of Saint-Francis, Rogers's force ran out of food during their retreat back through the rugged wilderness of northern Vermont. The Rangers reached a safe location along the Connecticut River at the abandoned Fort Wentworth. Rogers left them encamped, and returned a few days later with food and relief forces from Fort at Number 4, now Charlestown, New Hampshire, the nearest British town.

The destruction of Saint-Francis by Rogers was a major psychological victory, as the colonists no longer felt that they were helpless. The residents of Saint-Francis, a combined group of Abenakis and others, understood that they were no longer beyond reach. Abenaki raids along the frontier did not cease, but significantly diminished.

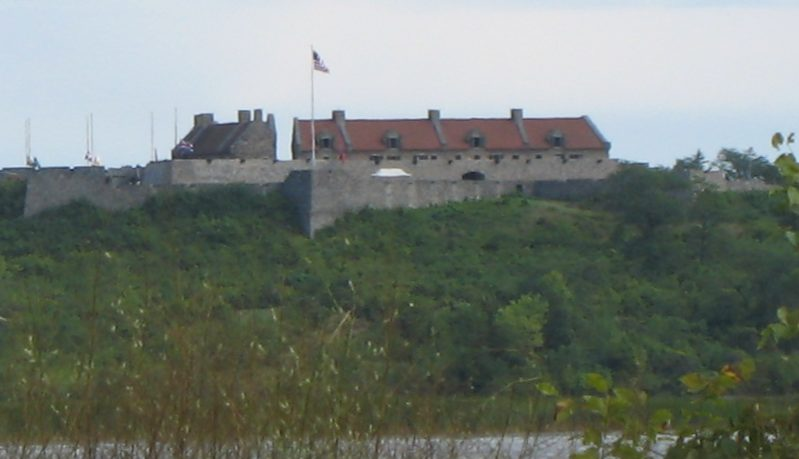
Fort Ticonderoga
(Fort Carillon)

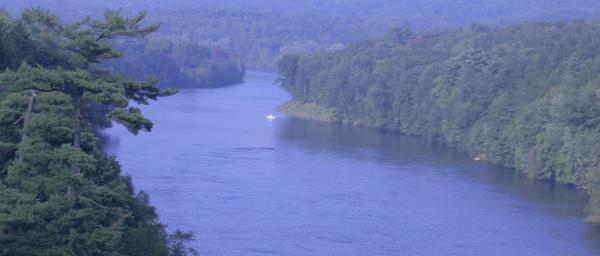
Connecticut River in Massachusetts

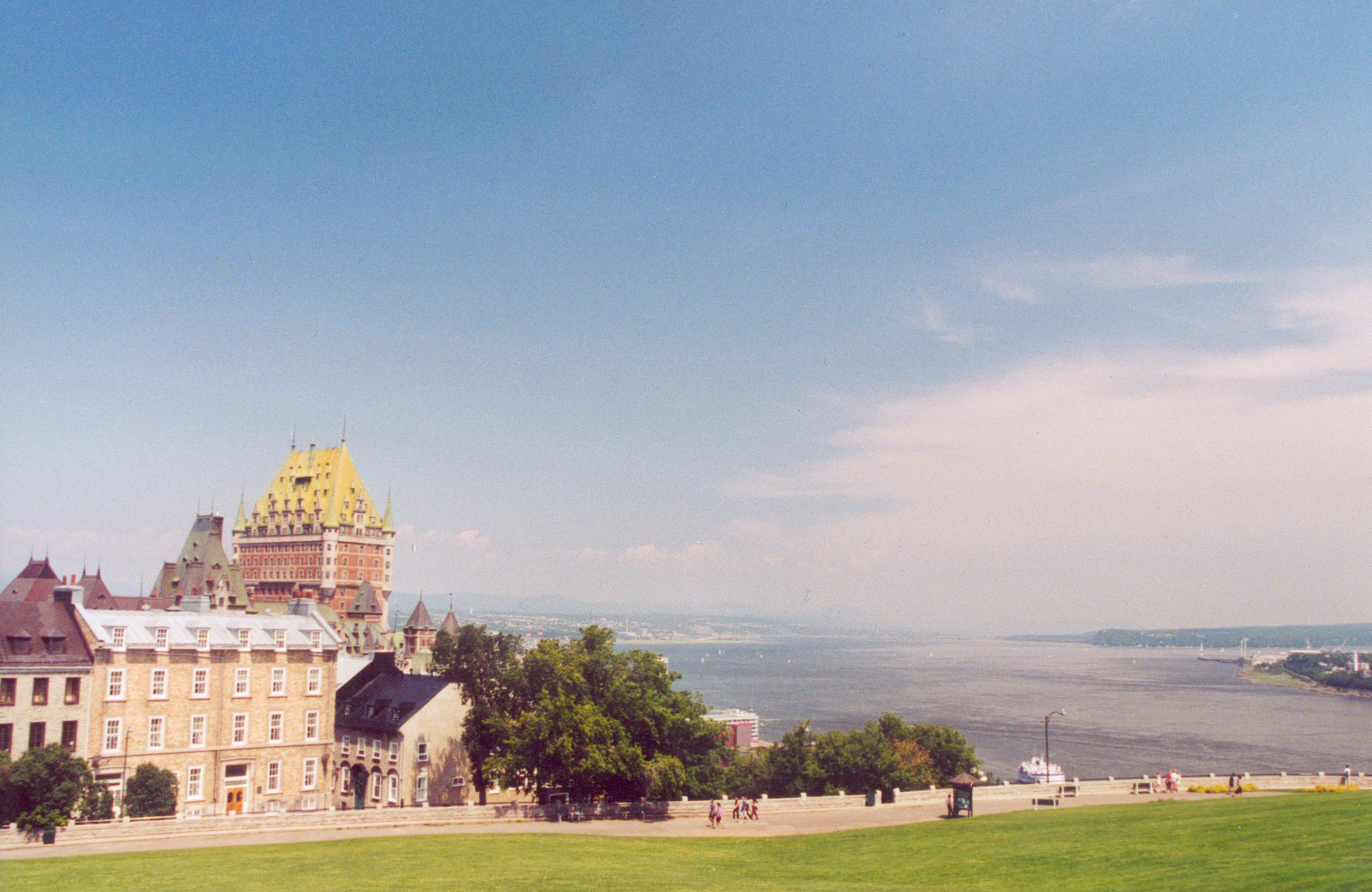
Plains of Abraham in Quebec

=== Montreal Campaign ===
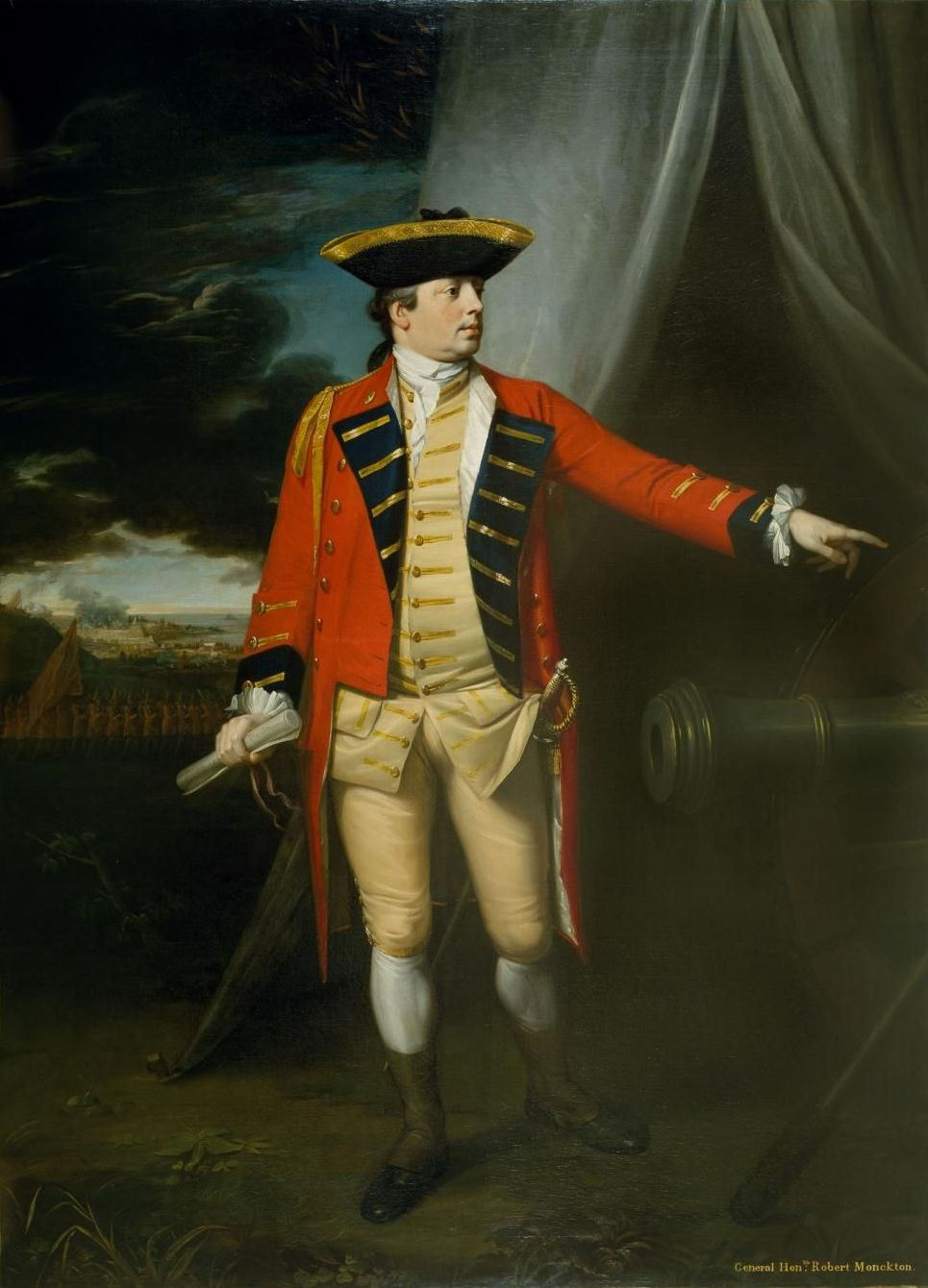
Robert Monckton was Rogers's superior officer during the western campaign

Quebec fell in 1759, and in spring 1760 Rogers joined in Amherst's campaign on Montreal. Before doing so however, in June Rogers conducted a successful pre-emptive raid on Fort Sainte Thérèse, a supply base for the French army as well as a vital link in the communication and supply line between Fort Saint-Jean and the French forces at Île aux Noix.

Roger's was then part of William Haviland's thrust (one of three all led by Amherst) on Montreal in August where it marched from Lake Ontario in the west along the Saint Lawrence River and from upper New York via the Richelieu River. Along the way Rogers fought to reduce Île aux Noix which succeeded in a ruse attack. Soon after Fort Saint-Jean was burned by the French, and Chambly was seized. The Rangers then led the final advance on Montreal, which surrendered without a fight the following month.

=== Western campaign ===
Rogers then advanced when Indian activity ceased against colonials in the east, and Rogers's service there was over. General Amherst transferred him to Brigadier General Robert Monckton, commanding at Fort Pitt (formerly Fort Duquesne). Following Amherst's advice, Monckton sent the rangers to capture Detroit, far to the north, which they did.

On 29 November 1760 in Detroit, Rogers received the submission of the French posts on the Great Lakes; during the spring 1761, Rogers and his Rangers occupied Fort Michilimackinac and Fort St. Joseph. It was the final act of his command. Shortly thereafter, his rangers were disbanded. Monckton offered Rogers command of a company of regulars in South Carolina but, after visiting the place, Rogers chose instead to command another company in New York. That unit was soon disbanded, however, and Rogers was forced into retirement at half-pay.

No longer preoccupied with military affairs, Rogers returned to New England to marry Elizabeth Browne in June, 1761, and set up housekeeping with her in Concord, New Hampshire. Like many New Englanders, they had indentured servants and slaves, including an Indian boy captured at Saint-Francis.

Rogers received large grants of land in southern New Hampshire in compensation for his services. He sold much of it at a profit and was able to purchase and maintain slaves. He deeded much of his land to his wife's family, which served to support her later.

In 1761, Rogers purchased a commission commanding a British Independent Company serving in South Carolina during the Anglo-Cherokee War. While Rogers never commanded his men in the field, his company participated in the 1761 Grant Campaign which destroyed the homes and food of more than 5000 Cherokee men, women, and children.

On 10 February 1763, the French and Indian War came to an end with the Treaty of Paris (also known as the Treaty of 1763). Rogers found himself once more a soldier of fortune, still on half-pay. Later, General Thomas Gage remarked that, if the army had put him on whole pay, they could have prevented his later unfit employment (Gage's terms).

== Pontiac's War ==
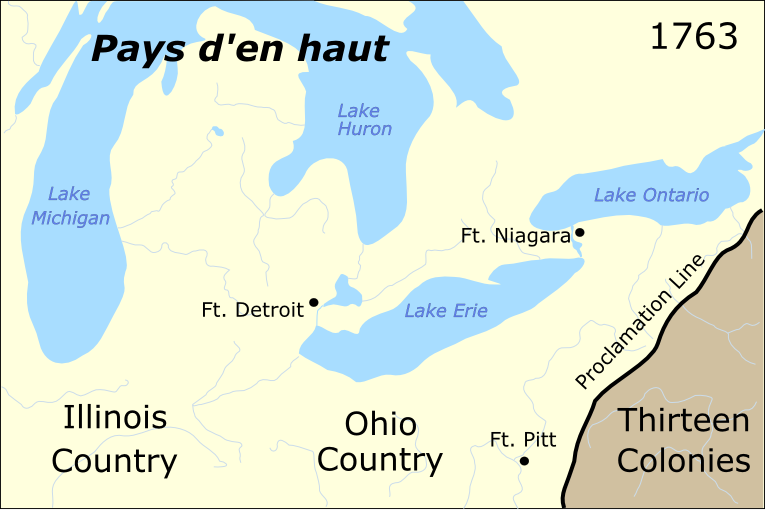
The main theater of operations during Pontiac's War

On 7 May 1763, Pontiac's War broke out in the Ohio Country. Odawa leader Pontiac attempted to capture Fort Detroit by surprise with a force of 300 warriors. However, the British commander was aware of Pontiac's plan, and his garrison was armed and ready. Undaunted, Pontiac withdrew and laid siege to the fort. Eventually, more than 900 Indian warriors from a half-dozen tribes joined the siege of Fort Detroit.

Upon hearing this news, Rogers offered his services to General Jeffrey Amherst. Rogers then accompanied Captain James Dalyell with a relief force to Fort Detroit. Their ill-fated mission was terminated at the Battle of Bloody Run on 31 July 1763.

In an attempt to break Pontiac's siege, about 250 British troops led by Dalyell and Rogers attempted a surprise attack on his encampment. However, Pontiac was ready, supposedly alerted by French settlers, and he defeated the British at Parent's Creek two miles north of the fort. The creek or run was said to have run red with the blood of the 20 dead and 34 wounded British soldiers and was henceforth known as Bloody Run. Captain James Dalyell was one of those killed.

Soon after these events, Pontiac's war effort collapsed and Pontiac himself faded away into obscurity and death. Surprisingly, Rogers later memorialized Pontiac and his conflict in a stage play during his sojourn in England.

== Post-war success and failure ==
Rogers had brought total dedication to his position as commander of the rangers. As was often the custom in the British and American armies, he had spent his own money to equip the rangers when needed and consequently had gone into debt. In 1764, he was faced with the problem of repaying his creditors.

To recoup his finances, Robert engaged briefly in a business venture with the fur trader John Askin near Detroit. After it failed, he hoped to win the money by gambling, with the result that he was totally ruined. His creditors put him in prison for debt in New York, but he escaped.

=== Author in Britain ===
In 1765, Rogers voyaged to England to obtain pay for his service and capitalize on his fame. His journals and A Concise Account of North America were published. Immediately thereafter, he wrote the stage play Ponteach [Pontiac]: or the Savages of America (1766), significant as an early American drama and for its sympathetic portrayal of American Indians. He enjoyed some moderate success with his publications (though Ponteach was condemned by the critics) and attracted royal attention. He had an audience with King George III, to whom he proposed undertaking an expedition to find the Northwest Passage. The King appointed Rogers governor of Michilimackinac (Mackinaw City, Michigan) with a charter to look for the passage, and he returned to North America.

=== Royal Governor ===
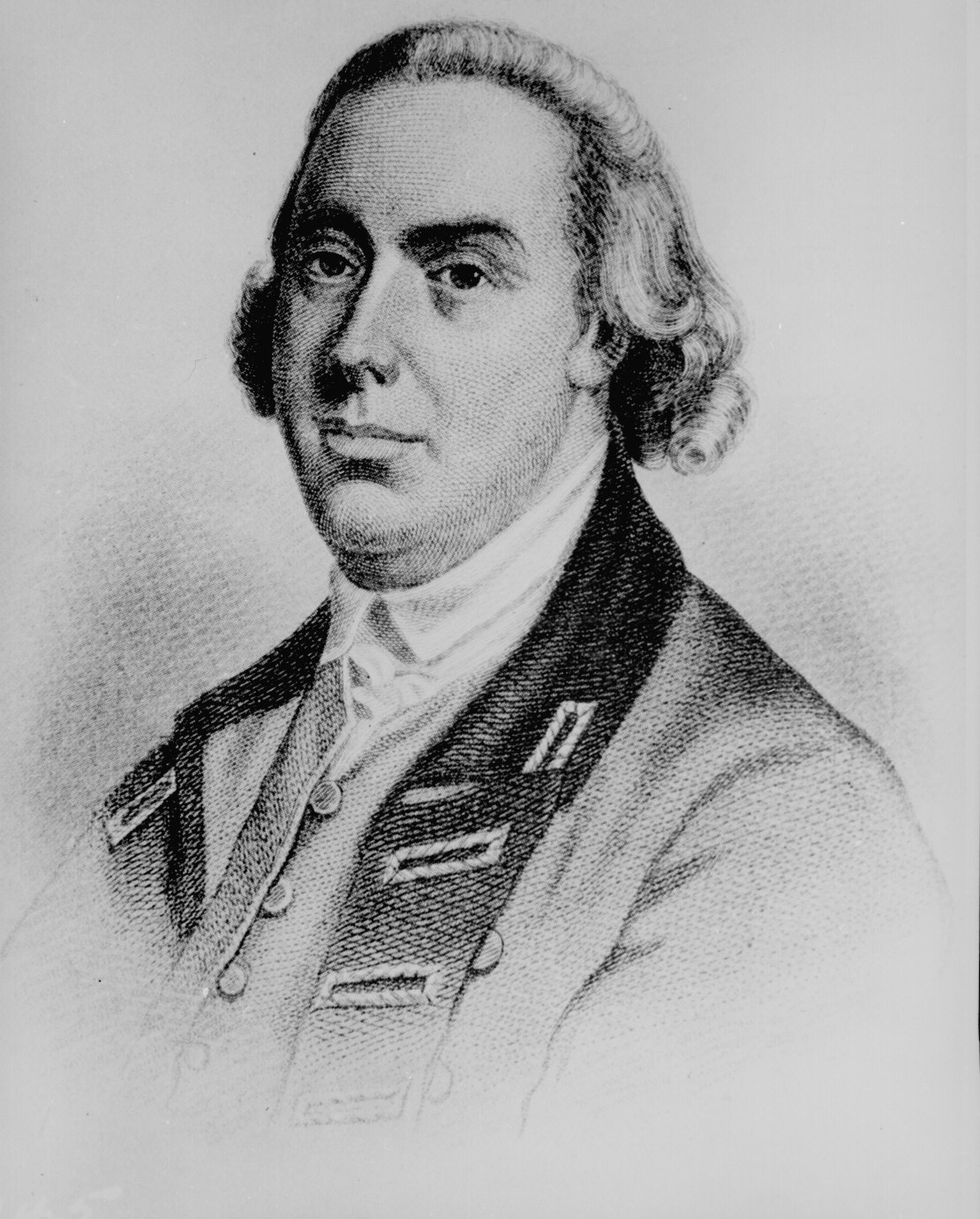
Thomas Gage bitterly disliked Rogers due to his close friendship with Jeffrey Amherst, Gage's rival

Upon his return to America, Rogers moved with his wife to the fur-trading outpost of Fort Michilimackinac and began his duties as royal governor. During Rogers's absence, Amherst had been replaced by Thomas Gage as commander of the British forces in America, and Gage was a bitter rival of Amherst. Rogers was a loyal friend of Amherst and was consequently hated by Gage.

As an aristocrat and political intriguer, Gage viewed Rogers as a provincial upstart who posed a threat to his newly acquired power, due to his friendship with Amherst. At the time, Rogers was still a half-pay captain in the British army and, to some degree, under Gage's military jurisdiction. However, Gage could not challenge Rogers, the king's appointee, unless he could find a good reason, as the king would countermand any legal process in order to save his favorites. Knowing this, Gage actively set about finding a solid justification to remove Rogers as royal governor in a way that would forestall royal intervention.

Unaware of Gage's plotting, Rogers continued performing his administrative duties with considerable zest. He dispatched expeditions to search for the fabled Northwest Passage under Jonathan Carver and James Tute, but they were unsuccessful. A path to the Pacific Ocean remained undiscovered until the 1792–93 Peace River expedition led by Alexander MacKenzie, completed overland and via river.

Rogers perceived a need for unity and a stronger government, and he negotiated with the Indians, parlayed with the French, and developed a plan for a province in Michigan to be administered by a governor and Privy Council reporting to the king. This plan was supported by George III, but had little chance of being adopted, since Parliament had no intention of increasing the king's power.

Meanwhile, Gage used every opportunity to defame Rogers, portraying him as an opportunist who had gotten rich on the war only to gamble away his money as a profligate. It is difficult to say how many of these allegations were true and how much Gage believed them to be true. Gage apparently saw Rogers as of questionable loyalty—certainly he was not loyal to Gage—and therefore he needed watching. Rogers's dealings with the American Indians troubled Gage, as he and many other British officers in America had come to regard the Indians with great suspicion.

=== Arrest for treason ===
Gage hired spies to intercept Rogers's mail and suborned his subordinates. Rogers had offended his private secretary, Nathaniel Potter, who subsequently gave Gage the excuse that he needed. Potter swore in an affidavit that Rogers had said that he would offer his province to the French if the British authorities failed to approve his method of governance.

Potter's claims were questionable. The French were not in any position to receive Rogers, particularly with a British governor sitting in Montreal. Nevertheless, on the strength of Potter's affidavit, Rogers was arrested in 1767, charged with treason, and taken to Montreal in chains for trial. However, the trial was postponed until 1768. Elizabeth, carrying their only child, went home to Portsmouth. There she gave birth to a son; he was named Arthur. After reaching adulthood, Arthur decided to become a lawyer based in his home town of Portsmouth. He also chose to start a family, the descendants of whom are still living today.

=== Vindication ===
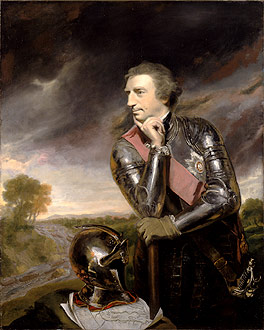
Field Marshal Jeffrey Amherst was a close friend of Rogers and was instrumental in vindicating him of Gage's charges of treason

Gage sent Rogers to Montreal to stand trial but, once there, Rogers was among friends of Amherst. Due to Amherst's influence, Rogers was acquitted of all charges and the verdict was sent to King George III for approval. The king approved, but could not call Gage a liar openly. Instead, he made a note that there was reason to think Rogers might have been treasonous.

Returning to Michigan under the power of Gage was unthinkable; hence, Rogers went to England in 1769 to petition again for debt relief. However, the king had decided that he could do nothing more to help Rogers, and had become preoccupied by the issue of the disaffected colonies. Rogers went again to debtors' prison and tried suing Gage for false imprisonment. Gage settled out of court by offering Rogers the half-pay of a major in return for dropping the suit.

=== American Revolutionary War ===
Because of his legal troubles in England, Robert Rogers missed the major events in the disaffected colonies. He heard that revolution was likely to break out and returned to America in 1775. The Americans were as out of touch with Rogers as he was with them, looking upon him as the noted ranger leader and expecting him to behave as one; they were at a total loss to explain his drunken and licentious behavior. At that time, Rogers was perhaps suffering from the alcoholism that blighted his later life and led to the loss of his family, land, money, and friends.

It is unclear exactly what transpired between the revolutionary leaders and Rogers. Rogers was arrested by the local Committee of Safety as a possible spy and released on parole that he would not serve against the colonies. He was offered a commission in the Revolutionary Army by the Continental Congress, but declined on the grounds that he was a British officer. He later wrote to George Washington asking for a command, but instead Washington had him arrested.

He escaped from Washington's custody only to find revolutionary ranks firm against him, so he offered his services to the British Army. They also were hoping that he would live up to his reputation. In August 1776, he formed another ranger-type unit called the Queen's Rangers as its colonel. In September 1776, Rogers assisted in the capture of Nathan Hale, a spy for the Continental Army. A contemporaneous account of Hale's capture is in the Library of Congress, written by Consider Tiffany, a Connecticut shopkeeper and Loyalist. In Tiffany's account, Rogers did not believe Hale's cover story that he was a teacher, and lured him into his own betrayal by pretending to be a patriot spy himself.

In May 1777, the British Army forcibly retired Rogers on grounds of "poor health". A return home now was impossible; Hale's execution and Rogers raising troops against the colonials seemed to confirm Washington's suspicions. At Washington's prompting, the New Hampshire legislature passed two decrees regarding Rogers: one a proscription, and the other a divorce from his wife on grounds of abandonment and infidelity. She could not afford any friendship or mercy toward Robert now if she expected to remain in New Hampshire. Later, Elizabeth married American naval officer John Roche. She died in 1811.

== Later life and death ==
After a brief sojourn in England, Rogers returned in 1779 to raise the King's Rangers in Nova Scotia for General Sir Henry Clinton. He was unable to keep the position due to his alcoholism, so his place was taken by his brother James. Robert Rogers played no further part in the war.

Rogers was captured by an American privateer and spent some time in a prison in New York, escaping in 1782. In 1783, he was evacuated with other British troops to England. There, he was unable to earn a living, nor was he able to defeat his alcoholism. He died in obscurity and debt in 1795, what little money he had going to pay an arrears in rent. He was buried in London but his gravesite has been lost.

== Legacy ==
Rogers is an inaugural inductee into the United States Army Ranger Hall of Fame in 1992, for tactics and success as a Ranger, setting the standard for today's U.S. Army Rangers.

Camp Rogers, on the eastern edge of Fort Benning, is the location of the Ranger Assessment Phase of U.S. Army Ranger School and the headquarters compound for the United States Army Airborne and Ranger Training Brigade.

On 30 May 2005, (Memorial Day in the U.S.), a statue of Rogers was unveiled during a ceremony on Rogers Island in the Hudson River, 40 miles (64 km) north of Albany, New York. This is near the site where Rogers penned his "Rules of Ranging".

Rogers is mentioned respectfully in "The Ranger Handbook" which is given to every soldier in the U.S. Army's Ranger School, and is referred to in that publication as the originator of ranger tactics in the American military. The Handbook summarizes Rogers's principles of irregular warfare as presented in "Rules of Ranging"."

Methuen High School, in the town in which Rogers was born, uses the "Rangers" as their mascot.

Rogers was portrayed by actor Spencer Tracy in the 1940 film Northwest Passage, based on the first half of Kenneth Roberts' best-selling 1937 novel of the same name, and Keith Larsen in the one year run of the M-G-M/NBC series Northwest Passage, loosely based on the same novel. Later, Angus Macfadyen portrayed Rogers in the Revolutionary War series Turn: Washington's Spies.

== See also ==
- Long-range reconnaissance patrol
- United States Army Rangers
