= Sainte-Thérèse raid =

Military raid in 1760

- Part of the French and Indian War
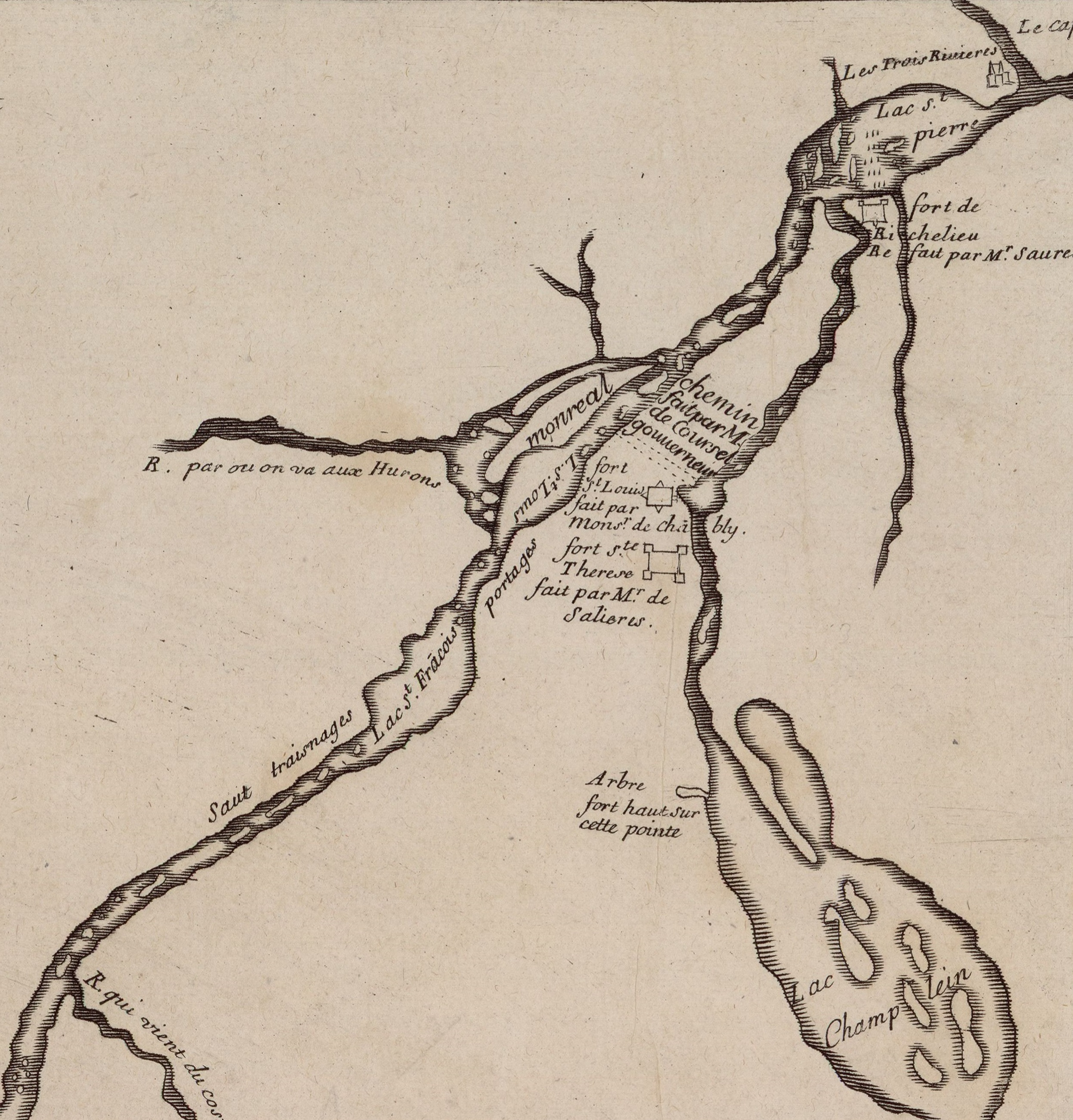
- Map of the Richelieu River with Forts Sainte-Thérèse and Chambly
Date	11 – 21 June 1760
Location	Lake Champlain, Richelieu River, Fort Sainte Thérèse 45.389111°N 73.257515°W
Result	British victory

Belligerents
France: (New France) Colony of Canada	Great Britain: British America

Commanders and leaders
(Kingdom of France) Louis-Antoine de Bougainville	Robert Rogers

Strength
1,875 Regulars, militia and Indians	350 Rangers, regulars and Indians

Casualties and losses
80 casualties 27 captured	30 casualties

The Sainte-Thérèse raid was a military raid on the town of Sainte-Thérèse in French Canada conducted by British elite forces known as Rogers' Rangers that took place during the French and Indian War from 3 to 18 June 1760. Led by Robert Rogers the raid was a pre-emptive strike ordered by Major General Jeffery Amherst as a prelude to his three pronged attack on Montreal the following month.

Setting off from Fort Crown Point they had to fight against a superior force of French and their allied natives along the shores of Lake Champlain. The Rangers then advanced further north to strike at the Forts of Chambly, Saint-Jean and Île aux Noix. Rogers seeing them too well defended, struck at Sainte-Thérèse instead realising it was an important supply hub. Through a clever ruse he destroyed the fort, supplies and settlement capturing prisoners and gaining valuable information before arriving back at Crown Point.

== Background ==
By 1759 in North America forces of Great Britain had succeeded in capturing Fort Ticonderoga, Fort Niagara, and Quebec from the French. The following year the Chevalier De Lévis led a French counterattack to retake Quebec. In April despite winning the Battle of Sainte Foy Lévis failed to take Quebec after a three-week siege and retreated once the British garrison under James Murray had been relieved by the Royal Navy. Lévis retreated to Montreal and helped organise the defense of the region against the inevtiable British attack. The British commander in chief Major General Jeffrey Amherst intended to marshal his numerous forces in a three pronged assault on Montreal from Lake Champlain, Lake Ontario and Quebec to seek a decisive victory that would end the war. From French prisoners captured after the Quebec siege Murray informed Amherst that Lévis had sizeable contingents along the Richelieu River at Forts Chambly, Saint-Jean and Île aux Noix.

Amherst ordered Major Robert Rogers, leader and founder of an elite military group called Roger's Rangers, on a spoiling attack on these French posts, and destroy as many supplies and boats as possible along the Richelieu River. The Rangers in particular Rogers, their reputation at a high from the Saint Francis Raid the year before were well prepared for the task. Rogers was to lead 275 Rangers and 28 Regulars (Light Infantry) in the raid which was hoped to weaken French forces and help divert man power against Amherst's drive on Montreal.

Unknown to Rogers and Amherst - the French under Lévis had ordered Louis Antoine de Bougainville to significantly reinforce the posts along the Richelieu river by June with nearly 1,800 men including militia and natives.

== Raid ==
Departing from Crown Point with four vessels and a number of bateaux on 2 June 1760. A day later they landed fifty Rangers under Lieutenant Robert Holmes at Missisquoi Bay with orders to raid the French post known as 'Wigwam Martinique' on the Yamaska River east of the Richelieu river. Another four Rangers were also dispatched overland to Quebec with a letter for Murray. A diversion was created - several vessels commanded by Captain Alexander Grant seconded to the Rangers from the 77th Highlanders attempted to distract the French further down the lake. Rogers and the remaining 213 men crossed to the Northwest shore of Lake Champlain the next day and landed near Chazy River. Despite the diversion Bougainville soon learned of the Rangers location and sent out a party of 350 French, Canadian militia and Indians led by a Pierre Pepin LaForce to ambush the Rangers along the lake's shore.

=== Battle of Pointe Au Fer ===
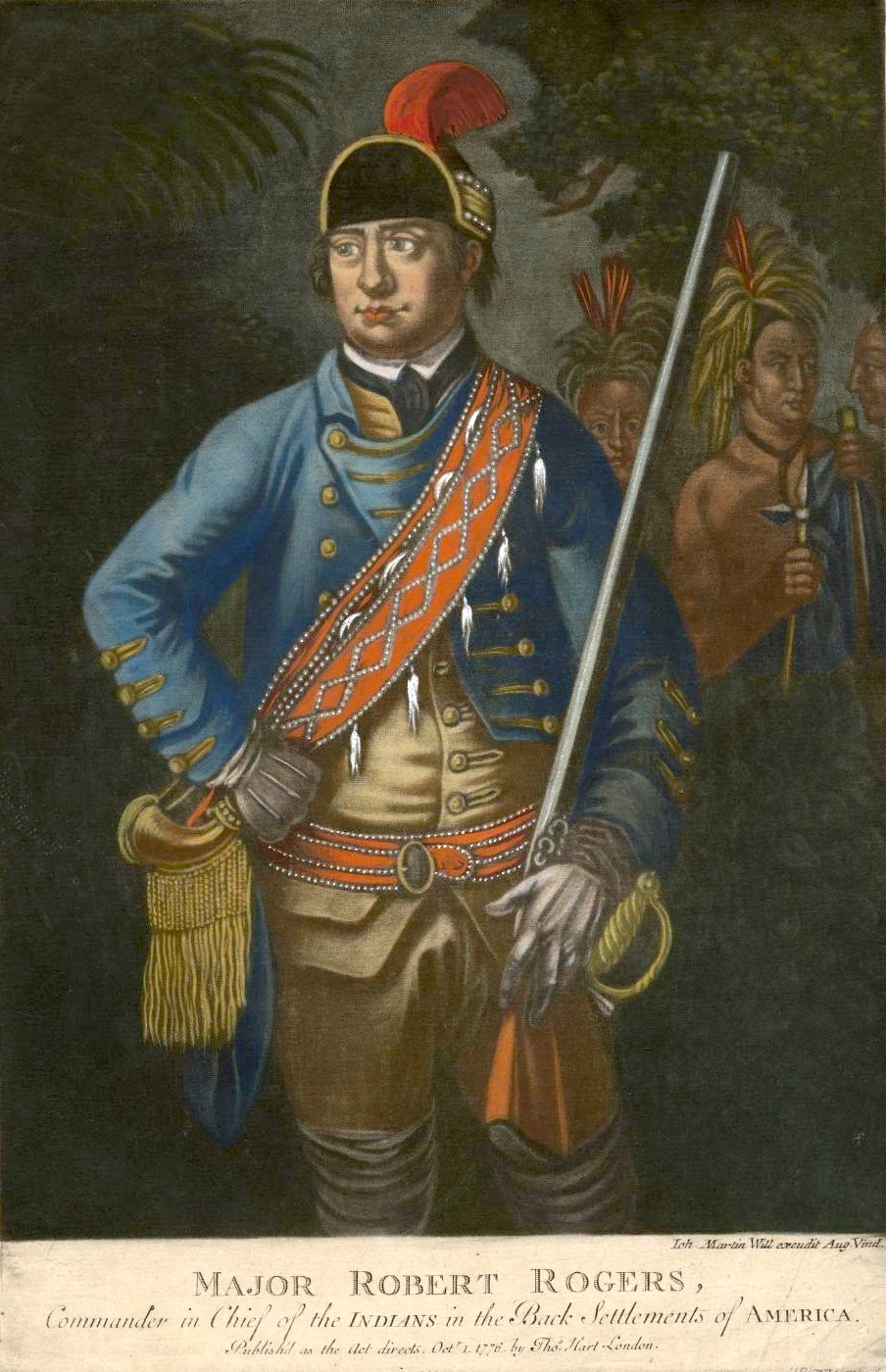
Robert Rogers, the founding leader and namesake of Rogers' Rangers

While his scouts relayed the probable point of attack the Rangers and Light Infantry held a site on the Pointe Au Fer Peninsula on the shore of Kings Bay. On his left lay the shore with his whale boats drawn up. On his right was a bog - Rogers dispatched a force of seventy Rangers to fall upon the rear via Catfish Bay if the French were to attack.

On 6 June in the morning, La Force ambushed the Rangers and attempted to drive them against the Lake shore and trap them. Outnumbered nearly three to one Rogers' 144 men managed to hold off the French long enough for the seventy Rangers that had successfully advanced through the bog to fall upon on the French rear. Rogers at the same time led the main body of Rangers forward and soon forced the French force to retreat in a Westerly direction. The Rangers harried the French for a mile before the latter took refuge in a cedar swamp and a huge rainstorm ended any further combat.

In the three hour combat the Rangers had lost twenty four casualties of which seven were initially killed. another seven would later die of their wounds. Of the highest was company commander Captain Noah Johnson, who had been badly wounded in three places. The French had suffered nearly fifty casualties including La Force who was mortally wounded in the chest. In the aftermath Rangers gathered 34 firearms and three Native scalps.

=== Sainte-Thérèse ===
The Rangers regrouped on the Isle La Motte and a were reinforced by a number of Stockbridge Indians. On 9 June 222 Rangers and Indians landed at the mouth of the Chazy River and marched north parallel to the West bank of the Richelieu to Fort Saint Jean. Rogers soon learned the French had heavily reinforced the fort and his reconnaissance unit was fired upon by outlying sentries. Rogers seeing that the fort was aware of his presence realised it be foolish to assault. He now marched for Fort Chambly in a night march further downriver but came across Sainte-Thérèse, a stockaded post and a village with two major storehouses at the upper end of the Chambly rapids five miles south of the Fort Chambly. Realising the Sainte-Thérèse's importance Rogers decided on an attack.

Rogers reconnoitred the place at 8am on June 16 and found it lightly manned. As the day wore on they then found most of the occupants busy carting hay into the fort. Rogers and some of his men crept close to the fort while other detachments silently approached the surrounding farmhouses.

Rogers and a few men rushed the gates while a haycart was passing through. Then the men rushed into the stockade and surprised the men inside. The French were caught completely off guard - within less than ten minutes the Rangers had captured twenty four soldiers without a shot being fired. Outside the rest of the Rangers seized another 78 soldiers and civilians in the outlying houses. A few civilians managed to escape to warn Fort Chambly.

In the meantime Rogers ordered that Sainte-Thérèse be plundered and burned - the village, stockade, boats, canoes, wagons, supplies and livestock were burned or destroyed and anything of value was taken. Rogers' captives of women, and children were set free on the road to Montreal. Rogers interrogated the prisoners and learned that Sainte-Thérèse was a vital link to communications with Île aux Noix. It was also used to supply all the military posts along the Richelieu river. They were unloaded at Chambly, then reloaded by bateaux at Sainte-Thérèse and transported to Saint Jean and Île aux Noix. Rogers realised that an attempt on Fort Chambly which had been reinforced, was not worth the risk. No casualties were sustained on either side during the raid;"Rogers left some humorous messages for the French, and Rogers took with him twenty seven prisoners in total.

=== Withdrawal ===
The Rangers departed and crossed the Richelieu and returned to Lake Champlain by a route East of the river on a detour that led past Ile Aux Noix. They headed for Windmill Point to rendezvous with Grant and his ships. As they came across along the shores of the Missisquoi Bay they noticed a large a body of troops pursuing them. Roger's advance party engaged in a similar number which preceded a force in excess of 800 men out from Île aux Noix. The Rangers managed to ambush them and the French were beaten off. Realising the numbers Rogers quickened his march, so much so that the French prisoners could not keep up pace so Rogers ordered their breeches cut off so their pace could quicken. Having arrived at Windmill Point, Rogers sent the prisoners and a contingent of fifty soldiers along with his intelligence report to Crown Point, Rogers and the rest of the men waited for Holmes' force.

On June 21 Rogers soon met up with Holmes and his men - they were unable to find the 'Wigwam Martinique' so had to turn back. Just as they departed the French began to arrive in significant numbers on the shore but as the Rangers rowed away they were well clear of them. Two days after their departure the force celebrated their largely successful campaign at Chimney Point.

== Aftermath ==
In contrast to the Saint Francis Raid - there was no slaughter at Sainte-Thérèse and the Natives held back on taking scalps. Rogers saw that there were no English scalps decorating the village - what's more the village was Canadian, not a native settlement.

The raid was Rogers' most successful - the Rangers had only suffered losses in the Pointe Au Fer action - in the raid itself they suffered none. The raid left a telling mark from both the point of view of the British and the French. Amherst was delighted with the result and praised Rogers - the British took over 100 soldiers and militia captive, burned or captured valuable supplies. In addition they had gained vast knowledge on the French defensives up to Montreal. The raid proved a shock to the French, demonstrating Roger's ability to do so much harm deep into their territory. In the aftermath, the raid forced some militias to desert and many natives to abandon their cause for France. Lévis attempted to raise morale but this had little effect.

Amherst's three pronged assault on Montreal began in July. Rogers and his Rangers were part of William Haviland's advance up Lake Champlain. After Roger's attack, the Richelieu River forts were further reinforced by Bougainville which came to some 3,000 regulars, Canadians and natives.

The Rangers would be heavily involved in the reduction of Ile Aux Noix as well as Forts Saint Jean and Chambly before Montreal surrendered on 8 September. After this triumph sustaining little loss Amherst selected Rogers for an expedition to the western French posts — Fort Detroit, Fort Michilimackinac, Fort Ouiatenon and others. This was the first British expedition into the French held Great Lakes region in almost a hundred years. The mission was a huge success, rounding off what Rogers called the most glorious year in the history of the British Empire.

== Bibliography ==
- Bellico, Russell Paul (1999). Chronicles of Lake Champlain: journeys in war and peace. Purple Mountain Press. ISBN 9780916346713.
- Chet, Guy (2003). Conquering the American Wilderness: The Triumph of European Warfare in Colonial Northeast. Univ of Massachusetts Press. ISBN 9781558493827.
- Frazier, Patrick (1994). The Mohicans of Stockbridge. University of Nebraska Press. ISBN 9780803268821.
- Gallay, Alan (2015). Colonial Wars of North America, 1512–1763 (Routledge Revivals): An Encyclopedia Routledge Revivals. Routledge. ISBN 9781317487197.
- Huber, Thomas M, ed. (2004). Compound Warfare: That Fatal Knot. University Press of the Pacific. ISBN 9781410215307.
- Lock, John D (1998). To Fight with Intrepidity: The Complete History of the U.S. Army Rangers, 1622 to Present. Pocket Books. ISBN 9780671015282.
- Loescher, Burt Garfield (2009) [1946]. The history of Rogers' rangers, Volume 1. Heritage Books Inc. ISBN 9780788417412.
- Nester, William R (2000). The First Global War: Britain, France, and the Fate of North America, 1756–1775. Greenwood Publishing Group. ISBN 9780275967710.
- Parkman, Texas; Parkman, Francis; Levin, David (1983). France and England in North America: Count Frontenac and New France under Louis XIV A half-century of conflict. Montcalm and Wolfe. Library of America. ISBN 9780940450110.
- Roby, Luther (2008). Reminiscences of the French War With Robert Rogers' Journal and a Memoir of General Stark. Heritage Books. ISBN 9780788446573.
- Ross, John F (2009). War on the Run: The Epic Story of Robert Rogers and the Conquest of America's First Frontier. Random House Publishing. ISBN 9780553906653.
- Snow, Dan (2009). Death Or Victory: The Battle for Quebec and the Birth of Empire. Harper Collins UK. ISBN 9780007286201.
