= James Rogers (British Army officer) =

- Born: c. 1726; Ireland
- Died: September 23, 1790; Sandhurst, Ontario
- Military career
- Branch: British Army
- Service years: 1754–1783
- Rank: Lieutenant-Colonel
- Units: Rogers' Rangers; Queen's Rangers; King's Rangers
- Commands: 2nd Battalion, King's Rangers
- Conflicts: French and Indian War; American War of Independence

James Rogers (c. 1726 – September 23, 1790) was an Irish-born soldier. He emigrated to America at an early age and became a frontiersman. He served with his brother Robert Rogers during the French and Indian War. He then served as a Loyalist leader during the American War of Independence and later settled in Ontario in Canada.

== Early life ==
Rogers was born to James and Mary Rogers in Ireland, and they immigrated to the Province of Massachusetts Bay around 1729. Robert Rogers was born in 1731 and a third brother Richard in 1733. During the French and Indian War, he served in Rogers' Rangers, a provincial Ranger Corps raised by his brother Robert Rogers.

== French and Indian War ==
He was with Robert in the Battle on Snowshoes in January 1757, the Siege of Louisbourg (1758), the Ile Saint-Jean Campaign and the Battle of the Plains of Abraham (1759). In 1765, he was granted the township of Kent, a 26,000-acre (110 km^{2}) parcel in Vermont later known as the townships of Londonderry and Windham.

== American War of Independence ==
In the American War of Independence, he commanded the 2nd Battalion of the King's Rangers, thereby forfeiting his lands in Vermont. In 1784, he led a party of about 300 disbanded King's Rangers and their families to the Third Township of Cataraqui, later known as the Township of Fredericksburgh, in Lennox County, Ontario, where they were granted land. Rogers, who first settled in Fredericksburgh, where he became lieutenant-colonel of the militia, lived for a time in Prince Edward County, Ontario but returned to Fredericksburgh before his death on September 23, 1790.

== Vermont negotiations ==
Between 1780 and 1783, Rogers was heavily involved in the negotiations with Ethan Allen and Thomas Chittenden to have Vermont come back under the British Crown. Rogers and Allen were both large land owners in Vermont, which had not been admitted to the newly formed United States because both New York and New Hampshire claimed it as their own, and declared independence in 1777. These negotiations resulted in Allen being accused of treason, but no formal charges were ever made.

Plaque at Sandhurst on PH33 at the Anglican Church

== Family and notable descendants ==
James married Margaret McGregor (1740–1793), daughter of Presbyterian Minister, Reverend David McGregore of Derry, New Hampshire, in March 1760. His second son, James Rogers III (1764–1841), petitioned the state of Vermont and reclaimed the townships of Londonderry in 1795 and Windham in 1797. His third son, David McGregor Rogers (1772–1824), assisted in the petitions and became a member of the Upper Canada Parliament. There was another David Rogers, the first son of then Captain James Rogers, who died at 4 years old in 1766 and is buried in East Derry, New Hampshire.
