= St. Francis raid =

1759 battle

St Francis raid
- Part of the French and Indian War
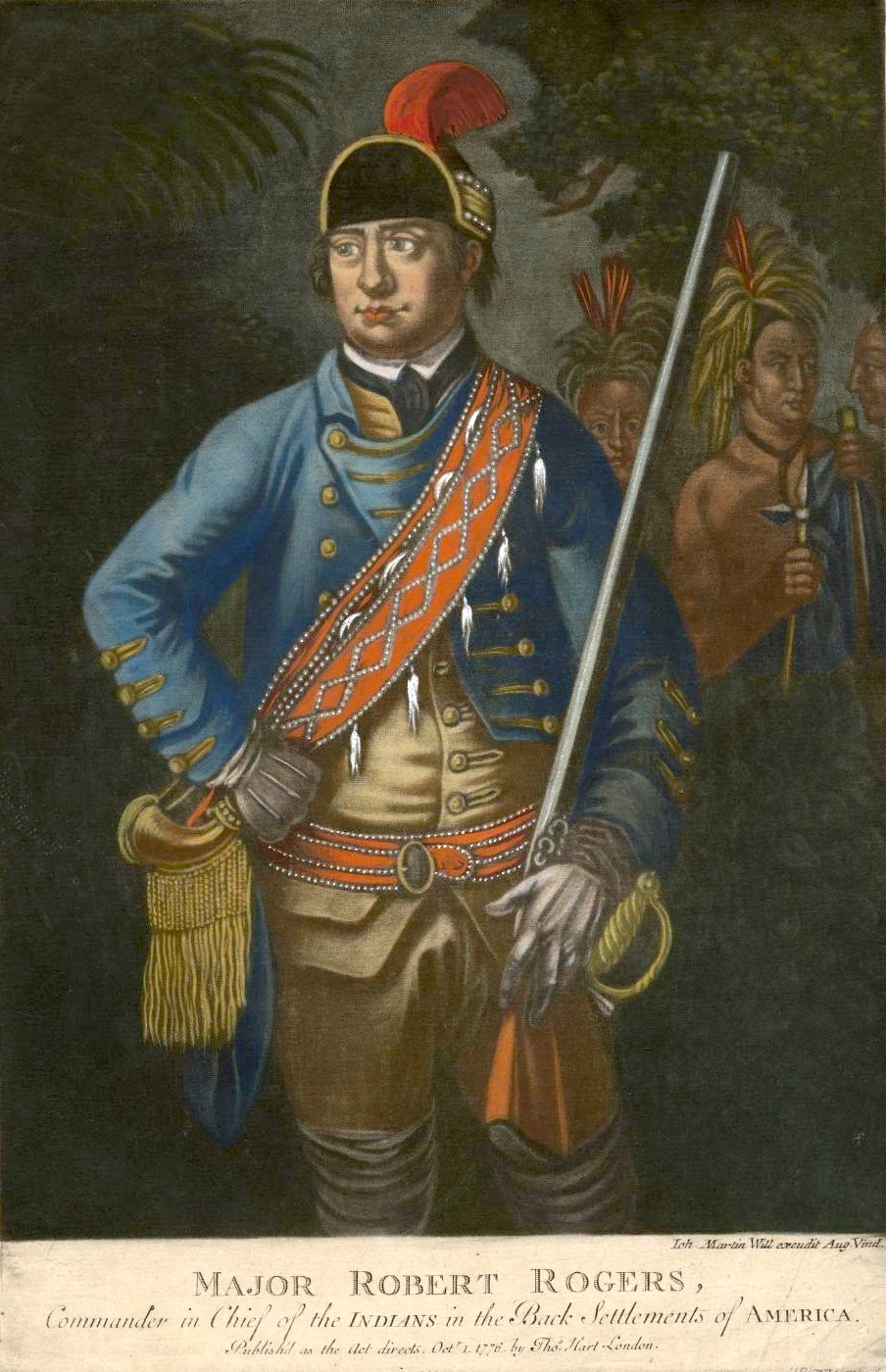
- Robert Rogers in a 1776 painting, the only known portrait from the lifetime of Rogers.
Date	October 4, 1759
Location	Saint-François-du-Lac, Quebec 46°03′58″N 72°49′34″W
Result	British victory

Belligerents
France; Abenaki	British America

Commanders and leaders
Unknown (village defense); Jean-Daniel Dumas (pursuit); François-Charles de Bourlamaque	Robert Rogers

Strength
Unknown	142

Casualties and losses
30-200 killed 5-20 captured	Assault: 1 killed and 7 wounded Retreat: 40 killed and 10 captured

The St. Francis raid was an attack in the French and Indian War by Robert Rogers on St. Francis, near the southern shore of the Saint Lawrence River in what was then the French province of Canada, on October 4, 1759. Rogers and about 140 men entered the village, which was reportedly occupied primarily by women, children, and the elderly, early that morning, slaughtered many of the inhabitants where they lay, shot down many who attempted to flee, and then burned the village. Rogers reported killing as many as 200 people, while French reports placed the number closer to thirty, mainly women and children. One of Rogers' men was killed, and seven were wounded.

Rogers and his men endured significant hardships to reach the village from the British base at Fort Crown Point in present-day New York and even more hardship afterwards. Chased by the French and vengeful Indians and short on rations, Rogers and his men returned to Crown Point via the Connecticut River valley. Missteps in caching food stores for the expedition's use led to starvation, and some of Rogers' men were reportedly driven to cannibalism in order to survive. About one third of the raid's participants did not return.

Reports of the raid from the Thirteen Colonies were unapologetic, as St. Francis had long been a place from which the natives raided colonial settlements as far south as Massachusetts, and Rogers reported a large number of scalps decorating the main village buildings.

== Background ==
The 1759 summer campaign season in the French and Indian War was a resounding success for the forces of Great Britain. Fort Ticonderoga was captured in July, as was Fort Niagara, and Quebec was under siege. General Jeffery Amherst, the victor at Ticonderoga, had little news of the situation before Quebec, and he required accurate intelligence before deciding whether a move of his army along Lake Champlain was warranted. To that end he sent one party of rangers out on August 7 to reach General James Wolfe near Quebec by travelling up the Kennebec River, a long and roundabout route that took the party nearly one month to complete. Although this party successfully travelled the route in both directions, the time taken meant that their news was effectively useless to Amherst due to the lateness of the season.

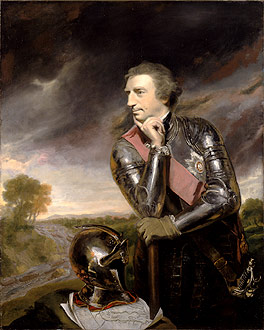
General Jeffrey Amherst.

Amherst sent a second party, consisting of two officers from the 17th Regiment and a handful of Stockbridge Indians on a route from the northern end of Lake Champlain toward Quebec via the primarily Abenaki village of St. Francis. In addition to dispatches for Wolfe, this party, led by Captain Quinton Kennedy, had as a sort of cover for their movements instructions to make offers of friendship to the Abenakis in exchange for their non-participation in the hostilities between the British and French. They carried a belt of wampum as part of this offer.

The village of St. Francis, which was regarded by many as an Abenaki village, was in fact inhabited by a diverse community. In addition to the Abenakis who arrived after Father Rale's War, members of other tribes that had been driven from New England in earlier conflicts lived there, as did white settlers who had either by choice or by capture adopted native ways. The village consisted of what were then typical European-style homes centered around a church. It had a reputation among American colonists to the south as the launching point for raids into communities as far south as Massachusetts. Robert Rogers was a teenager in New Hampshire at the time of one such raid in 1746.

== Kennedy party captured ==
Kennedy and his party left Fort Crown Point on August 8. Word reached Amherst on August 19 that they had successfully reached Missisquoi Bay at the northern end of the lake in spite of French ships patrolling the area. French General François-Charles de Bourlamaque, in command of the French defenses at Île-aux-Noix, was alerted to the presence of Kennedy's party and intended movements by the arrival of British deserters on August 22. Bourlamaque immediately sent out patrols and alerted the St. Francis Abenakis to do the same. On August 24 Kennedy's party was surrounded and captured by the Abenakis; despite attempts at bribery and negotiation, they were turned over to General Louis-Joseph de Montcalm in Quebec. Amherst learned of this on September 10 when a letter from Montcalm reached him indicating that the two British officers were his prisoners. Montcalm noted that the men were not in uniform, a tacit implication that Montcalm could have treated them as spies and hanged them, rather than treating them as prisoners of war.

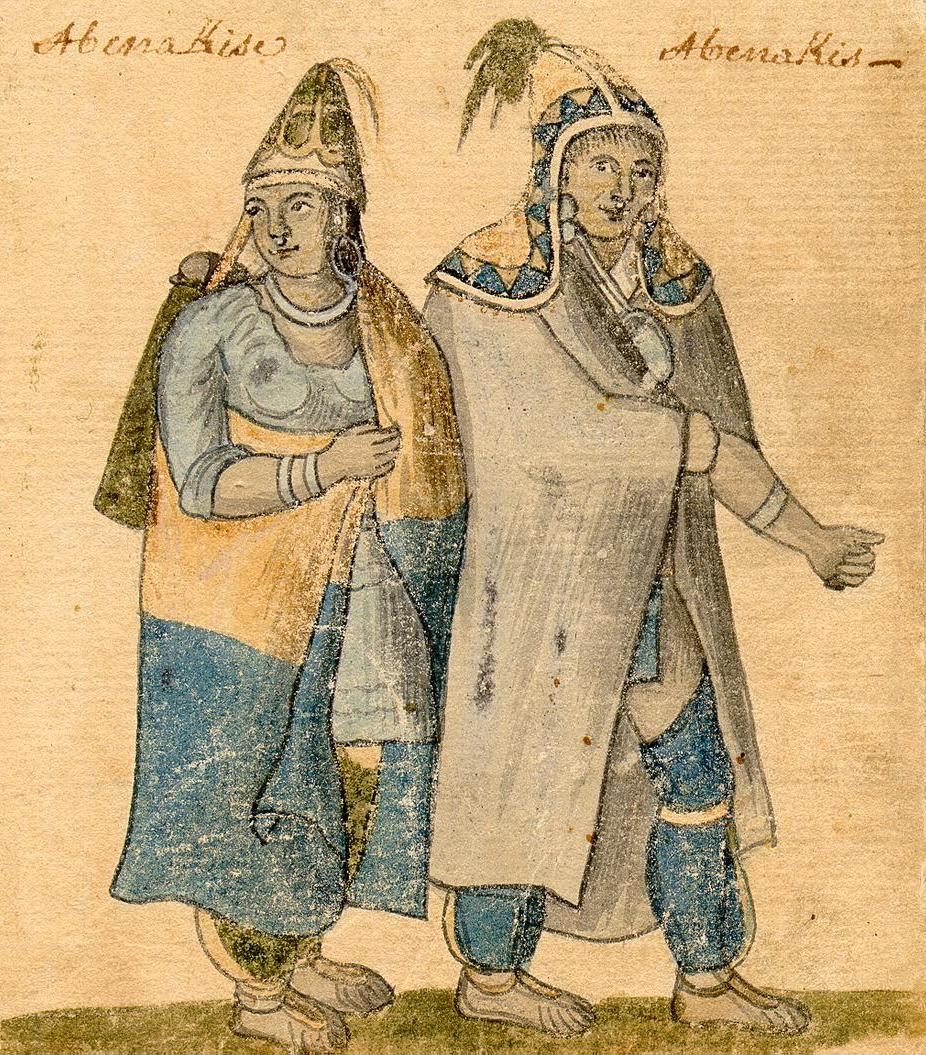
18th-century depiction of an Abenaki couple

Accounts circulated within the British camps that the two officers had been mistreated by the Abenaki, including the possibility of ritual torture. This heightened anger and resentment among the British, and Amherst, apparently upset over the Abenaki behaviour, decided to send Robert Rogers on a retaliatory mission. Rogers assembled a company of 220 men, drawn in part from his ranger companies but also including men he selected from the regular army. A significant number of his men were Stockbridge Indians bent on freeing their compatriots, and others were Mohegans from his ranger corps.

Amherst's orders to Rogers on September 13 included the following: "Remember the barbarities that have been committed by the enemy's Indian scoundrels on every occasion, where they had an opportunity of showing their infamous cruelties on the King's subjects, which they have done without mercy. Take your revenge, but don't forget ... it is my orders that no women or children are killed or hurt."

== Expedition starts ==
The expedition left Crown Point on the night of September 13. Its departure was not a well-kept secret, although Rogers and Amherst were the only ones to know its actual destination, and Amherst took steps to publish false instructions about Rogers' movements. The party, occupying 17 whaleboats, rowed north. Due to heightened French patrolling in the wake of Kennedy's mission, they made slow progress. The early days brought some notable disappointments, as more than 40 men turned back due to a variety of accidents and illnesses. Rogers reached the head of Missisquoi Bay early on September 23, where the boats and supplies for the return trip were concealed and left with two Indians as guards.

Unfortunately for Rogers, his landing had not gone unnoticed. Although he had successfully eluded the naval patrols, the British victory at Quebec on September 13 had resulted in the movement of French troops toward Lake Champlain, and there were increased French patrols in the area. Bourlamaque had recently personally scouted Missisquoi Bay and declared it a good place from which the British could launch an attack. While French scouting expeditions the previous days had not turned up anything noteworthy, one party sent out the very day Rogers landed found a British oar floating in the bay. The next day, a larger party of scouts, coincidentally led by Oliver de la Durantaye, who had battled Rogers in 1758, discovered the boats. Some were destroyed and others were taken by the French for their use. Bourlamaque learned on September 25 that a sizeable British force was in the area, and immediately raised the alarm to Montreal and sent out detachments in force to scour the countryside. He also concluded that the force might be targeting St. Francis in retaliation for Kennedy's capture, and stationed several hundred men near the site where the boats were hidden to set up an ambush in the event of Rogers' return.

== Change of plans ==
Rogers at first chose a course that headed primarily east in order to avoid both the French defenses at Île-aux-Noix and the more northerly route that Kennedy had followed. This took the party through extremely swampy terrain. Two days into the trek, the two Indian guards brought the news that the boats had been taken by the French. This change of circumstance led Rogers to hold a council to discuss their options. As they were behind enemy lines and far from any support, all their options were relatively poor. Rogers reported that they decided to continue with the mission and then to "attempt a retreat (the only way we could think of) by way of No. 4". As part of this daring plan, Rogers sent Lieutenant Andrew McMullen and a half dozen men overland to Crown Point with instructions to deliver a cache of food to the confluence of the Connecticut and Ammonoosuc rivers, a point about 60 miles (97 km) north of Number Four.

McMullen and his men made the overland trek to Crown Point (more than 100 miles (160 km) over difficult terrain) in nine days, arriving on October 3. Amherst immediately sent a ranger, Lieutenant Samuel Stevens, to Number Four with specific orders to deliver supplies to the agreed rendezvous point and to wait there until either Rogers and his men appeared or Stevens felt there was no probability of their appearance.

Rogers and his men spent the next week slogging through swampy terrain, covering a distance Rogers estimated at 50 miles (80 km) during which they were rarely dry. The conditions were so difficult that the French pursuit gave up, never discovering who they were looking for. On October 3 they finally reached dry land along the banks of the St. Francis River. The village of St. Francis lay downstream and across the river and was closer than Rogers had realized. When his men began chopping down trees to construct rafts for use in crossing the river, the sounds of the axes were heard in the village but were disregarded. Rogers and his men eventually moved several miles upstream to locate a suitable ford. Because of this, he reported that the crossing "was attended with no small difficulty", with swiftly flowing water 5 feet (1.5 m) deep.

== Raid ==
Many of the Abenaki men had been called out by Governor Vaudreuil to assist in tracking down the mysterious British force, which had seemingly vanished. On October 3 Vaudreuil wrote to Bourlamaque that he had called on the Abenakis and some local militia to set up an ambush on the Yamaska River, the route Kennedy had used on his expedition.

By the time Rogers and his company saw the smoke from the fires of St. Francis late on October 3, his force had been reduced to 142 men, and their rations had been completely exhausted. That night, Rogers donned Indian dress and sneaked into the village. There he observed that the natives were dancing, apparently a war dance in preparation for a major scouting expedition. One news report claimed that Rogers learned that this expedition was to look for the unknown British force that might be in the area.

Rogers was not the only one of his party to enter the village. According to Abenaki oral tradition, a strange native identifying himself as a Mahican (as the Stockbridge Indians were also known) entered the village and circulated warnings that it was about to be attacked. A significant number of its inhabitants withdrew from the village in response to this warning, as many of the menfolk had answered Vaudreuil's call.

At 3:00 am on October 4 Rogers marched his men near the village and then divided them into companies for the attack. The best shooters were placed to fire on anyone trying to escape the village. At about 5 am the attack began. In complete surprise they fell on the village inhabitants, many sleeping in their houses after the long night of dancing. There was little to no organized defense as Rogers and his men broke down doors and shot, tomahawked, or bayoneted people where they lay. Amherst's order to avoid killing women and children was lost in the frenzy. Any resistance was quickly dealt with, and many who tried to escape were shot by the sentries posted outside the village. Some inhabitants managed to reach their canoes and attempted to escape across the river; they were chased down and the canoes were sunk with their occupants, which included children.

After sunrise, Rogers ordered the village burned down. As the houses burned it became clear that some of the inhabitants had attempted to escape the carnage by hiding in the attic spaces, which then became death traps. The church was burned, but not before it was ransacked for its more valuable trappings, and at least one priest refused quarter and perished in the flames. The only structures not destroyed were the storehouses, which contained corn that Rogers and his men would require as sustenance during their retreat.

Only a few of the village's inhabitants at the time the raid began survived the experience. Robert Kirkwood, a Scotsman who had been mistreated by Shawnee earlier in the war, wrote that "This was I believe the bloodiest scene in all America, our revenge being complete."

Rogers interrogated some of the captives and learned that large companies of French and Indians were within easy marching distance, including a force of about 400 that were expected to arrive the next day. After a brief council, Rogers and his men agreed that the only reasonable means of retreat was to Number Four, a straight-line distance of about 200 miles (320 km) through uncharted wilderness. Rogers and his men gathered up as much of the stored corn as they could carry and set off to the south.

== Pursuit ==
News of the raid reached Trois-Rivières around noon on the day of the raid and travelled quickly throughout the province. The attack on loyal allies of the French had to be answered, in spite of the larger threats posed by the armies of Amherst and Wolfe. In a somewhat naive move, Bourlamaque sent a further 300 men to join the 400 already awaiting the return of Roger's men to their boats on Missisquoi Bay, unaware that Rogers knew his boats were lost and had planned a different route of retreat. Vaudreuil also sent additional native reinforcement to assist in scouting the area around the bay.

In Trois-Rivières a small force of experienced fighters under Captain Jean-Daniel Dumas mustered to chase after Rogers. Going first to Yamaska to pick up some forces that had gathered there, they finally reached St. Francis on October 5, more than a day behind Rogers. A few men came out of the woods to join the party; then when Dumas had surveyed the carnage, plans were formulated to give chase.

Roger's force, burdened by supplies and prisoners, made fairly good progress, covering the 70 miles (110 km) from St. Francis to Lake Memphremagog in about eight days. At this point, rations began to run out again, and Rogers made a critical decision. Somewhere near present-day Sherbrooke, Rogers broke the party up into companies of ten to twenty men, so that they might forage and hunt more effectively. While each party might be able more readily to supply itself with food, they also made easier targets for the pursuit.

Several of these small companies were tracked down by determined pursuers. According to one French account, some forty of Rogers' men were killed and ten were brought as prisoners back to St. Francis, although historian Frank McLynn says that the expedition had 3 officers and 46 other ranks killed or captured. At St. Francis, some of the prisoners "fell a victim to the fury of the Indian women, notwithstanding the efforts the Canadians could make to save them", suggesting that they were not subjected to ritual torture or killing. Two of Rogers' men survived after being spirited away by a sympathetic "English Indian" to the relative safety of Trois-Rivières.

== Starvation ==
The journals of the later stages of the expedition provide only a fragmented picture of what occurred to those of Rogers' force who eluded the pursuit, as men subjected to exhaustion, exposure, and starvation are unlikely to make good reporters. The journal kept by Rogers was relatively terse concerning the trek to the Connecticut River, with "many days tedious march over steep rocky mountains or thro' wet dirty swamps, with the terrible attendants of fatigue and hunger". They reported eating bark, roots, mushrooms, and gnawed fragments of flesh off beaver skins. One widely reported account of cannibalism was recounted to historian Thomas Mante by Lieutenant George Campbell, in which his party of men came upon scalped remains trapped in logs on a small river, "devouring part of them raw" because they were too impatient to wait for a fire. Robert Kirkwood, in a relatively unadorned account, tells how Rogers killed one of their prisoners, an Indian woman, butchered the remains, and divided them among his men.

After nine days of difficult travel, the group led by Rogers reached the appointed rendezvous on October 20. He found there a burning fire and no provisions. Lieutenant Stevens, whom Amherst had sent to Number Four to deliver the provisions to the rendezvous, had camped below the rendezvous point, and men from his party went to the rendezvous daily and fired their muskets to see if anyone was nearby. After several days of this, Stevens gave up, eventually returning to Crown Point on October 30. Amherst noted in his own journal that Stevens should probably have remained longer than he did. Rogers took the disappointment in stride. Leaving most of his emaciated company behind with promises to return with supplies in ten days, he and three men descended the Connecticut River on rafts, reaching Number Four on October 31, where he was reportedly barely able to walk. Supplies were immediately dispatched upriver, which Rogers reported as reaching his starving men "the tenth [day] after I left them".

== Aftermath ==
On November 2, French scouts on the shores of Missisquoi Bay heard English voices. Investigating in force, they discovered five English survivors of the St. Francis raid, whom they took prisoner. These men reported that at least one more small company was in the area; three more men were found, whose throats were slit when they were found to be carrying human flesh.

November 2 was also the day that Amherst learned that Rogers had executed the raid. The account, delivered by a French officer under a truce flag, included mention that women and children had been slain, an observation Amherst discounted. Rogers' second in command arrived at Crown Point on November 7 with Rogers' report. That same afternoon an Indian from the expedition appeared at Crown Point with word that a party of Rogers' men was on the far side of the lake. The party consisted of six rangers, three prisoners, and a white woman freed from captivity, as well as a large amount of gathered loot. Amherst replied to Rogers' report with approval: "... every step you inform me you had taken has been very well Judged and Deserves my full approbation."

News of the raid was first treated with skepticism in the Thirteen Colonies, but when confirmation came from Rogers himself, he and his men were treated as heroes. The New Hampshire Gazette devoted considerable space to coverage of the exploits of one of the province's famous fighters. The scope of the feat served to raise Rogers' popularity, even while he still worried about the fate of all of his men. Many of the village's residents who were not present at the time of the raid continued to serve with the French forces in the war, settling in other native communities along the Saint Lawrence. The village itself was eventually rebuilt. Rogers and his rangers would go on to raid Sainte-Thérèse the following year.
