= Nathaniel Hutchins =

American military person (1742–1832)

Capt. Nathaniel Hutchins (October 11, 1742 – January 10, 1832) was one of Rogers' Rangers—initially, a provincial company from the colony of New Hampshire; he served, for five years, during the French and Indian War.

"Later, as First Lieutenant in the 9th company of Stark's 74th regiment, Hutchins served in Capt. (later, Major General) Henry Dearborn's company in the expedition against Quebec (in Colonel Benedict Arnold's detachment). A thousand men marched to Newburyport, Massachusetts -- where they embarked for Quebec on September 18, 1775. During the campaign, Lt. Hutchins and Capt. Dearborn, as well as others, were captured at Quebec on December 31, 1775.

On April 4, 1777, the New Hampshire House promoted Lt. Hutchins to Captain; he served in Col. Cilley's regiment. His company, with sixteen or more men from Weare, New Hampshire, was in the first New Hampshire regiment in John Sullivan's brigade; it saw action, under Washington, at the Battle of Trenton (December 26, 1776) and the Battle of Princeton (January 3, 1777). Capt. Hutchins was at the Battle of White Plains in New York (July 1778). The records indicate his absence for "illness" at Hartford, Connecticut, from November 1778 to April 1779. George Washington wrote from Valley Forge, on May 20, 1778, to Major General Heath of Boston as follows: "I shall direct a guard to relieve Capt. Hutchins at Reading[, Massachusetts]". Later, Hutchins was on furlough from October 1779 to the end of the year. He reported sick, again, the last two months of 1780; it appears that he retired from service pursuant to a general order of November 1, 1780.

His military record is as follows:

French and Indian War

- Ensign, Roger's Rangers, New Hampshire Detachment under Cpt. John Stark, 1759

American Revolution

- 2nd Lieutenant, 1st N.H. Regiment under Col. John Stark, April 23, 1775 (Battle of Bunker Hill, June 17, 1775)
- 1st Lieutenant, 5th Continental Infantry, January 1, 1776
- Captain Lieutenant, September 25, 1776
- Captain Lieutenant 1st N.H., November 8, 1776
- Captain, April 4, 1777
- retired January 1, 1781

His headstone has inscribed upon it: "Nathaniel Hutchins died 10 Jan. 1832, aged 89. He served in the French War 5 years, was Commanding Officer in the Revolutionary War, and was in the Battle of Bunker Hill in 1775." His grave bears a Revolutionary War flag.
