= King's Rangers =

British light auxiliary unit of the American Revolution

- Active: 1779-1783
- Country: Great Britain
- Allegiance: British Army
- Branch: Loyalist provincial unit
- Type: Auxiliaries; Light infantry
- Role: Close combat Irregular warfare Raiding; Reconnaissance; Tracking
- Size: 2 Battalions
- Nickname: King's American Rangers
- Engagements: American Revolutionary War

Commanders
- Notable commanders: Colonel Robert Rogers; Lieutenant Colonel James Rogers; Captain-Lieutenant James Breakenridge; Captain-Lieutenant Azariah Pritchard; Captain-Lieutenant Henry Ruiter

The King's Rangers, also known as the King's American Rangers, was a Loyalist provincial ranger unit that specialized in close combat, irregular warfare, raiding, reconnaissance, and tracking. It was raised in Nova Scotia for service during the American Revolutionary War.

== Formation ==
After Colonel Robert Rogers left the Queen's Rangers in 1777 he went to Nova Scotia. He obtained approval from General Sir Henry Clinton to raise the King's Rangers in 1779. The formation of the Rangers was authorized to contain two battalions, each divided into 10 companies.

== Early actions ==
By September 1779 recruitment for the unit was underway and the Rangers were stationed at Fort St. Johns on the Richelieu River. Robert Rogers assumed command of the unit with his brother, James Rogers, commanding the second battalion of the Rangers. Despite Robert nominally being in command of the Rangers, he was inefficient and the burden of recruitment often fell to his brother.

Despite recruitment issues being faced by the Rangers, the second battalion was active in scouting and recruiting along the frontiers of New York, Lake Champlain and the area that was to later become Vermont. They also engaged in the taking of Patriot prisoners of war.

A year after the formation of the Rangers the area in which they were able to recruit from was extended with the permission of General Sir Frederick Haldimand. Due to the relatively small size of the Rangers, Haldimand restricted their operational capabilities to conducting reconnaissance for other corps, constructing fortifications, executing general garrison duties, assisting refugees in Quebec, aiding the escape of Loyalist families, and guarding prisoners of war.

== Later engagements ==
In February 1781, a number of soldiers from the Rangers were involved in the capture of Patriot leader Peleg Wadsworth. The Rangers were disbanded in 1783, having seen little to no action during the conflict.

== Disbandment ==
After the Revolutionary War, some officers and men of the Rangers were granted tracts of land for farming in Queens County and Kings County, Prince Edward Island, British Canada. The Rangers were reactivated during the War of 1812 and a large training camp was built in what is now the village of Pownal, complete with barracks, a field hospital and musketry range (of which the butts can still be seen on the shore of Pownal Bay).

== Notable officers ==
- Colonel Robert Rogers
- Lieutenant Colonel James Rogers
- Captain-Lieutenant James Breakenridge
- Captain-Lieutenant Azariah Pritchard
- Captain-Lieutenant Henry Ruiter
