= Battle of Mamaroneck =

1776 battle

Coordinates: 40°56.792′N 73°44.127′W

Battle of Mamaroneck (Skirmish of Heathcote Hill)
- Part of the American Revolutionary War
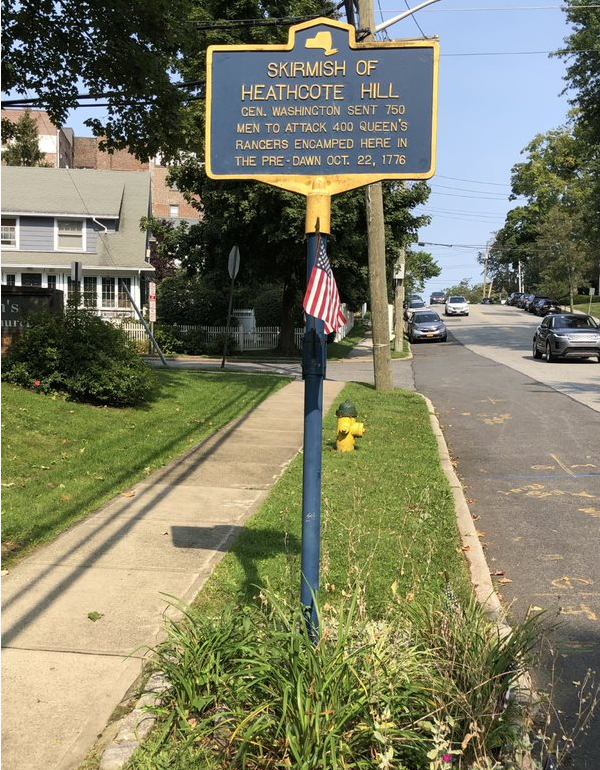
- Historical Marker on Fenimore Road in Mamaroneck
Date	October 22, 1776
Location	Mamaroneck, Westchester County, New York
Result	British victory

Belligerents
United States	Great Britain

Commanders and leaders
(United States) John Haslet	(Kingdom of Great Britain) Robert Rogers

Strength
750 men	400 men

Casualties and losses
3 killed 12 wounded	30 killed or wounded 36 captured

The Battle of Mamaroneck (also known as the Skirmish of Heathcote Hill) was a skirmish in the New York and New Jersey campaign of the American Revolutionary War fought on October 22, 1776, at Mamaroneck, Westchester County, New York.

Following the retreat of George Washington's Continental Army to White Plains, British General William Howe landed troops in Westchester County, intending to cut off Washington's escape route. To cover the eastern flank of his army, Howe ordered Major Robert Rogers and his Queen's Rangers (a Loyalist military unit) to seize the village of Mamaroneck which had been recently abandoned by the Continental Army. On the night of October 22, 750 men under Colonel John Haslet attacked the British encampment. Haslet's men achieved complete surprise, but Rogers' Rangers rallied and drove off the attackers. However, they suffered greater casualties than the Americans. Historian Otto Hufeland described the fight:

While at White Plains Washington was informed that the regiment of loyalists, recruited in the vicinity and commanded by the renegade Colonel Robert Rogers was encamped at Heathcote Hill in Mamaroneck. Lord Stirling at once ordered Colonel Haslet and Major Green with seven hundred and fifty men to attempt a surprise attack on the Rangers during the following night. Unfortunately the attack was made when the sentries were being changed and the surprise was not entirely successful, but the Rangers were “very roughly handled” as one of their historians admits, quite a number being killed and wounded. As a result of the raid the Americans brought back “a pair of colours, sixty stand of arms and a variety of plunder,” besides thirty-one prisoners, every one of whom was a “native of this government.”
