= Battle on Snowshoes =

1758 battle of the French and Indian War

- Part of the French and Indian War
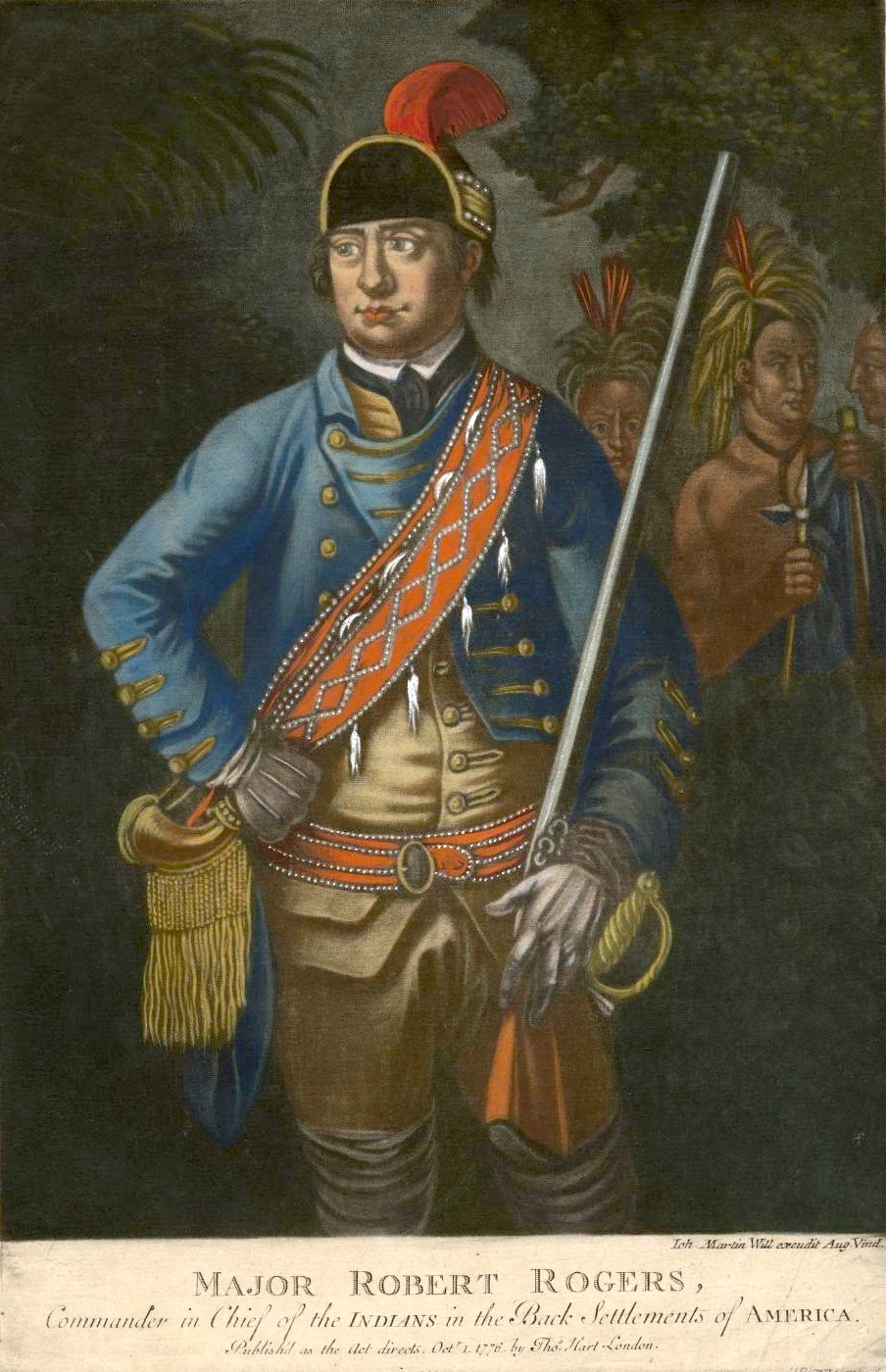
- 1776 portrait of Robert Rogers
Date	March 13, 1758
Location	Near Lake George, New York 43°25′34″N 73°42′44″W
Result	French victory

Belligerents
France	Great Britain

Commanders and leaders
Joseph de la Durantaye; Jean-Baptiste de Langy	Robert Rogers

Strength
300	181

Casualties and losses
8 killed 22 wounded	124 killed 7 captured

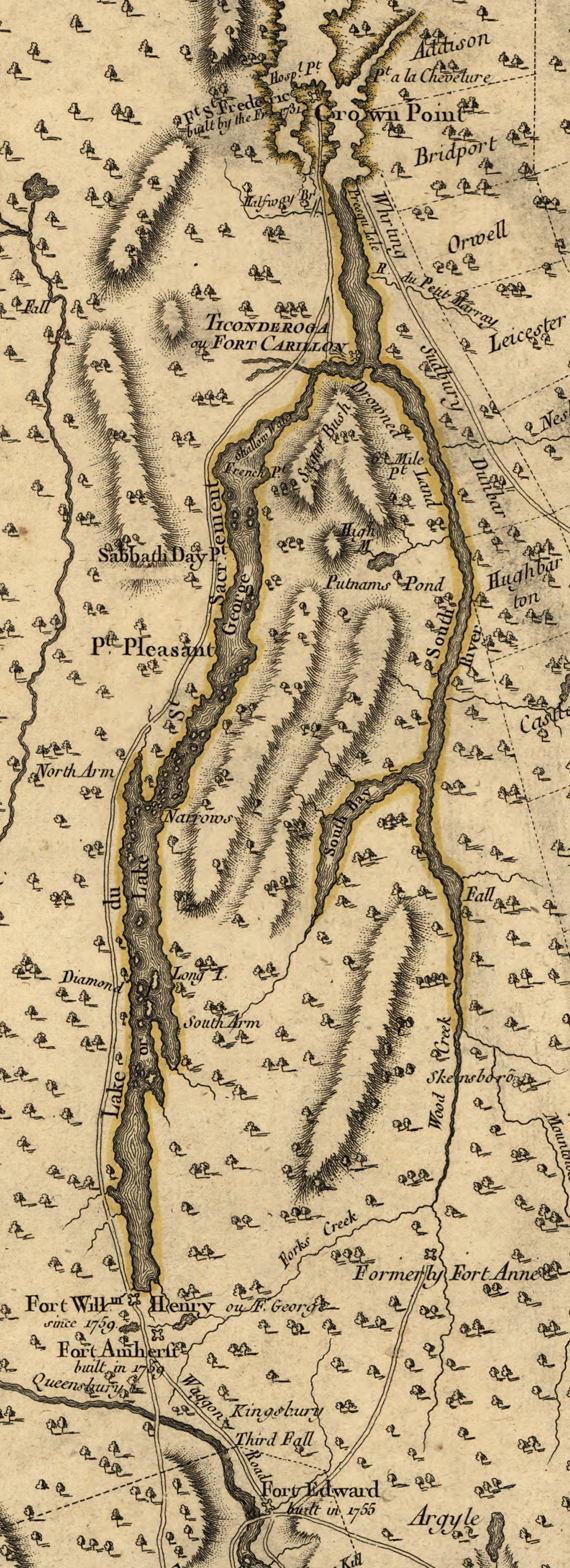
Detail from a 1777 map by John Montresor. In 1758, the road along the left side of Lake George did not exist. Forts Edward and William Henry are near the bottom of this map. This battle probably took place somewhere west of the hills near Sabbathday Point.

The Battle on Snowshoes was fought on March 13, 1758, during the French and Indian War. It was fought by a British force led by Captain Robert Rogers against French troops and Indians allied to France. The battle took place near Lake George, now in northern New York, but then in the frontier area between the British Province of New York and the French province of Canada. The battle was given its name because Rogers' troops wore snowshoes.

Rogers led a band of about 180 rangers and regulars out to scout French positions. The French commander at Fort Carillon had been alerted to their movement, and sent a force consisting mostly of Indians to meet them. In fierce fighting, Rogers' force was nearly destroyed, suffering over 130 casualties. The French believed that Rogers was killed in this action, as he was forced to abandon his regimental jacket, which contained his commission papers, during his escape from the scene.

This battle gave rise to the tale that Rogers escaped capture by sliding 400 feet (120 m) down a rockface to the frozen surface of Lake George. That rock is now known as Rogers Rock or Rogers Slide.

== Background ==
The French and Indian War broke out in 1754 between British and French colonists over territorial disputes along their colonial frontiers, and escalated the following year to include regular troops. By 1756, the French had enjoyed successes in most of their frontier battles against the British. Their only notable failure occurred when the British stopped their southward advance from Lake Champlain in the 1755 Battle of Lake George. From bases at Fort St. Frédéric (located at what is now Crown Point, New York) and Fort Carillon (known to the British as Fort Ticonderoga), the French and their Indian allies continued to scout and probe the British defenses on Lake George and the upper Hudson River. The British, who had fewer Indian allies, resorted to companies of colonial rangers for their scouting and reconnaissance activities. The ranger companies were organized and directed by Captain Robert Rogers, and eventually became known as Rogers' Rangers.

== Prelude ==
Captain Rogers was sent on a reconnaissance mission from Fort Edward northwards toward Fort Carillon on March 10, 1758. Lieutenant Colonel William Haviland, the fort's commander, had originally planned on 400 men taking part but reduced the number to 180, even though he had reason to believe the French knew of the expedition. The French had captured a man from an earlier expedition by Israel Putnam's Connecticut rangers and it was suspected that he had informed his captors of the British plans. Putnam's reconnaissance revealed that there were an estimated 600 Indians encamped near Fort Carillon.

The expedition was composed mostly of troops of Rogers' Rangers, but it also included a few volunteer soldiers from the British Army's 27th (Enniskillen) Regiment of Foot. On March 13, they wore snowshoes as they marched through snow four feet deep, with a rivulet to their left and a steep mountain separating them from Lake George to their right. They had stopped for a three-hour break when their advance guard spotted what Rogers reported as "ninety-six, chiefly Indians".

On March 12, Captain Louis-Philippe Le Dossu d'Hébécourt, the French commander at Fort Carillon, heard rumors from the encamped Indians that the British were nearing. He sent Ensign Durantaye with a company of 200 Nipissing Indians and about 20 Canadians in response to these reports, but they found nothing. The next day two Indian scouts reported that they had found tracks of an enemy party. Around noon on March 13, Durantaye led 100 men (again a mixed company of Indians and Canadians) out of the fort. These were followed shortly after by 200 Indians under Ensign de Langy.

Although the two French groups joined forces, Durantaye's company was about 100 yards (91 m) ahead of Langy's when they were spotted by Rogers' men.

== Battle ==
Rogers' men immediately set up an ambush. When Durantaye's men came within range at 14:00, the British opened fire, killing "above forty Indians", according to Rogers. Durantaye's force broke and retreated in disarray. Rogers and about half his men gave chase, critically forgetting to reload their muskets, while the others stopped to collect scalps. Langy's men, alerted by the gunfire, set up their own ambush. When Rogers' men arrived, the attack by Langy's force killed or wounded an estimated 50 men. The Rangers fought bravely, considering they were outnumbered and their numbers were falling quickly. They made several successful attempts to prevent themselves from being flanked, but after an hour and a half of heavy fighting, their numbers were significantly reduced. The remnants of the British force then tried to escape the battle. Rogers and some of his men did get away, but one group of men surrendered, only to be killed and scalped when a scalp was discovered in a pocket of one of the men.

== Aftermath ==
Rogers and his decimated company returned to Fort Edward on March 15. Rogers himself was originally reported by the French to have been killed, but had actually survived. The report stemmed from the manner of Rogers' escape during which he discarded some of his belongings, including his regimental coat, which contained his military commission. This episode also gave rise to a local legend that Rogers escaped the battle by sliding 400 feet down the side of a hill to the frozen surface of Lake George. While there is no proof of this event, the rockface he supposedly went down very quickly became known as Rogers' Slide.

Reports of casualties, and of the numbers of forces involved, starkly differed in this battle. Rogers' report of the event estimated the French-Indian force at 700, with one to two hundred casualties, and his accounts of the battle were doubted by a variety of commentators, as they were inconsistent with other accounts. A letter by Henry Pringle, written while held in captivity at Carillon, restored his reputation by clarifying the French advantage following the second ambush; Rogers went on to rebuild his companies and serve in the Battle of Carillon in July 1758.

== See also ==
- Battle of Carillon
