= William Haviland =

Irish-born British general

William Haviland (1718 – 16 September 1784) was an Irish-born general in the British Army. He is best known for his service in North America during the Seven Years' War.

== Life ==
William Haviland was born in Ireland in 1718. He entered military service as an ensign in the 43rd Foot in 1739, and first saw action during the War of Jenkins' Ear in a failed expedition against Cartagena (in present-day Colombia). He then served during the Jacobite Rising of 1745, and rose to the rank of lieutenant colonel by 1752.

In 1757 he was sent to North America, where he was first in Lord Loudoun's aborted expedition to Louisbourg. That winter, as a colonel he was placed in command of Fort Edward on the upper Hudson River, the forward outpost on the frontier between British New York and French Canada. He participated in James Abercrombie's disastrous attack on Fort Carillon in 1758, leading one of the attacking columns. In 1759 he served under Jeffery Amherst in his capture of Carillon, and was rewarded with promotion to brigadier general and command of the 1760 expedition from Ticonderoga to Montreal, upon which he joined Amherst and Murray there at the capitulation of Canada in September 1760.

He was then sent by Amherst, who had by then become Governor-General of British North America, to the West Indies, where he participated in the reduction of Martinique and Cuba in 1762, which garnered him a promotion to major general. In 1767 he was made colonel for life of the 45th Regiment of Foot.

He was promoted to lieutenant general in 1774, and served in the defence of Great Britain. He was promoted a full general in 1783, and died the following year. He was twice married, with a son and daughter by his second wife.

During the Seven Years' War Haviland invented a kind of slide rule "that permitted an officer to quickly determine the number of men to be detached from each company of a regiment, or from a regiment in a larger force, if a draft was made against it, consisting of two circular wheels, one within the other, made of ivory, about three inches across, with useful information on regimental organization etched into the back, which was possibly the first mechanical administrative aide ever invented for officers serving in the field."
