= Vaudreuil's raid =

Battle of Fort William Henry (March 1757)
- Part of the French and Indian War
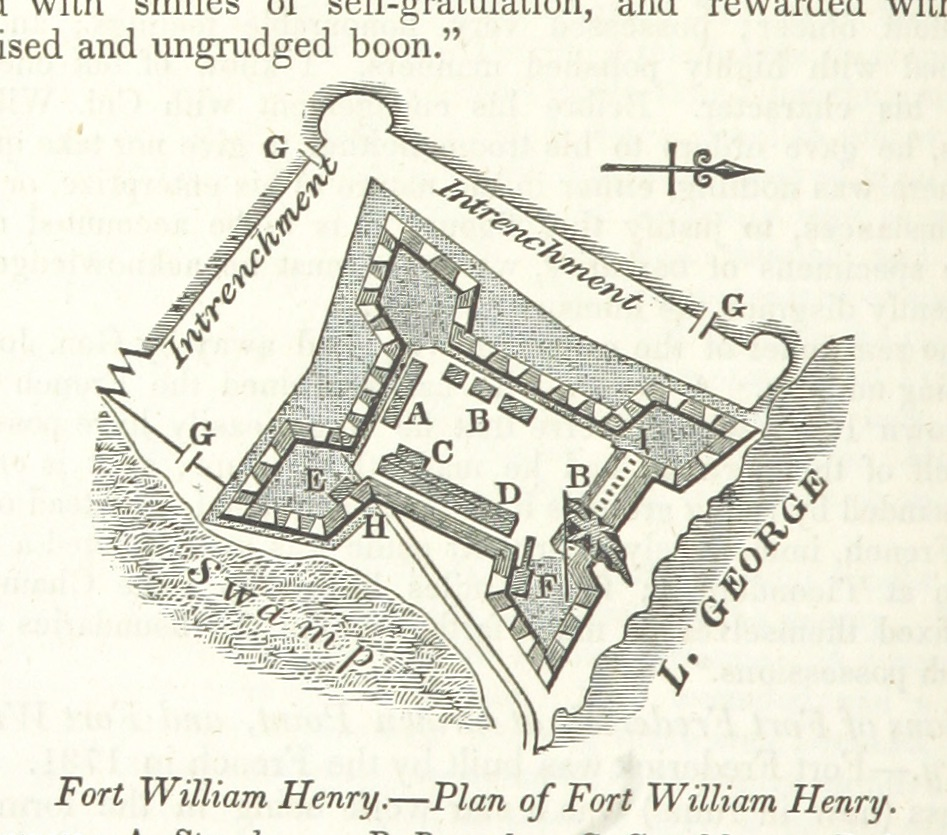
- Plan of Fort William Henry
Date	18–23 March 1757
Location	Fort William Henry, Lake George, Province of New York
Result	British victory

Belligerents
France	Great Britain

Commanders and leaders
Governor François-Pierre Rigaud de Vaudreuil	Major William Eyre; Captain Robert Rogers; Lieutenant-Colonel Munro (relief column)

Strength
1,600 (French regulars, Canadian militia, Native allies)	300–400 (garrison troops and colonial rangers)

Casualties and losses
Unknown	Unknown (destruction of supplies, bateaux, one sloop and several blockhouses)

Vaudreuil's raid, also known as the Battle of Fort William Henry, in March 1757 was a significant winter military operation during the French and Indian War, part of the broader conflict between Britain and France for control of North America. Under the command of Governor François-Pierre Rigaud de Vaudreuil, a French force of approximately 1,600 regulars, Canadian militia, and Native American allies marched across frozen terrain to strike at the British fort located at the southern end of Lake George, in the Province of New York. Although the British garrison, led by Major William Eyre, successfully defended the fort itself, the French forces succeeded in destroying nearly all of the supply depots, boats, and outbuildings important to the fort's logistics.

== Background ==
During the winter months Fort William Henry was lightly defended and the British-American army in the area had recently been depleted thanks to outbreaks of smallpox. The garrison of Fort William Henry, including rangers, consisted of 300-400 men (five companies of the 44th Foot and three companies of Rogers' Rangers). The garrison was commanded by William Eyre who had recently been promoted from Captain to Major thanks to his ingenuity during the Battle of Lake George in which he organised the artillery that helped repulse the French and Indian army. Captain Robert Rogers commanded several companies of Rangers who had been conducting scouting and raiding operations from the fort since January, into the territory dominated by the powerful French fort at Carillon.

=== French plan ===
During the winter of 1756–1757, the French sought to disrupt British frontier defenses and weaken their hold on the Lake George–Hudson River corridor. Recognising that British forces typically reduced their activities during harsh winter months, Governor Pierre de Rigaud, Marquis de Vaudreuil, and his brother François-Pierre Rigaud de Vaudreuil devised a plan to launch a surprise overland expedition against Fort William Henry. The objective was to overwhelm the fort or force its surrender, with a secondary objective to destroy its stock of boats and depots that sustained British operations on Lake George. The operation called for a swift march across the frozen surface of Lake Champlain and Lake George, using snowshoes and sledges to carry provisions, enabling the French and their Native allies to strike the fort with speed.

== Battle ==
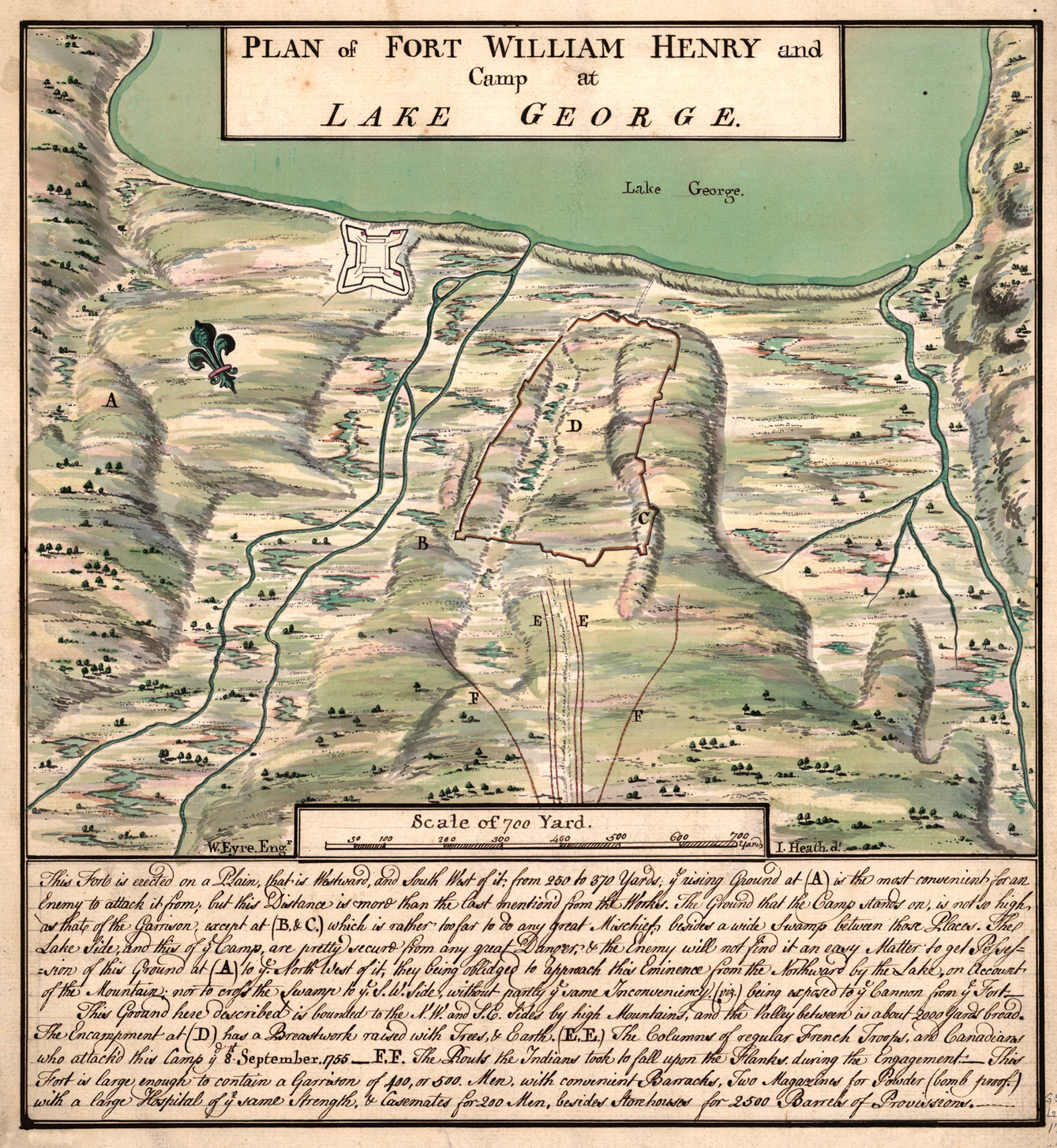
A hand-drawn plan of Fort William Henry at the southern end of Lake George, by William Eyre

On March 15 the force left Carillon with scaling ladders began to cross the frozen Lake George. An advanced party arrived near to the fort undetected on the night of March 17. Rigaud sent a reconnaissance party consisting of Iroquois and Troupes de la Marine towards the Fort to establish the state of the British defences. In the evening, Rigaud planned to advance in three columns and to climb the walls with ladders, if the reconnaissance party reported that the British could be taken by surprise. The French expected the British to be drunk or worse for wear following feasting for St Patrick that evening however the reconnaissance party found garrison alert and with sentries posted.

Rigaud's force had been detected by British scouts by March 18 eliminating any chance of a surprise assault.

Rigaud next attempted to demand of the fort's peaceful surrender but his request was met with cannon and musket fire, so he resorted to organise an ineffectual siege and carry out raids of the surrounding area.

When Rigaud realised that he had lost any chance of surprise, he immediately made an attempt to burn the largest British sloops and the British stock of bateaux but the poor weather and effective fire from the fort temporarily prevented this plan. Rigaud surrounded the fort and his force began an incessant musket fire which they kept up throughout the day and night of March 19.

Eyre realising that he had come under effective siege dispatched Rangers to run to Fort Edward to inform General Webb of the developments, Webb was in overall command of British forces around Lake George.

During the night of March 19 to 20, the French were heard again on the ice, approaching as if for an assault. The British fired grape shot towards the sound, driving the French back again. The French then tried to set fire to two sloops and a large number of bateaux on the shore but managed to burn only a few bateaux. Skirmishes occurred between the French raiders and British parties sallying from the fort throughout the night.

At noon on Sunday March 20, the French filed out of the woods and marched across the ice in procession, carrying their scaling-ladders. The French sent an envoy with another offer to Major Eyre to give up the place peaceably, promising favourable terms, and threatening a general assault and massacre in case of refusal. Eyre said that he and his men were obliged to defend themselves to the last; and the envoy was returned. Rigaud however used these negotiations as a diversion, the whole French force was now in place and advanced, as if to storm the works. The British garrison realising they had been deceived hurriedly prepared to receive them, however nothing significant came of the action, other than another ineffectual fusillade by the French.

During the night of March 20 to 21, the French were finally able to ignite several fires. The French claimed to have burnt more than 200 bateaux, blockhouses and one of the large sloops that night. The British could only answer with harassing fire from the fort and by the morning the surrounding area was engulfed in flame.

The French continued the siege and their attempts to burn the remaining British ships until March 23 when Rigaud finally broke camp and withdrew to Carillon before the ice on Lake George could thaw with the approaching Spring.

== Aftermath ==
Three days later British reinforcements under Lieutenant-Colonel George Munro who had marched overland, approached in sight of the burning fort. Munro had brought with him five companies of the 35th Foot and a battalion of the 60th Royal Americans. On March 27 Munro superseded Eyre as commander of the fort and began to rebuild the fort's defences.

Following the battle, Rigaud referred to Major Eyre as "an officer of consummate experience in the art of war."

== See also ==
- Siege of Fort William Henry
