= Battle of Sabbath Day Point =

1757 battle

Coordinates: 43°40′03″N 73°30′50″W

- Part of the French and Indian War
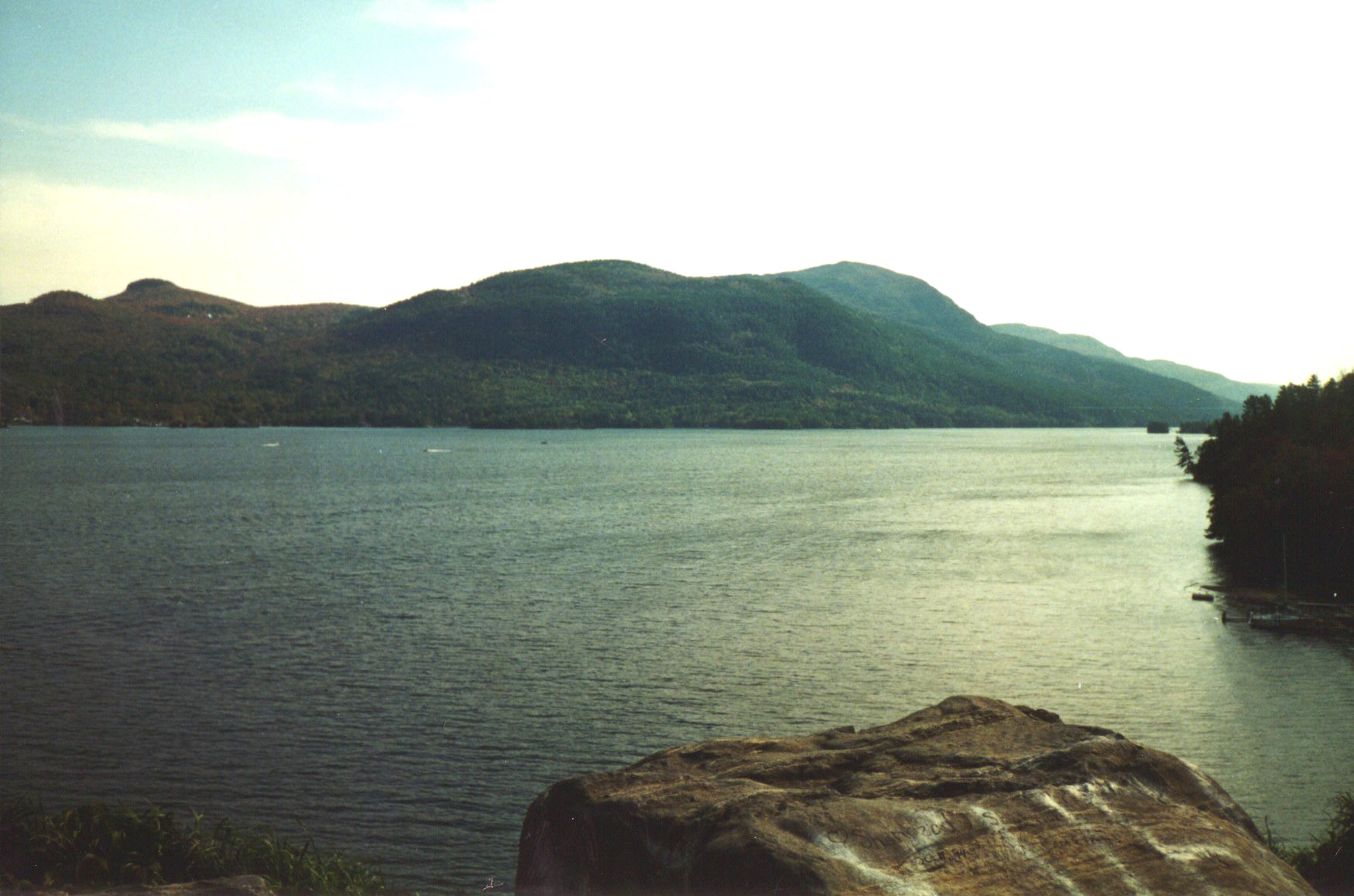
- View of Lake George from Sabbath Day Point
Date	23 July 1757
Location	Sabbath Day Point, New York
Result	French-Indian victory

Belligerents
France; Indian allies	New Jersey

Commanders and leaders
Charles Michel de Langlade; De Corbière	John Parker

Strength
Approximately 450	Approximately 350

Casualties and losses
1 wounded	160 killed or drowned 90 captured

The Battle of Sabbath Day Point took place on 23 July 1757 just off the shore of Sabbath Day Point, Lake George, New York and ended in a French victory. The battle (actually better described as an ambush), pitched approximately 450 French and allied Indian forces under the leadership of Ensign de Corbiere of the Troupes de la Marine against 350 New Jersey Blues under the command of Colonel John Parker. Ensign de Corbiere, aware of Parker's plan, ambushed and surrounded Parker's forces as they approached the shore in bateaux (shallow-draft, flat-bottomed boats). In the ensuing rout Parker lost approximately 250 men with nearly 160 men killed or drowned and the rest taken prisoner. The French reported only one man slightly wounded.

== Background ==
During March 1757 Fort William Henry came under siege for four days by French forces. Lacking sufficient logistical and artillery support, and hampered further by a blinding snowstorm on 21 March, French forces were unable to take the fort and the siege was called off. Although the French failed to take the fort itself, their forces did destroy three hundred bateaux and several lightly armed vessels beached on the shore, a saw-mill and numerous outbuildings.

Following the withdrawal, British forces under Lieutenant-Colonel George Monro claimed a victory. The French may have not been able to take the fort, but the destruction of so many boats crippled Monro's ability to sortie reconnaissance parties further up the lake to assess French and Indian movements. Coupled with the loss of the boats, manpower shortages and "ignorant and undisciplined" soldiers all made patrolling and scouting outside the protective walls of Fort William Henry quite precarious for Monro and he was unable to send out sufficient scouts.

Throughout the spring and early summer the Indians, spurred on by French rewards of brandy, guns, ammunition and clothing, sortied on raiding parties from Fort Carillon south towards Fort William Henry, kidnapping and scalping anyone who dared venture beyond the protective walls of the fort. Although starved for information, Monro could do little to respond to the Indian raids or gain intelligence on French movements until sufficient reinforcements arrived. He also moved slowly to re-construct the buildings or boats destroyed by the French months earlier. In June reinforcements finally did arrive when Provincial and militia units from New York, New Jersey and New Hampshire were sent up from Fort Edward by General Daniel Webb. Desperate for information and now newly reinforced, Monro decided to act.

== Battle ==
Monro, an officer with virtually no battle experience, decided to risk a reconnaissance in force. His plan was to gather all available boats, pack them with approximately 350 men and send them north up the lake into an area controlled by an enemy he knew little about. To command this force Monro chose Colonel John Parker of the newly arrived Jersey Blues unit. It was decided to land Colonel Parker's flotilla of men on Sabbath Day Point situated approximately 20 miles (32 km) north of Fort William Henry on the west side of Lake George. On 20 July an advance party of three boats left for the point, with Parker's main force departing in the pre-dawn hours of 21 July. The passage of the first three boats was spotted by French scouts. On 21 July a force of approximately 450 French and Indian men under the command of Ensign de Corbiere departed Fort Carillon to intercept. The French ambushed Parker's three lead boats and while under "questioning" by Indians, the Provincials told them exactly where Parker planned to come ashore. The French trap was then set. The ambush plan was to place musket-men along the shore of the point and a flotilla of Indians in fifty canoes out of view on the opposite side of the point.

In the early morning hours of 23 July Parker's main force approached Sabbath Day Point unaware that the French had intercepted his three lead boats and learned his plan. As Parker's men approached the shore they noticed the three boats sent out a day ahead and assumed nothing was wrong. Three decoys aided the French and Indians in springing the trap by beckoning Parker's men towards the shore. Once within range Parker's men came under a withering volley of musket fire from the soldiers and Indians hidden along the shore. At the same time the Indians in the canoes broke around the point and surrounded Parker's men. The Indians jumped into the water from their canoes and sank, capsized or captured all but two of Parker's boats. Once in the water, many of the Provincials were speared or drowned. The ensuing battle was severely one-sided as the terrified and overwhelmed soldiers surrendered almost without firing a shot. Barely 100 of Parker's men, including Parker himself, escaped the onslaught of the French and Indians. Of Parker's force of 350, nearly 160 drowned or were killed. The remainder were taken prisoner.

== Aftermath ==
Colonel Parker, lucky to escape the onslaught, led what was left of his men through the brush and thick forest back to Fort William Henry. The victors loaded their prisoners and spoils into boats and headed north. Along the way they sang songs and indulged in the rum taken from the Provincials. Once back at Fort Carillon the Indians, drunk on rum, boiled and ate one unlucky captive.

Monro paid a heavy price to learn that there was a sizeable body of French and Indians further up the lake. The French capitalized on the win and sent two forces south from Carillon, one on Lake George and one chopping through the dense forest on the west side of the lake. With the defeat on Sabbath Day Point, both bodies met little British resistance. Their objective was Fort William Henry; on the morning of 3 August the French came down the lake and glided into the view of the British. The Battle of Fort William Henry was about to begin.

== Bibliography ==
- Fowler, William M (2005). Empires at war: The French and Indian War and the Struggle for North America 1754–1763. New York: Walker & Company. ISBN 0-8027-1411-0.
