= William Eyre (British Army officer, died 1765) =

7 Years' War British Army officer (1735–1765)

- Born: c. 1735
- Died: November 1765 (aged c. 30); Atlantic Ocean
- Spouse: Mary Henzell
- Military career
- Allegiance: Great Britain
- Branch: British Army
- Service years: 1755–1759
- Rank: Lieutenant-Colonel
- Units: Royal Engineers; 44th Foot
- Conflicts: 7 Years War; Battle of Lake George; Vaudreuil's Raid; Battle of Carillon
- Awards: Voted the thanks of the General Court of Rhode Island 1756

William Eyre (c. 1735 - November 1765) was a British Army officer who served with some distinction during the Seven Years' War. Eyre was an engineer by trade who commanded infantry and irregulars successfully in North America. Eyre won a notable victory whilst defending Fort William Henry from a Franco-Native assault in March 1757, several months before the siege of Fort William Henry made famous in the novel the Last of the Mohicans. Eyre was instrumental in the design and construction of Anglo-American fortifications in the New York-Niagara frontier.

In 1761, having "grown tired of the war in this country" after nearly a decade of service in America and disillusioned with British-Native policy, Eyre requested leave to return to England. In perhaps a testament to his importance to the army in North America, Eyre's leave was not granted until 1764; however, he drowned off the coast of Britain whilst returning home in 1765.

== Early life ==
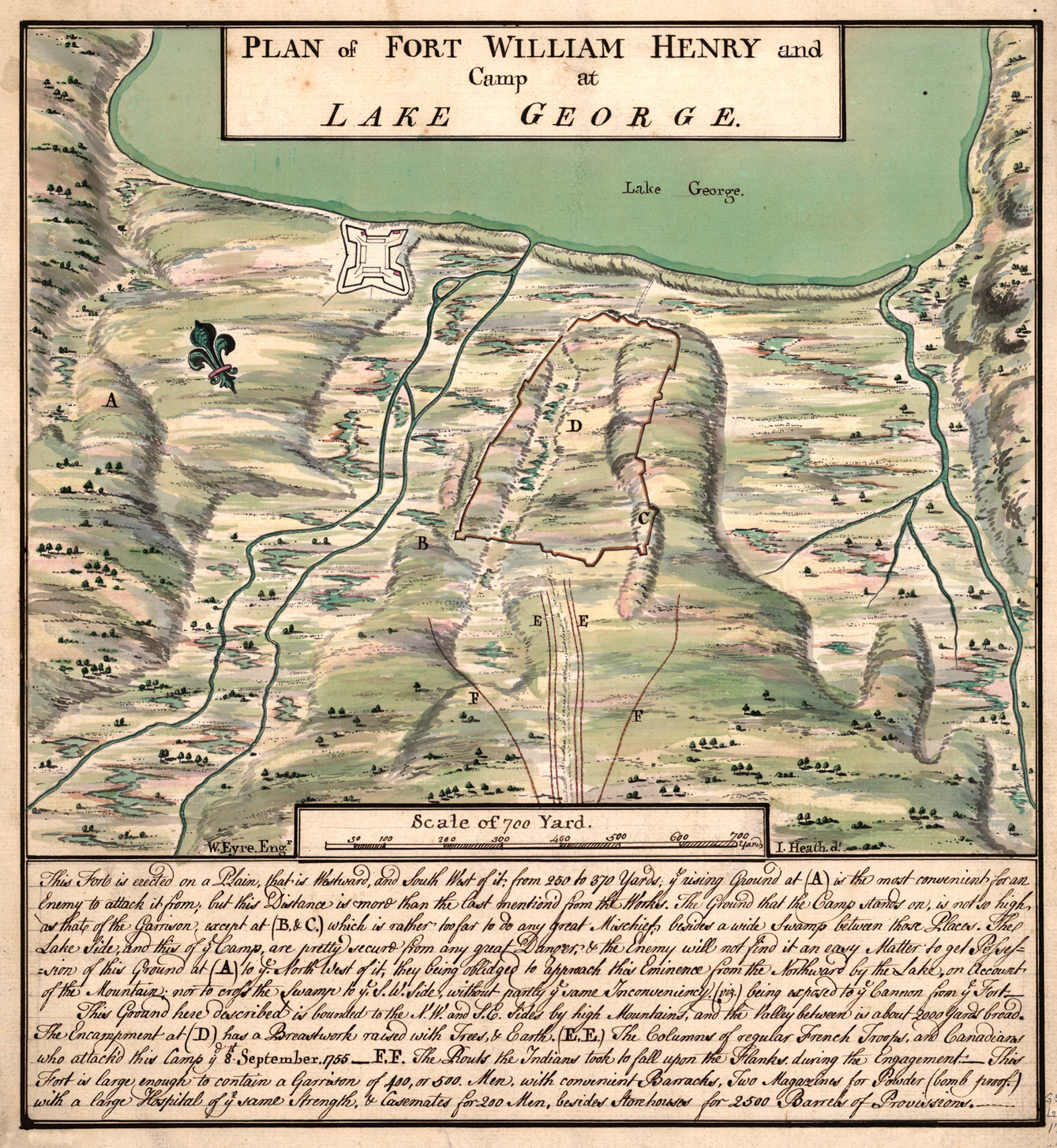
Plan of Fort William Henry, made by William Eyre

Eyre served in the Royal Engineers during the Jacobite rising of 1745 and the War of the Austrian Succession.

== North America ==
Eyre came to North America in 1755 as a captain in 44th Foot. He was sent by Edward Braddock to attend William Johnson as military Engineer upon his expedition to erect Forts on the Hudson, at the foot of Lake George, and at Crown-Point. He was also made quartermaster general and director of artillery for the campaign, making three roles he filled as the only British regular officer in the otherwise American colonial militia and Mohawk army of General Johnson. Eyre's planned Fort Lyman – later renamed Fort Edward – under orders from General Phineas Lyman.

During the Battle of Lake George he commanded the artillery that defeated repeated French attacks. After the battle he planned and led the construction of Fort William Henry, becoming its first commandant. A French attempt led by François-Pierre Vaudreuil to capture the fort was repelled by Eyre and the garrison in March 1757. Following this he left the command to George Monro when the 35th Foot relieved the 44th. During the Battle of Carillon he was wounded leading his 888-men strong regiment during the failed attacks to take the French fort. He was later in charge of the rebuilding of Fort Ticonderoga. Having been promoted to Major in the 44th in 1756, he became an Engineer in Ordinary in 1758 and Chief Engineer of the Army and Lieutenant-Colonel in his regiment in 1759.

== Death ==
Eyre drowned off the English coast in November 1765 on his way home.
