= Languedoc Regiment =

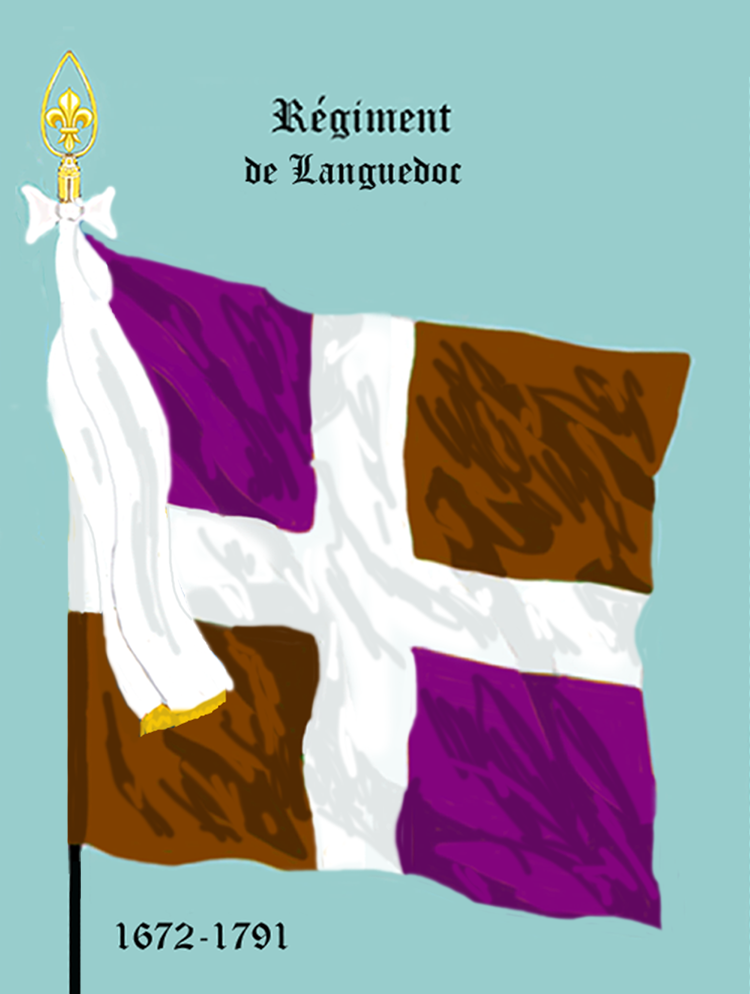
Languedoc Regiment

The Languedoc Regiment (French: Régiment de Languedoc, pronounced [ʁeʒimɑ̃ də lɑ̃ɡdɔk]) was a French Army regiment active in the 18th century. It is known mainly for its role in the Seven Years' War, when it served in the French and Indian War.

== History ==
The regiment arrived in Quebec City on June 19, 1755. The soldiers left immediately for Fort Saint Frédéric and, on orders of Jean Erdman, Baron Dieskau, pushed the British troops back to Lake George. After the Battle of Lake George, the regiment was sent to Fort Carillon, then under construction. The regiment was then sent towards the south and participated in the successful Siege of Fort William Henry.

On July 8, 1758, the second battalion participated at the Battle of Carillon. In May 1759, it went to Quebec City, where it participated in defending the city. It then took part at the Battles of Montmorency, Plains of Abraham, and Sainte-Foy.

== Legacy ==
The hamlet of Languedoc in Rivière-Ojima, Quebec, Canada, was named after the regiment.

== See also ==
- Languedoc
- New France
- Military of New France
- French ship ''Languedoc'' (1766)
