= Phineas Lyman =

American military officer and politician

Major-General Phineas Lyman (1716 – October 10, 1774) was an American military officer and politician who served in French and Indian War. He later led a group of New England veterans of the war to settle in the new colony of West Florida where he died shortly before the outbreak of the American Revolutionary War. He earned a reputation as the most experienced colonial American officer during the war.

== Early life ==
Lyman was born at Durham, Connecticut. He graduated at Yale in 1738, was a tutor there until 1741, studied law and began practice at Suffield (which was then within the boundaries of Massachusetts). In 1749 he advocated the annexation of Suffield from Massachusetts. From 1749 to 1755 he was a member of the upper chamber of the Connecticut Legislature (then known as the Council.

== French and Indian War ==
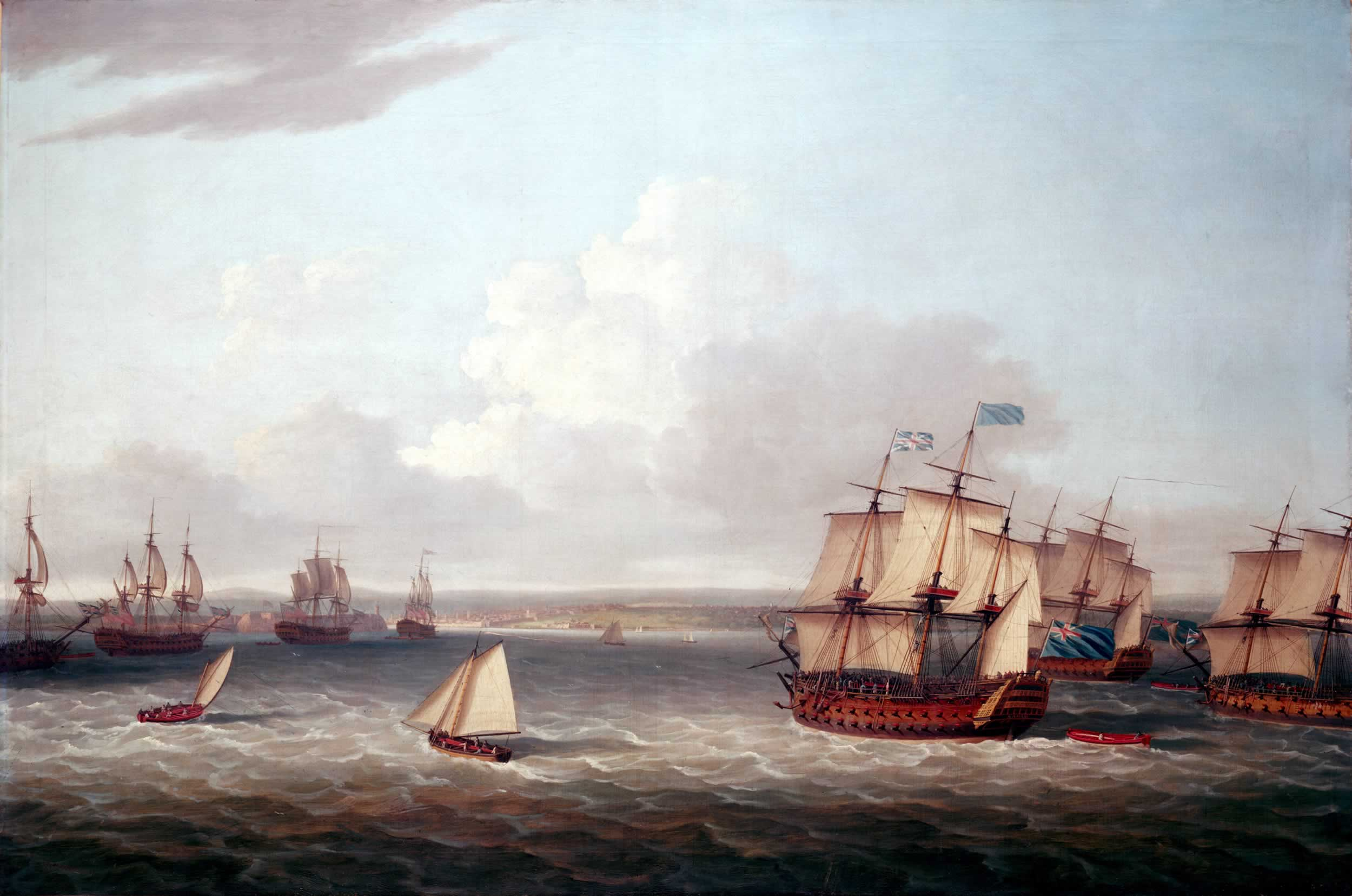
The British expedition against Cuba, in which Lyman commanded the colonial contingent

During the French and Indian War, Lyman was promoted to major general in the Connecticut Militia and appointed as the commander of a 1,000-strong militia force in March 1755. In August, he led his troops to join an ultimately unsuccessful British expedition led by Major-general Sir William Johnson against French-held Fort Saint-Frédéric. On September 8 Johnson's troops defeated a French army at the Battle of Lake George; during the battle, after Johnson was wounded Lyman took command of Johnson's army and repulsed an attack by French troops and French-allied Indian warriors.

In 1757 Lyman served as the commander of Fort Edward and in the next year commanded the Connecticut contingent in another British expedition led by Major-general James Abercrombie which ended after it was defeated at the Battle of Carillon on 8 July. Lyman served under Major-general Lord Amherst when the latter led a force which captured the abandoned ruins of Fort Saint-Frédéric in August 1759 and in 1760 took part in the successful Montreal campaign. In 1762, Lyman commanded the colonial contingent of Lieutenant-general Lord Albemarle's army in the successful British expedition against Cuba.

== Later life ==
In 1763, he went to England where he remained until 1772, endeavoring to obtain a grant of land for himself and other New England veterans in the newly created colony of West Florida. A tract near Natchez (now Mississippi) was granted by royal charter in 1772. Lyman led a band of settlers to the region in 1773. He died the following year on October 10, 1774 and was buried near to the Big Black River in West Florida. When the American War broke out in 1775, West Florida was one of the colonies which remained loyal to the crown. In the post-war Peace of Paris it was transferred to Spanish control.

== See also ==
- Waterman Crane – Early Mississippi colonist (1761–1826)
