= George Monro (British Army officer) =

British Army officer

- Born: 1700; Clonfin, County Longford
- Died: 3 November 1757 (aged 56–57); Albany, New York
- Relatives: George Munro, 1st of Auchinbowie (father)
- Military career
- Allegiance: Great Britain
- Branch: British Army
- Service years: 1718–1757
- Rank: Lieutenant colonel
- Conflicts: French and Indian War; Siege of Fort William Henry

Lieutenant-Colonel George Monro (1700 – 3 November 1757) was a British Army officer best known for his unsuccessful defense of Fort William Henry in 1757 during the French and Indian War. After surrendering with full honours of war to French General Louis-Joseph de Montcalm, he and his troops were attacked by French-allied Native Americans. The events of the siege were made famous by James Fenimore Cooper in his novel The Last of the Mohicans.

== Early life and career ==
Monro was born in Clonfin, County Longford, Ireland, in about 1700. He was the younger son of George Munro, 1st of Auchinbowie, who was famed for his victory at the Battle of Dunkeld in 1689 in Scotland. However, when John Alexander Inglis wrote his history of the Monro of Auchinbowie family in 1911, he had not then identified the younger George Monro as a member of the family.

Monro joined Otway's Regiment, the 35th Regiment of Foot, as a Lieutenant in 1718. He appears to have had an unremarkable military career by rising in the ranks to lieutenant-colonel by 1750.

== Seven Years' War ==
Hostilities between Britain and France were soon renewed with the outbreak of the Seven Years' War in 1756. The 35th Regiment was deployed to America, where Monro relieved Lieutenant-Colonel William Eyre as commander of Fort William Henry in the Province of New York. That summer, the French General Louis-Joseph de Montcalm led a force of 7,626 French and Native troops in a weeklong Siege of Fort William Henry. Effectively cut off from the main British force, commanded by General Daniel Webb, the 2,327-man British garrison stood little chance of holding the fort once the French began formal siege operations on 3 August. Monro was forced to open negotiations with Montcalm on 9 August.

Monro's tenacious defence of the fort won him generous terms of surrender from Montcalm. The British were accorded the full honours of war by being allowed to keep their colours, muskets and a single symbolic cannon. The garrison would be paroled and allowed to march to the British-held Fort Edward, about 17 miles (27 km) away.

However, it was not to be. As Monro led his garrison from Fort William Henry the next day, the Native American warriors attacked the British soldiers and killed approximately 185 of them. Monro actually survived the massacre, but he died suddenly in Albany just three months later, on 3 November 1757.

== In popular culture ==
Colonel Munro is portrayed in James Fenimore Cooper's story The Last of the Mohicans, in which he is the father of two daughters, Alice and Cora, from two successive wives. In reality Munro never married, and had three "reputed" children (two sons and a daughter). In the story, he plays a similar role as he did in history, leading the defense of Fort William Henry.

In the blockbuster 1992 film adaptation, he is portrayed (by Scottish actor Maurice Roëves) as being killed in the massacre by Montcalm's Native allies, the leader of whom, Magua, cuts his heart out as revenge for Monro killing his family. He is also portrayed in the 1920 silent film by James Gordon, in the 1932 version by Edward Hearn, in the 1936 version by Hugh Buckler, in the 1965 version by Paul Muller and in the 1968 version by Otto Ambros.

Monro is also portrayed as a supporting character in the 2014 action-adventure video game Assassin's Creed Rogue. He is shown to be a noble character, seeking to help the people of New York City recover from the gang violence and the disrepair of the city. He is a member of the Templar Order and assists Christopher Gist and the protagonist Shay Patrick Cormac until he is killed by Assassin Liam O'Brien in Albany after the fall of Fort William Henry. He is voiced by Graham J. Cuthbertson.
