= Siege of Fort William Henry =

Siege during the Seven Years' War

- Part of the French and Indian War
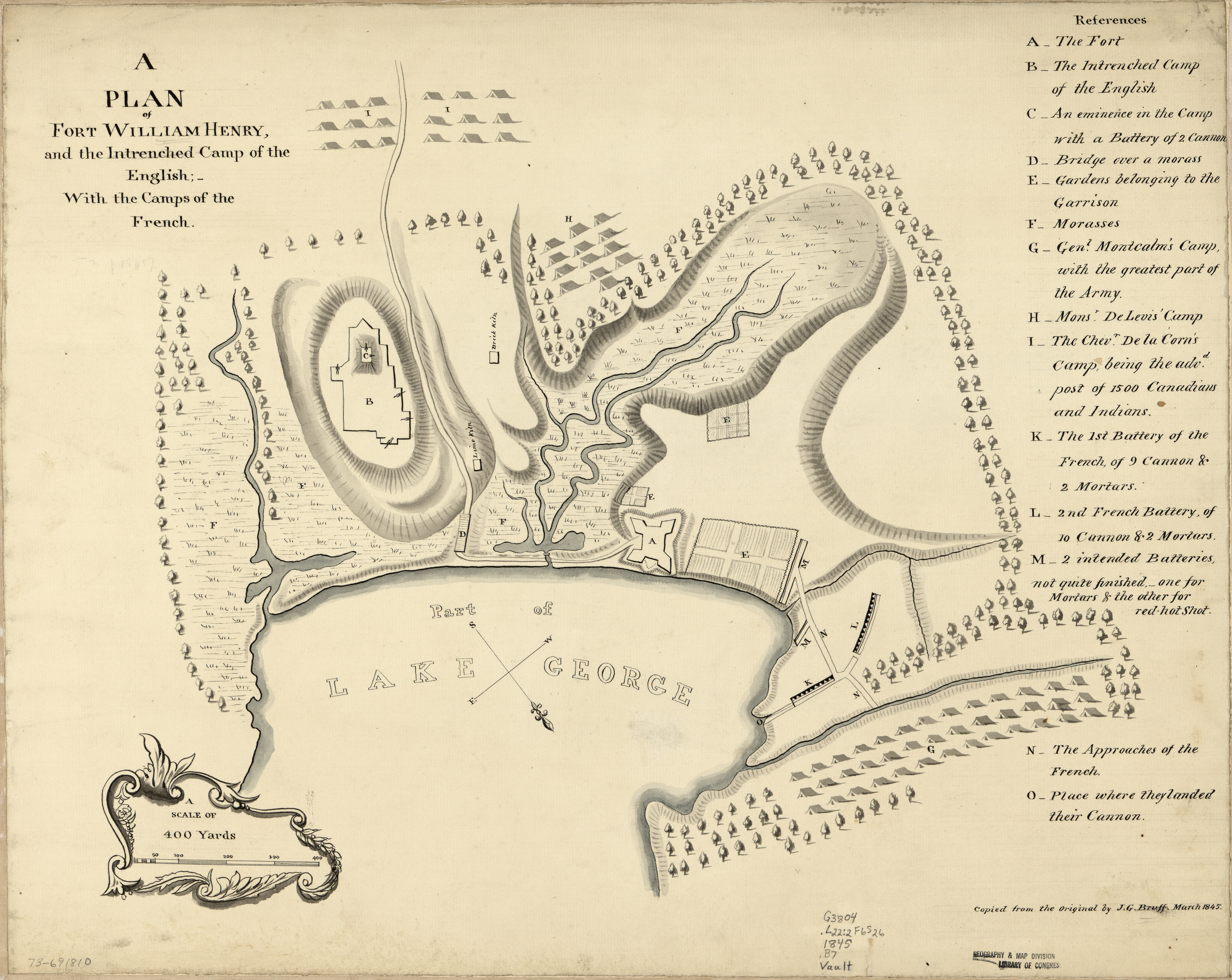
- Plan of the siege of Fort William Henry, showing the intrenched camp of the English and the camps of the French.
Date	3–9 August 1757
Location	Fort William Henry, New York 43°25′13″N 73°42′40″W
Result	French-Indian victory

Belligerents
France; New France; Odawa; Abenaki; Potawatomi; Nipissing	Great Britain (Kingdom of Great Britain) British America

Commanders and leaders
(Kingdom of France) Montcalm (New France) Charles de Langlade (New France) François-Charles de Bourlamaque	(Kingdom of Great Britain) George Monro (surrendered)

Strength
6,200 regulars and militia 1,800 Native Americans	2,500 regulars and provincials

Casualties and losses
Light	130–185 killed or wounded 2,308 captured
- 69–184 British prisoners killed in captivity or missing

The siege of Fort William Henry (3–9 August 1757, French: Bataille de Fort William Henry) was conducted by a French and Indian force led by Louis-Joseph de Montcalm against the British-held Fort William Henry. This fort, located at the southern end of Lake George, on the frontier between the British Province of New York and the French Province of Canada, was garrisoned by a poorly supported force of British regulars and provincial militia led by Lieutenant Colonel George Monro.

After several days of bombardment and increasing casualty rates, Monro surrendered to Montcalm, whose force included nearly 2,000 Indians from various tribes. The terms of surrender included the withdrawal of the garrison to Fort Edward, with specific terms that the French military protect the British from the Indians as they withdrew from the area.

In one of the most notorious incidents of the French and Indian War, Montcalm's Indian allies violated the agreed terms of surrender and attacked the departing British column, which had been deprived of ammunition, as it left the fort. They killed and scalped numerous soldiers and civilians, took as captives women, children, servants, and slaves, and slaughtered sick and wounded prisoners. Early accounts of the events called it a massacre and implied that as many as 1,500 people were killed, although it is unlikely more than 200 people (less than 10% of the British fighting strength) were actually killed in the massacre.

Whether or not Montcalm and the other French officers present encouraged or opposed the actions of their Indian allies, and the total number of victims, remain matters of historical debate. The memory of the killings influenced the actions of British military commanders, especially those of General Jeffery Amherst, for the remainder of the war.

== Background ==
The French and Indian War, an extension of The Seven Years' War, started in 1754 over territorial disputes between the North American colonies of France and Great Britain in areas that are now western Pennsylvania and northern New York. The war was sparked when Lieutenant Colonel George Washington and a small contingent of Mingo allies ambushed a force of French Canadians resulting in the capturing and massacring of said force. This conflict is known as the Battle of Jumonville Glen and broke the struggling peace between France and Britain's colonies.

The first few years of the war did not go particularly well for the British. A major expedition by General Edward Braddock in 1755 ended in disaster, and British military leaders were unable to mount any campaigns the following year. In a major setback, a French and Indian army, led by General Louis-Joseph de Montcalm, captured the garrison and destroyed fortifications at the Battle of Fort Oswego in August 1756. In July 1756, the Earl of Loudoun arrived to take command of the British forces in North America and replaced William Shirley, who had temporarily assumed command after Braddock's death.

=== British planning ===
Loudoun's plan for the 1757 campaign was submitted to the government in London in September 1756. It was focused on a single expedition aimed at the heart of New France, Quebec City. It called for a purely-defensive postures along the frontier with New France, including the contested corridor of the Hudson River and Lake Champlain between Albany and Montreal.

After the Battle of Lake George in 1755, the French had begun construction of Fort Carillon, now known as Fort Ticonderoga, near the southern end of Lake Champlain, and the British had built Fort William Henry, at the southern end of Lake George, and Fort Edward on the Hudson River, about 16 miles (26 km) south of Fort William Henry (all three forts are now in New York State). The purpose behind the construction of the fort was to gain control of Lake George (French: Lac Du Saint Sacrement). This was done in order to rival French claims to the surrounding area. This area between Forts William Henry and Carillon was a wilderness dominated by Lake George. The historian Ian Steele described it as "a military waterway that left opposing cannons only a few days apart."

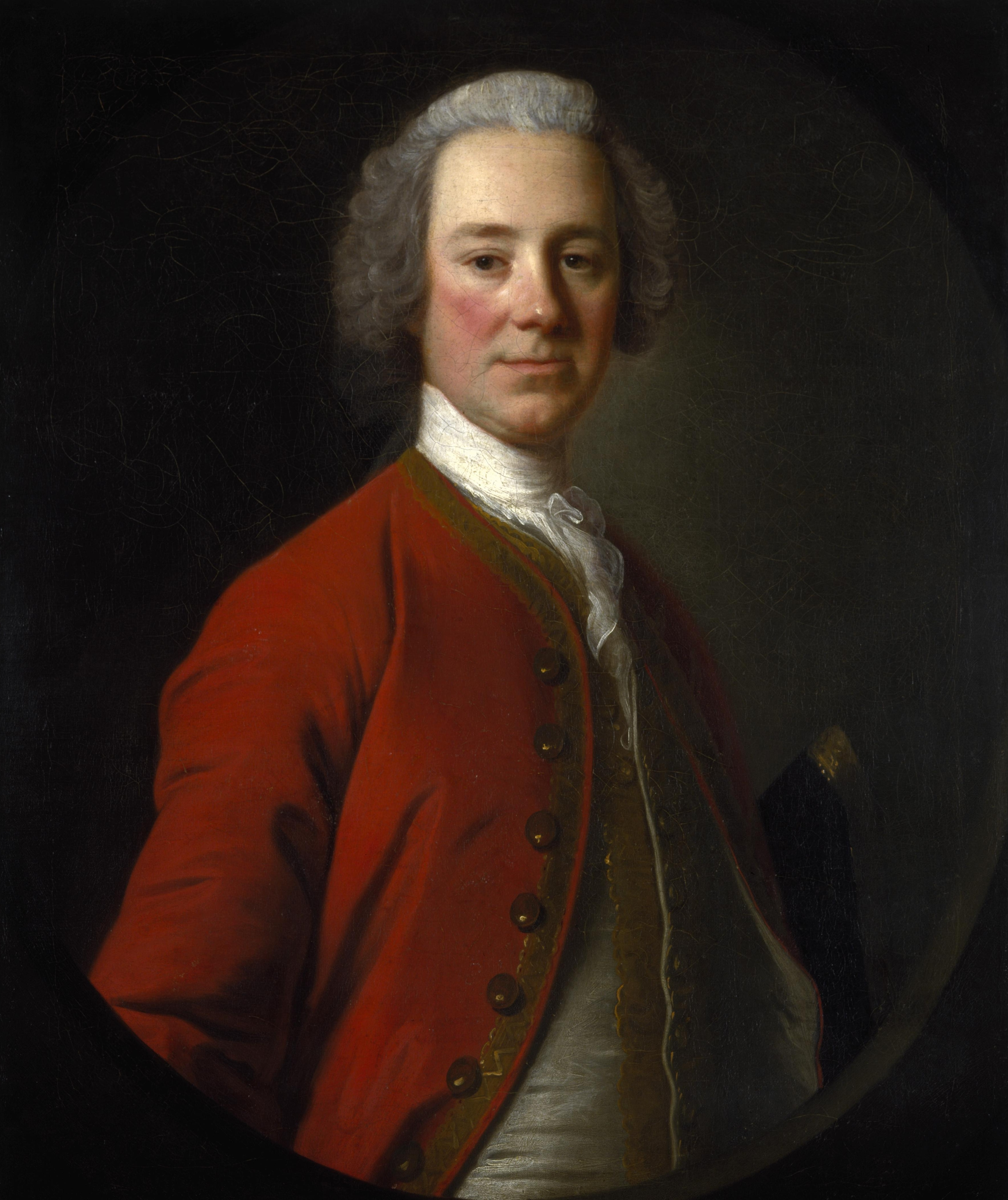
Lord Loudoun, portrait by Allan Ramsay

Loudoun's plan depended on the expedition's timely arrival at Quebec so that French troops would not have the opportunity to move against targets on the frontier, and would instead be needed to defend the heartland of Canada along the Saint Lawrence River. However, political turmoil in London over the progress of the Seven Years' War in North America and in Europe resulted in a change of power, with William Pitt the Elder rising to take control over military matters. Loudoun consequently did not receive any feedback from London on his proposed campaign until March 1757.

Before that feedback arrived, he developed plans for the expedition to Quebec and worked with the provincial governors of the Thirteen Colonies to develop plans for a coordinated defence of the frontier, including the allotment of militia quotas to each province.

When Pitt's instructions finally reached Loudoun in March 1757, they called for the expedition to target Louisbourg on the Atlantic coast of Île Royale, which is now known as Cape Breton Island. Although that did not materially affect the planning of the expedition, it would have significant consequences on the frontier. The French forces on the Saint Lawrence would be too far from Louisbourg to support it and would consequently be free to act elsewhere. Loudoun assigned his best troops to the Louisbourg expedition and placed Brigadier General Daniel Webb in command of the New York frontier. He was given about 2,000 regulars, primarily from the 35th and 60th (Royal American) Regiments. The provinces were to supply Webb with about 5,000 militia.

=== French planning ===
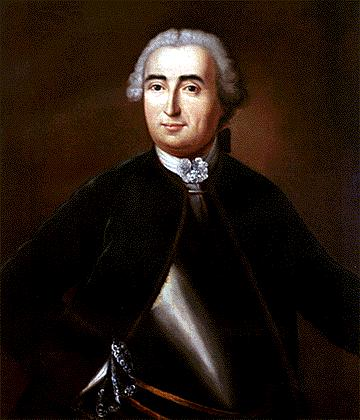
Portrait of Montcalm, copy by Théophile Hamel from unknown original

After the success of his 1756 assault on Fort Oswego, Montcalm had been seeking an opportunity to deal with the British position at Fort William Henry to provide the British with a launching point for attacks against Fort Carillon. He was initially hesitant to commit his limited resources against Fort William Henry without knowing more about the disposition of British forces. Intelligence provided by spies in London arrived in the spring and indicated that the British target was probably Louisbourg. That suggested that troop levels on the British side of the frontier might be low enough to make an attack on Fort William Henry feasible. The idea was further supported by the French questioning deserters and captives who had been taken during periodic scouting and raiding expeditions, which both sides conducted, including one resulting in the January Battle on Snowshoes.

As early as December 1756, New France's governor, the Marquis de Vaudreuil, began the process of recruiting Indians for the following summer's campaign. Fueled by stories circulated by Indian participants in the capture of Oswego, the drive was highly successful by drawing nearly 1,000 warriors from the Pays d'en Haut, the more remote regions of New France, to Montreal by June 1757. Another 800 Indians were recruited from tribes that lived closer to the Saint Lawrence.

=== British preparations ===
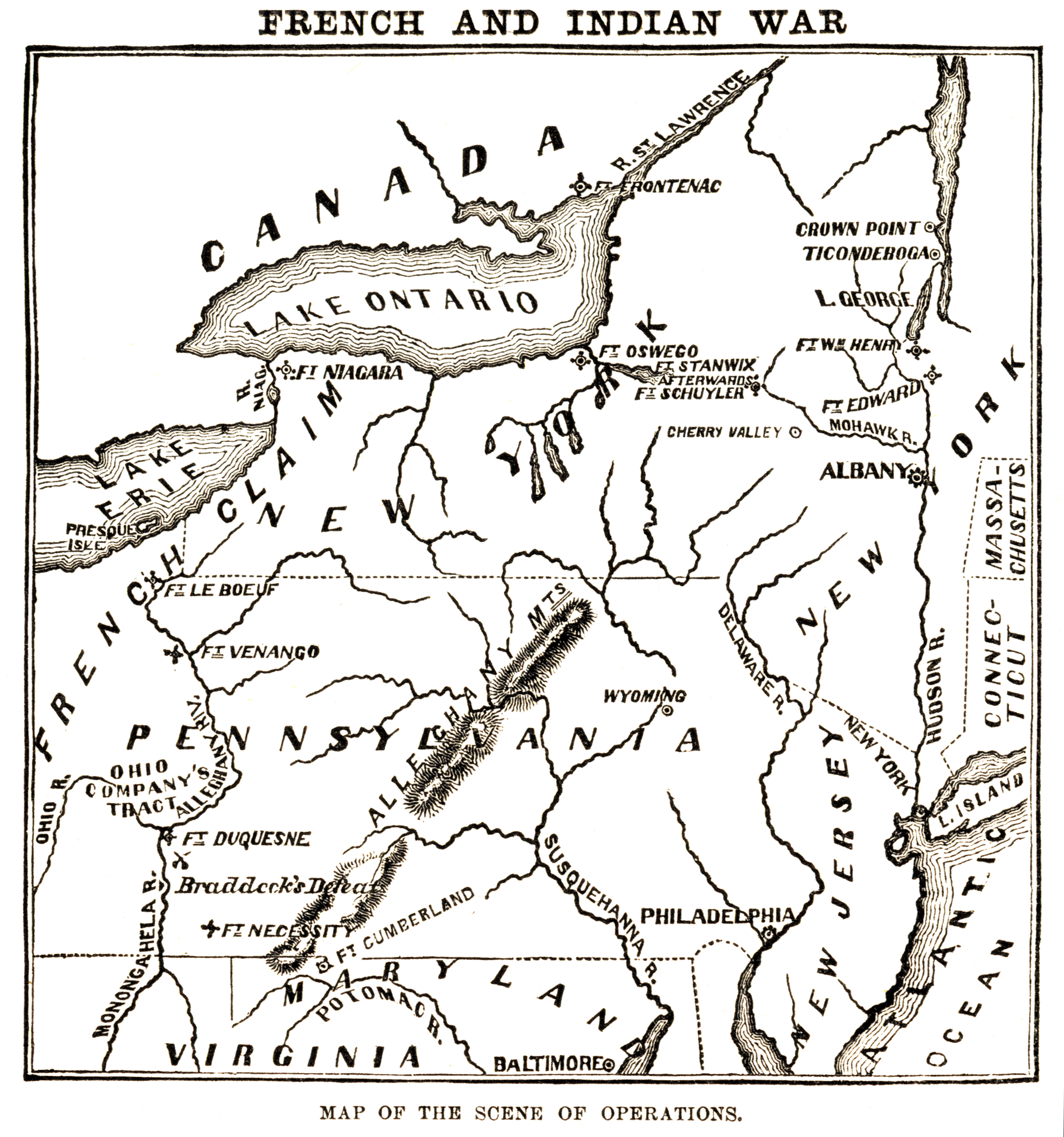
A map showing the theater of war in New York and Pennsylvania. Fort William Henry is just above "York" on the right side of the map.

Fort William Henry, built in the fall of 1755, was a roughly square fortification with bastions on the corners in a design that was intended to repel Indian attacks, but it was not necessarily sufficient to withstand attack from an enemy that had artillery. Its walls were 30 feet (9.1 m) thick, with log facings surrounding an earthen filling. Inside the fort were wooden barracks two stories high that were built around the parade ground. Its magazine was in the northeastern bastion, and its hospital was located in the southeastern bastion. The fort was surrounded on three sides by a dry moat, with the fourth side sloping down to the lake. The only access to the fort was by a bridge across the moat. The fort was capable of housing only four to five hundred men; additional troops were quartered in an entrenched camp 750 yards (690 m) southeast of the fort, near the site of the 1755 Battle of Lake George.

During the winter of 1756–1757, Fort William Henry was garrisoned by several hundred men from the 44th Foot under Major Will Eyre. In March 1757, the French sent an army of 1,500 to attack the fort under the command of the governor's brother, Pierre de Rigaud. Composed primarily of colonial troupes de la marine, militia, and Indians and without heavy weapons, they besieged the fort for four days, destroyed outbuildings and many watercraft, and retreated.

Eyre and his men were replaced by Lieutenant Colonel George Monro and the 35th Foot and the 60th (Royal American) Foot. In the spring. Monro established his headquarters in the entrenched camp to the southwest of the fort, where most of his men were located because the fort was too small to quarter this many troops. By June the garrison had increased to about 1,600 men with the arrival of provincial militia companies from Connecticut and New Jersey.

Webb, who commanded the area from his base at Fort Edward, received intelligence in April that the French were accumulating resources and troops at Carillon. News of continued French activity arrived with a captive taken in mid-July. After an attack by Joseph Marin de la Malgue on a work crew near Fort Edward on 23 July, Webb travelled to Fort William Henry with a party of Connecticut rangers led by Major Israel Putnam and sent a detachment of them onto the lake for reconnaissance. They returned with word that Indians were encamped on islands in the lake about 18 miles (29 km) from the fort. Swearing Putnam and his rangers to secrecy, Webb returned to Fort Edward, and on 2 August, he sent Lieutenant Colonel John Young with 200 regulars and 800 Massachusetts militia to reinforce the garrison at William Henry. That raised the size of the garrison to about 2,500, but several hundred of them were ill, some with smallpox.

=== French preparations ===
The Indians that assembled at Montreal were sent south to Fort Carillon, where they joined the French regiments of Béarn and Royal Roussillon under François-Charles de Bourlamaque and those of La Sarre, Guyenne, Languedoc, and la Reine under François de Gaston, Chevalier de Lévis. Combined with the troupes de la marine, militia companies, and the arriving Indians, the force accumulated at Fort Carillon amounted to 8,000 men. The French forces included 3,000 regulars, 3,000 militia and nearly 2,000 Indians from various tribes.

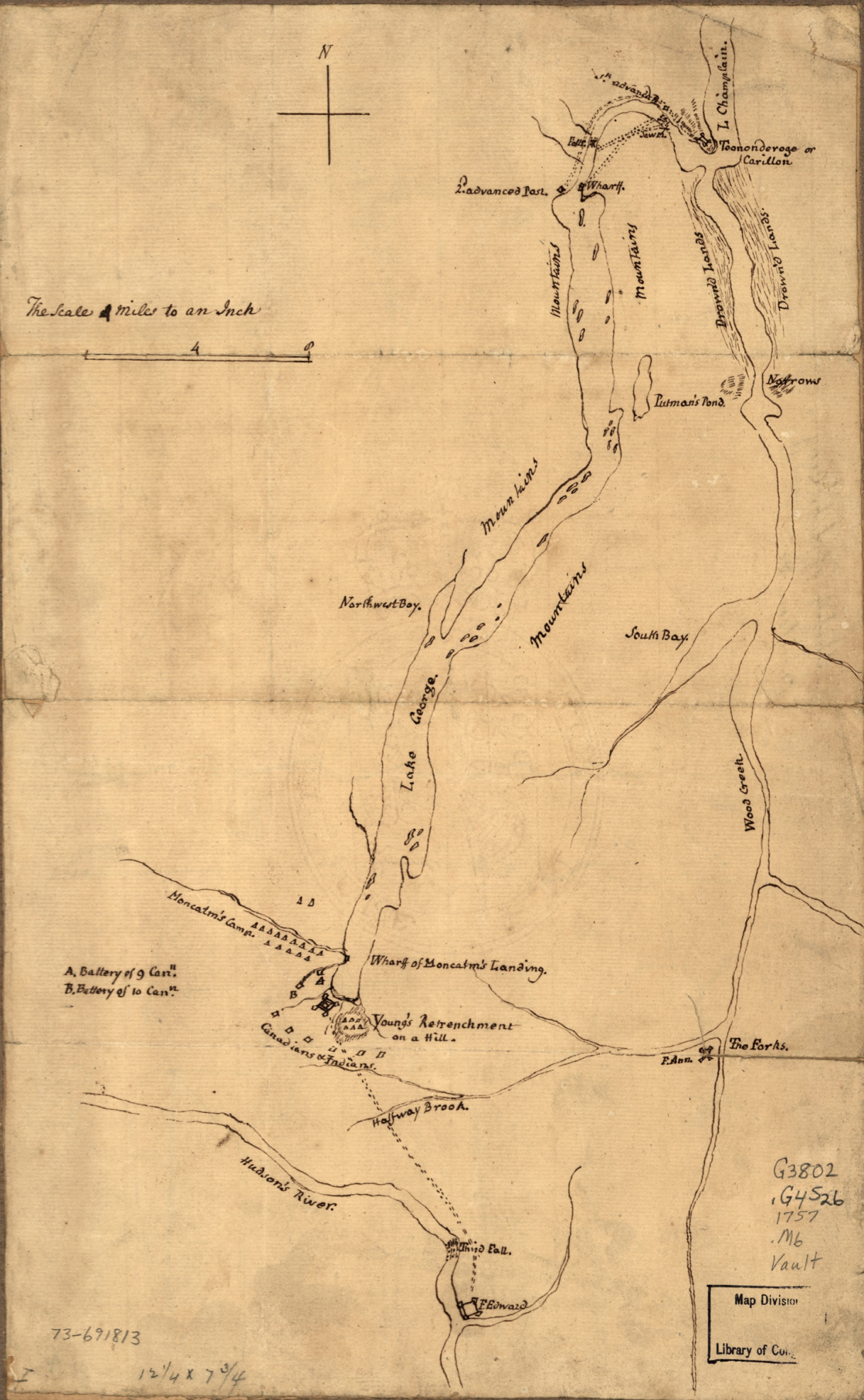
A hand-drawn map depicting the siege area, by James Gabriel Montresor

At Fort Carillon, the French leadership had difficulty controlling the behavior of the Indian allies. Although the French stopped one group from forcing a British prisoner to run the gauntlet, a group of Ottawa was not stopped when it was observed to be ritually cannibalizing another prisoner. The French authorities were also frustrated in their ability to limit the Indians' taking of more than their allotted share of rations. Montcalm's aide, Louis Antoine de Bougainville, observed that attempts to curb that activity would have resulted in the loss of some of these forces. In another prelude of things to come, many prisoners were taken on 23 July in the Battle of Sabbath Day Point, and some of whom were also ritually cannibalized before Montcalm managed to convince the Indians instead to send the captives to Montreal to be sold as slaves.

== Siege ==
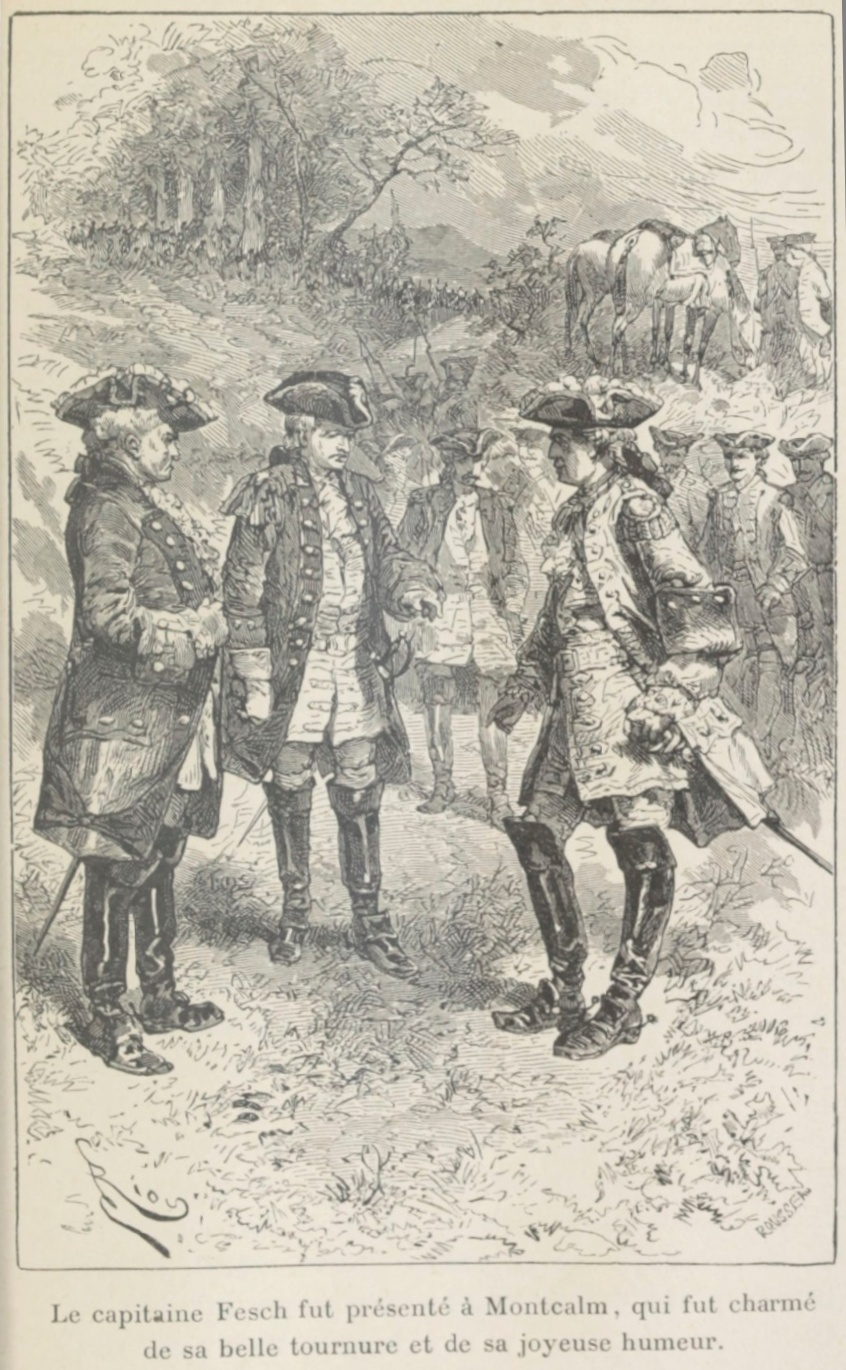
Montcalm talking with an English officer who had come to negotiate the surrender of the fort

While Montcalm's Indian allies had already begun to move south, his advance force of French troops departed from Fort Carillon on 30 July under Lévis' command, traveling overland along Lake George's western shore because the expedition did not have enough boats to carry the entire force. Montcalm and the remaining forces sailed the next day, and met with Lévis for the night at Ganaouske Bay. The next night, Lévis camped just 3 miles (4.8 km) from Fort William Henry, with Montcalm not far behind. Early on the morning of 3 August, Lévis and the Canadians blocked the road between Edward and William Henry, skirmishing with the recently arrived Massachusetts militia. Montcalm summoned Monro to surrender at 11:00 am. Monro refused, and sent messengers south to Fort Edward, indicating the dire nature of the situation and requesting reinforcements. Webb, feeling threatened by Lévis, refused to send any of his estimated 1,600 men north, since they were all that stood between the French and Albany. He wrote to Monro on 4 August that he should negotiate the best terms possible; this communication was intercepted and delivered to Montcalm.

Montcalm, in the meantime, ordered Bourlamaque to begin siege operations. The French opened trenches to the northwest of the fort with the objective of bringing their artillery to bear against the fort's northwest bastion. On 5 August, French guns began firing on the fort from 2,000 yards (1,800 m), a spectacle the large Indian contingent relished. The next day a second battery opened fire from 900 feet (270 m) further along the same trench, creating a crossfire. The effect of the garrison's return fire was limited to driving French guards from the trenches, and some of the fort's guns either were dismounted or burst owing to the stress of use. On 7 August, Montcalm sent Bougainville to the fort under a truce flag to deliver the intercepted dispatch. By then the fort's walls had been breached, many of its guns were useless, and the garrison had taken many casualties. After another day of bombardment by the French, during which their trenches approached another 250 yards (230 m), Monro raised the white flag to open negotiations.

== Massacre ==
The terms of surrender were that the British and their camp followers would be allowed to withdraw, under French escort, to Fort Edward with full honours of war if they refrained from fighting for 18 months. They were allowed to keep their muskets and a single symbolic cannon but no ammunition. In addition, British authorities were to release French prisoners within three months.

Montcalm, before agreeing to these terms, tried to make sure that his Indian allies understood them and that the chiefs would undertake to restrain their men. The process was complicated by the diversity within the Indian camp, which included some warriors who spoke languages that were not understood by any European present. The British garrison was then evacuated from the fort to the entrenched camp, and Monro was quartered in the French camp. The Indians then entered the fort and plundered it and butchered some of the wounded and the sick left behind by the British. The French guards posted around the entrenched camp were only somewhat successful at keeping the Indians out of that area, and it took much effort to prevent plunder and scalping there. Montcalm and Monro initially planned to march the prisoners south the following morning, but after seeing the Indian bloodlust, they decided to attempt the march that night. When the Indians became aware that the British were getting ready to move, many of them massed around the camp, which caused the leaders to call off the march until morning.

The next morning, even before the British column had begun to form up for the march to Fort Edward, the Indians renewed attacks on the largely defenceless British. At 5 a.m., Indians entered huts in the fort that housed wounded British, who were supposed to be under the care of French doctors, and the Indians killed and scalped them. Monro complained that the terms of capitulation had been violated, but his contingent was forced to surrender some of its baggage to be able even to begin the march. As the British marched off, they were harassed by the swarming Indians, who snatched at them, grabbed for weapons and clothing, and pulled away with force those that resisted their actions, including many of the women, children, servants, and slaves. As the last of the men left the encampment, a war whoop sounded, and a contingent of Abenaki warriors seized several men at the rear of the column.

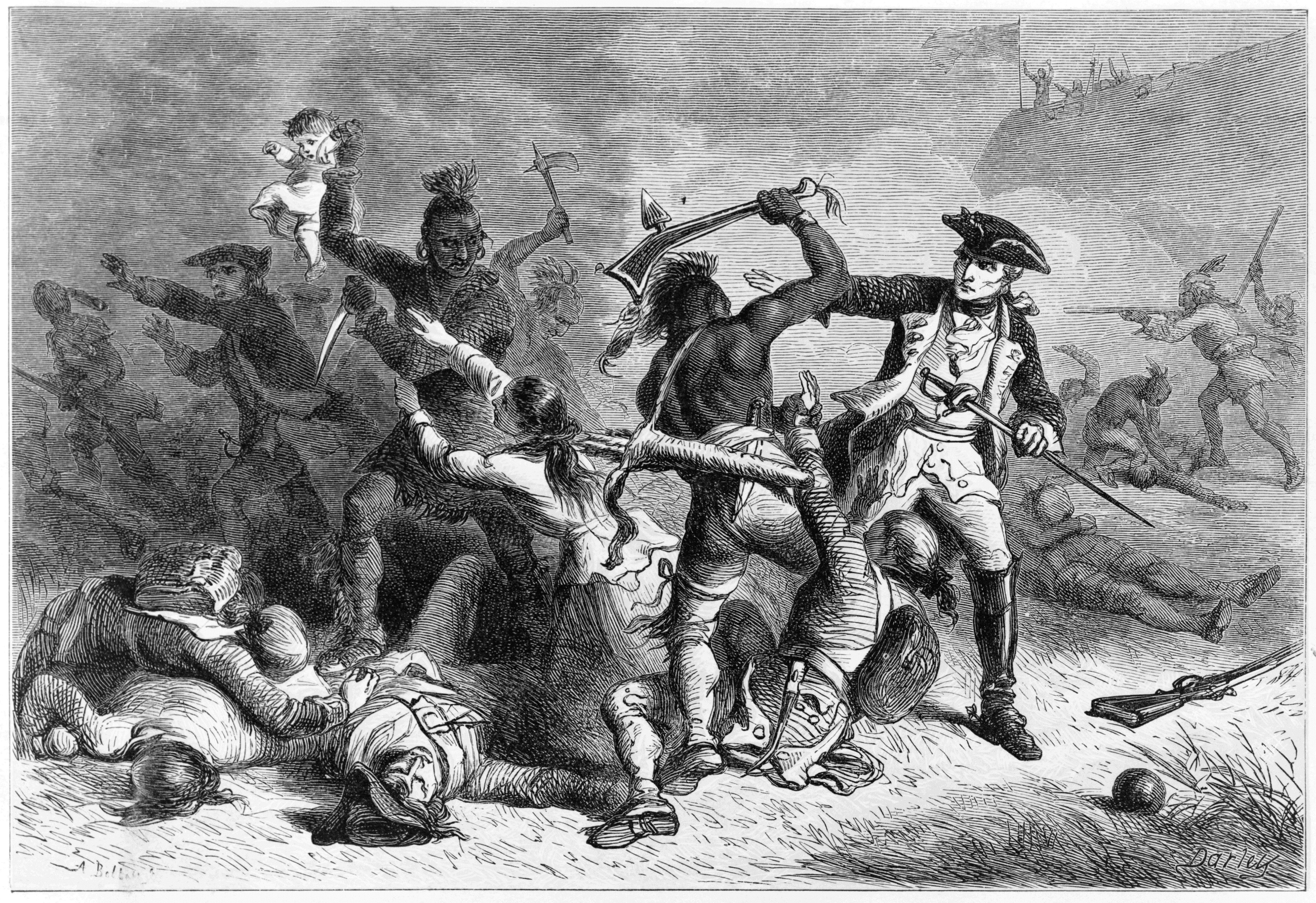
Engraving of Louis-Joseph de Montcalm trying to stop Native Americans from attacking British soldiers and civilians as they leave the fort

Although Montcalm and other French officers attempted to stop further attacks, others did nothing, and some explicitly refused to provide further protection to the British. The column then dissolved, as some tried to escape the Indian onslaught, and others actively tried to defend themselves. Massachusetts Colonel Joseph Frye reported that he was stripped of much of his clothing and repeatedly threatened. He fled into the woods and did not reach Fort Edward until 12 August.

At last with great difficulty the troops got from the Retrenchment, but they were no sooner out than the savages fell upon our rear, killing and scalping, which occasioned an order for a halt, done in great confusion at last, but, as soon as those in the front knew what was doing in the rear they again pressed forward, and thus the confusion continued & encreased till we came to the advanced guard of the French, the savages still carrying away Officers, privates, women and children, some of which later they kill'd & scalpt in the road. This horrid scene of blood and slaughter obliged our officers to apply to the French Guard for protection, which they refus'd told them they must take to the woods and shift for themselves.

— Joseph Frye

Estimates of the numbers killed, wounded, and captives vary widely. Ian Steele has compiled estimates ranging from 200 to 1,500. His detailed reconstruction of the siege and its aftermath indicates that the final tally of British missing and dead among those taken prisoner ranges from 69 to 184, at most 8% of the 2,308 who had surrendered.

== Aftermath ==
The reconstructed fort today

On the afternoon after the massacre, most of the Indians left and headed back to their homes. Montcalm secured the release of 500 captives they had taken, but the Indians still took with them another 200. The French remained at the site for several days, destroyed what remained of the British works, left on 18 August, and returned to Fort Carillon. For unknown reasons, Montcalm decided not to follow up his victory with an attack on Fort Edward. Many reasons have been proposed justifying his decision, including the departure of many but not all of the Indians, a shortage of provisions, the lack of draft animals to assist in the portage to the Hudson, and the need for the Canadian militia to go home in time to participate in the harvest.

Word of the French movements had reached the influential British Indian agent William Johnson on 1 August. Unlike Webb, he acted with haste and arrived at Fort Edward on 6 August with 1,500 militia and 150 Indians. In a move that infuriated Johnson, Webb refused to allow him to advance toward Fort William Henry, apparently in the belief of a French deserter's report that the French army was 11,000 men strong and that any attempt at relief was futile because of the available forces.

=== Return of captives ===
On 14 August, Montcalm wrote letters to Loudoun and Webb and apologized for the behaviour of the Indians but also attempted to justify it. Many captives who were taken to Montreal by the Indians were also eventually repatriated through prisoner exchanges negotiated by Vaudreuil. On 27 September, a small British fleet left Quebec and carried paroled or exchanged prisoners taken in a variety of actions, including those at Fort William Henry and Oswego. When the fleet arrived at Halifax, Nova Scotia, about 300 people captured at Fort William Henry were returned to the colonies. The fleet continued to Europe, where a few more former captives were released. Some of them also eventually returned to the colonies.

=== Consequences ===
Webb was recalled because of his actions. Johnson wrote that Webb was "the only Englishman [I] ever knew who was a coward". Loudoun was also recalled, but that occurred primarily because of the failure of the Louisbourg expedition. Colonel Monro died in November 1757 of apoplexy, which some historians have suggested was caused by anger over Webb's failure to support him.

Loudoun, upset over the event, delayed implementing the release of French prisoners promised as part of the terms of surrender. General James Abercrombie, who succeeded Loudoun as commander-in-chief, was asked by paroled members of the 35th Foot to void the agreement so that they would be free to serve in 1758, which he did, and they went on to serve under General Jeffery Amherst in his successful British expedition against Louisbourg in 1758. Amherst, who also presided over the surrender of Montreal in 1760, refused the surrendering garrisons at Louisbourg and Montreal the normal honours of war, part because of the French failure to uphold the terms of capitulation in the action.

== Legacy ==
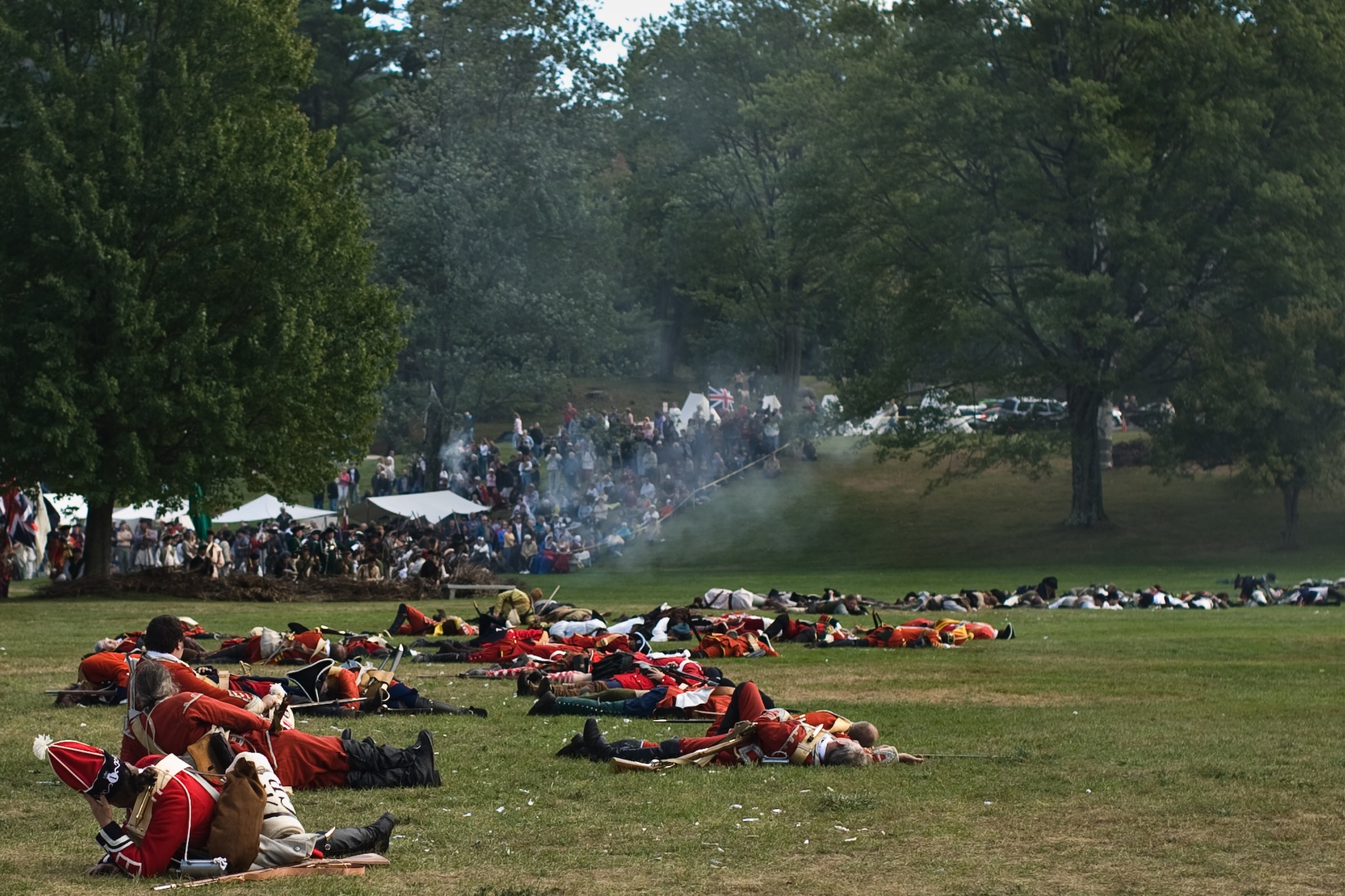
Reenactment of the events on the 250th anniversary

The British and later the Americans never rebuilt anything on the site of Fort William Henry, which lay in ruins for about 200 years. In the 1950s, excavation at the site eventually led to the reconstruction of Fort William Henry as a tourist destination for the town of Lake George.

Many colonial accounts of the time focused on the plundering perpetrated by the Indians and the fact that those who resisted them were killed. The accounts used words like "massacre" even though casualty numbers were uncertain. The later releases of captives did not receive the same level of press coverage. The events of the battle and the subsequent killings were depicted in the 1826 novel The Last of the Mohicans by James Fenimore Cooper and in film adaptations of the book. Cooper's description of the events contains numerous inaccuracies, but his work and the sometimes-lurid descriptions of the event by early historians like Benson Lossing and Francis Parkman led to the belief that many more people died than actually had. Lossing wrote that "fifteen hundred [people] were butchered or carried into hopeless captivity", but many more were captured than killed, and even many of those captured were eventually freed.

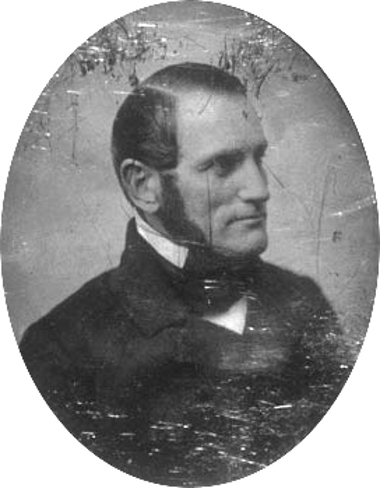
Daguerreotype of Francis Parkman

Historians disagree on where to assign responsibility for the Indian actions. Francis Jennings contends that Montcalm anticipated what was going to happen, deliberately ignored it when it did happen, and stepped in only after the atrocities were well under way. In his opinion, the account by Bougainville, who left for Montreal on the night of 9 August and was not present at the massacre, was written as a whitewash to protect Montcalm. Parkman is more vigorous in his defence of Montcalm by claiming that he and other French officers did what they could to prevent atrocities but were powerless to stop the onslaught.

Ian Steele notes that two primary accounts dominate much of the historical record. The first is the record compiled by Montcalm, including the terms of surrender and his letters to Webb and Loudoun, which received wide publication in the colonies (both French and British) and in Europe. The second was the 1778 publication of a book by Jonathan Carver, an explorer who had served in the Massachusetts militia and had been at the siege. According to Steele, Carver originated, without any supporting analysis or justification, the idea that as many as 1,500 people had been "killed or made prisoner" in his widely-popular work. Yale College President Timothy Dwight, in a history that was posthumously published in 1822, apparently coined the phrase "massacre at Fort William Henry," based on Carver's work. His book and Carver's were likely influences on Cooper, and they tended to fault Montcalm for the Indian transgressions. Steele himself adopts a more nuanced view of the underlying cause of the massacre. Montcalm and the French leaders repeatedly promised the Indians opportunities for the glory and trophies of war, including plunder, scalping, and the taking of captives. In the aftermath of the Battle of Sabbath Day Point, captives taken were ransomed, which meant the Indians had no visible trophies. The terms of surrender at Fort William Henry effectively denied the Indians appreciable opportunities for plunder: the war provisions were claimed by the French army and the personal effects of the British were to stay with them, which left nothing for the Indians. According to Steele, that decision bred resentment, as it appeared that the French were conspiring with their enemies, the British, against their friends, the Indians, who were left without any of the promised war trophies.

Part of the site was scientifically excavated in 1953 by archaeologist Stanley Gifford, and again in the 1990s by a forensic anthropological team led by Maria Liston and Brenda Baker. The latter study found that diseases, in particular smallpox, influenza and tuberculosis brought more casualties than acts of war - with forensic anthropologist Maria Liston declaring that their findings show a group in worse shape and with more pathologies than anything she had ever worked with. They also show that the Indian attack described in The Last of the Mohicans, long thought to have been exaggerated, was in fact understated.
