= François-Pierre Rigaud de Vaudreuil =

Canadian politician

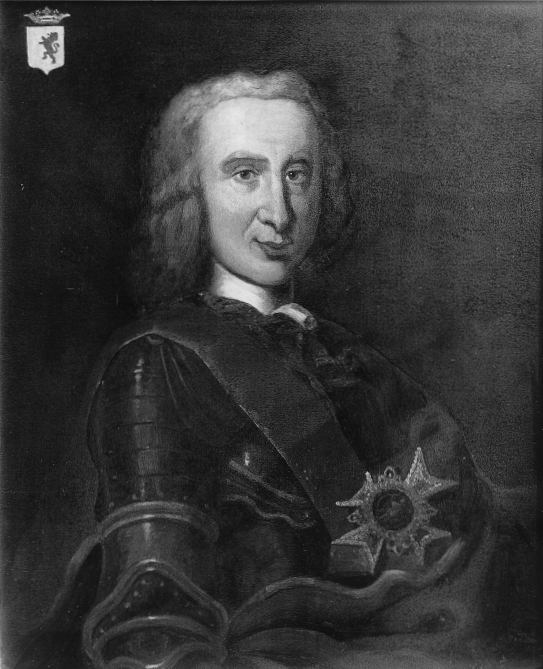
Portrait of François-Pierre de Rigaud de Vaudreuil

François-Pierre de Rigaud de Vaudreuil (February 8, 1703 – August 24, 1779) was a soldier, fur trader, seigneur and administrator in New France. He served as governor of Trois-Rivières from 1749 to 1757 and governor of Montreal from 1757 to 1760.

The son of Philippe de Rigaud de Vaudreuil, governor of New France, and Louise-Élisabeth de Joybert de Soulanges et de Marson, he was born in Montreal and was named to the company of gentlemen midshipmen at the age of five. In 1712, he was named an ensign in the colonial regulars and, in 1720, became a lieutenant. In 1724, he was given command of a company. These posts all came about through the influence of his parents. In 1733, he married Louise, the daughter of Joseph de Fleury de La Gorgendière.

With his brother Pierre de Rigaud, he owned the seigneury of Vaudreuil and, in 1733, they acquired the neighbouring seigneury of Rigaud. In 1736, he was granted the seigneury of Saint-Joseph-de-la-Nouvelle-Beauce. Rigaud de Vaudreuil was named a major in 1741. During the War of the Austrian Succession, he was given the task of defending Fort Saint-Frédéric. In 1748, he was named king's lieutenant for Quebec. Later that year, he acquired another seigneury on the Yamaska River. Rigaud de Vaudreuil was captured by the British while returning from France in 1755; he was able to return to Quebec the following year. In 1756, he led Montcalm's advance guard against British forts in the Oswego region. The following year, he led an expedition which destroyed boats and supplies near Fort George which were intended to be used in an invasion of Canada. After the fall of New France in 1760, Rigaud de Vaudreuil and his brother Pierre de Rigaud, the last Governor-General of New France, were transported back to France by the British. He later died at the Château de Colliers in Muides.

During his life he owned 2 slaves.

== Legacy ==
The town of Rigaud and similarly named geographical features in Quebec take their name from Rigaud de Vaudreuil and his brother Pierre de Rigaud.

== See also ==
- Vaudreuil's Raid, March 1757
