= Fort William Henry =

Fort in State of New York, at the shore of Lake George

Coordinates: 43°25′13″N 73°42′40″W

Site information
- Type: Fort
- Controlled by: Kingdom of Great Britain; New France

Site history
- Built: 1755
- In use: 1755–1757
- Battles/wars: French and Indian War

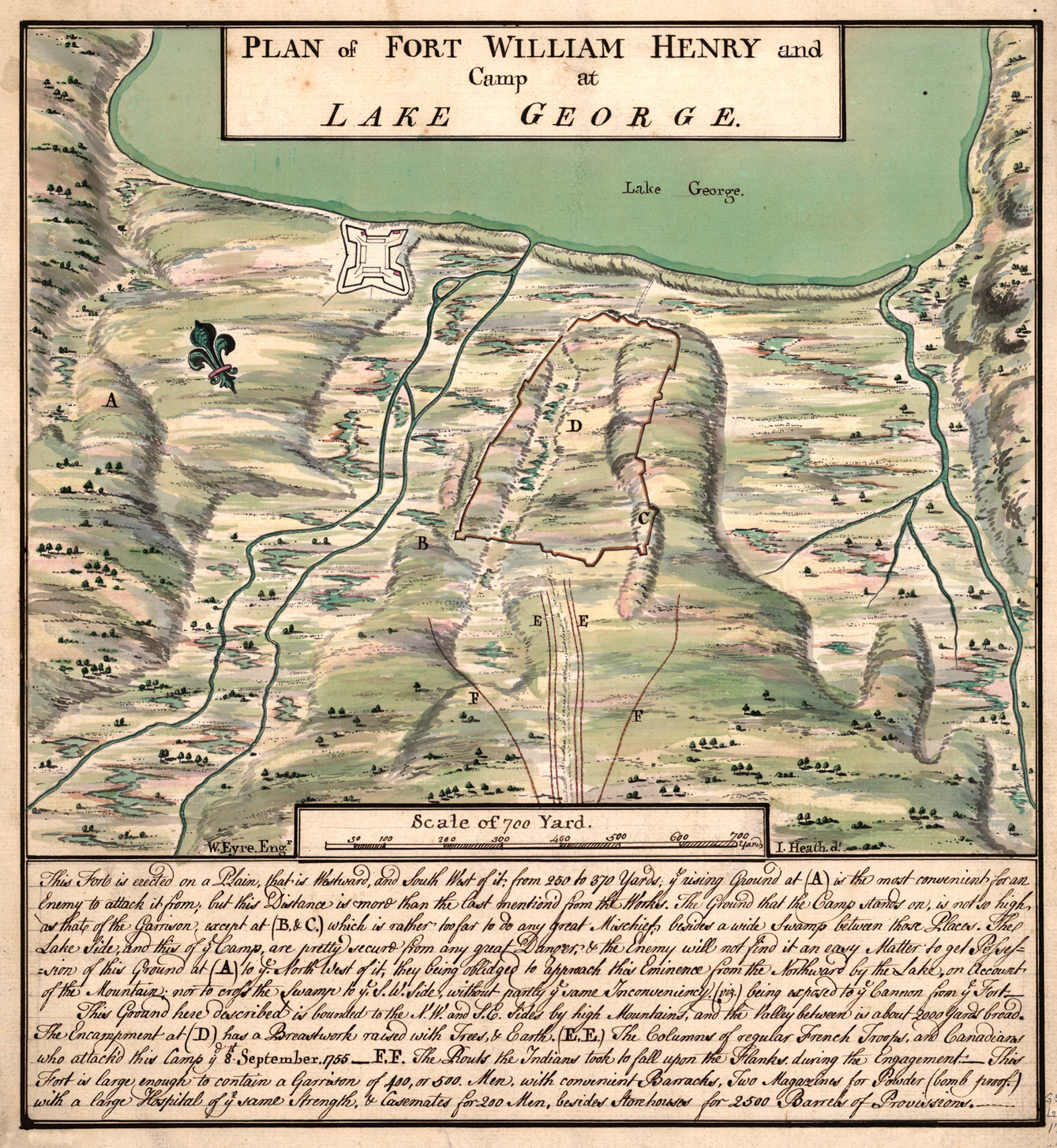
Location of Fort William Henry at the southern end of Lake George

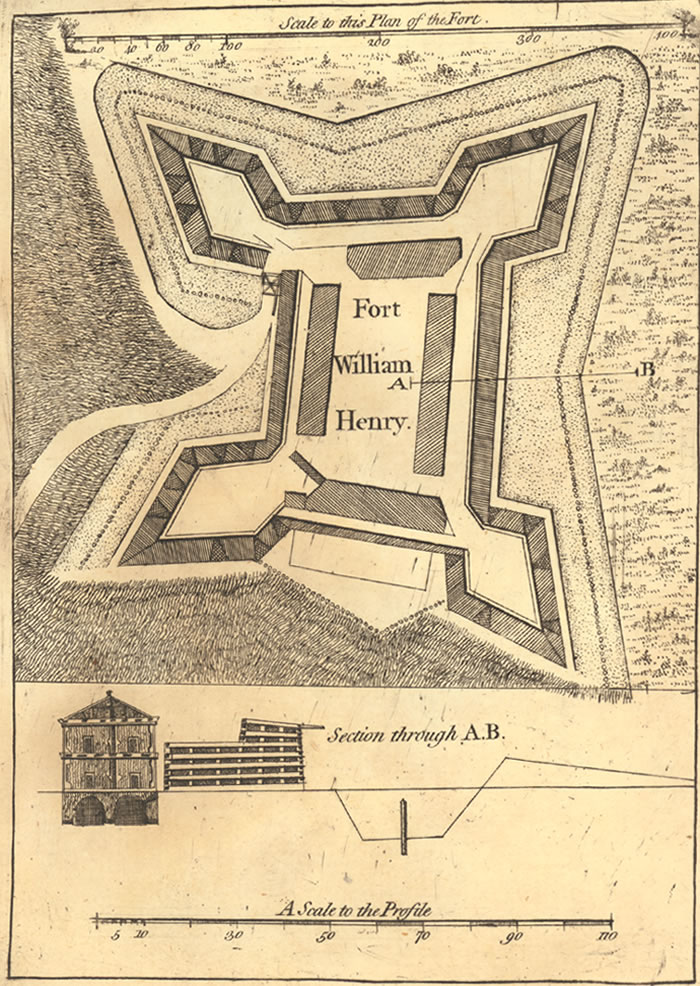
A plan of the fort, published in 1765

Fort William Henry was a British fort at the southern end of Lake George, in the province of New York. The fort's construction was ordered by Sir William Johnson in September 1755, during the French and Indian War, as a staging ground for attacks against the French position at Fort St. Frédéric. It was part of a chain of British and French forts along the important inland waterway from New York City to Montreal, and occupied a key forward location on the frontier between New York and New France. In 1757, the French general Louis-Joseph de Montcalm conducted a successful siege that forced the British to surrender. The Huron warriors who accompanied the French army subsequently killed many of the British prisoners. The siege and massacre were portrayed in James Fenimore Cooper's novel The Last of the Mohicans.

The fort was named for both Prince William, Duke of Cumberland, the younger son of King George II, and Prince William Henry, Duke of Gloucester and Edinburgh, a grandson of King George II and a younger brother of the future King George III. After the 1757 siege, the French destroyed the fort and withdrew. While other forts were built nearby in later years, the site of Fort William Henry lay abandoned for two centuries. In the 19th century, the ruins of the fort became a destination for tourists. Interest in the history of the site revived in the 1950s, and a replica of the fort was constructed. It is now operated as a living museum and a popular tourist attraction in the village of Lake George.

== Construction ==
In 1755, Sir William Johnson, British Indian Supervisor of the Northeast, established a military camp at the southern end of Lake George, with the objective of launching an attack on Fort St. Frédéric, a French fort at Crown Point on Lake Champlain. The French commander, Baron Dieskau, decided to launch a preemptive attack on Johnson's support base at Fort Edward on the Hudson River. Their movements precipitated the British victory in the Battle of Lake George on September 8, 1755, part of which was fought on the ground of Johnson's Lake George camp. Following the battle, Johnson decided to construct a fortification near the site, while the French began construction of Fort Carillon near the northern end of the lake.

Design and construction of the new fortification was overseen by British military engineer William Eyre of the 44th Foot. Fort William Henry was an irregular square fortification with bastions on the corners, in a design that was intended to repel Indian attacks, but not necessarily withstand attack from an enemy armed with artillery. Its walls were 30 feet (9.1 m) thick, with log facings around an earthen filling. Inside the fort were wooden barracks two stories high, built around the parade ground. Its magazine was in the northeast bastion, and its hospital was located in the southeast bastion. The fort was surrounded on three sides by a dry moat, with the fourth side sloping down to the lake. The only access to the fort was by a bridge across the moat. The fort could house 400 to 500 men; additional troops were quartered in an entrenched camp 750 yards (690 m) southeast of the fort, near the site of the 1755 Battle of Lake George.

== Occupation ==
The fort was ready for occupancy, if not fully complete, on November 13, 1755. Eyre served as its first commander, with a garrison consisting of companies from his 44th, as well as several companies of Rogers' Rangers.

In the spring of 1757, command of the fort was turned over to George Monro, with a garrison principally drawn from the 35th Foot and the 60th (Royal American) Foot. By June the garrison had swollen to about 1,600 men with the arrival of provincial militia companies from Connecticut and New Jersey. Because the fort was too small to quarter this many troops, many of them were stationed in Johnson's old camp to the southwest of the fort. When word arrived in late July that the French had mobilized to attack the fort, another 1,000 regulars and militia arrived, swelling Monro's force to about 2,300 effective troops. Johnson's camp, where many were quartered, was quickly protected by the digging of trenches. Conditions in both the fort and the camp were not good, and many men were ill, including some with smallpox.

== Siege ==
In February of 1757, the Governor-General in Canada, or New France, Pierre de Rigaud, marquis de Vaudreuil-Cavagnial sent about 1500 men south to attack Fort William Henry which the French called Fort Guillaume-Henri. The initial French attack failed.

A renewed stronger French attack was initiated in the summer of 1757. On August 3, 1757, a force commanded by General Louis-Joseph de Montcalm arrived and established camps to the south and the west of the fort. The French forces totaled some 8,000, consisting of 3,000 regulars, 3,000 militia and nearly 2,000 Native Americans from various tribes, more than double the British forces. French siege operations included heavy bombardment by cannon from opposite sides of the fort that alternated as one side bombarded while the other side dug new defensive trenches that grew closer and closer to the fort's walls. Over the six-day siege, the fort's cannons began breaking down and running low on ammunition. British Colonel Monro hoped and expected reinforcements from General Daniel Webb, who commanded Fort Edward, 14 miles (23 km) to the south. Despite Monro's pleas for help sent by messenger, Webb declined to send reinforcements for fear that the large French force would attack Fort Edward next. On August 8, the British surrendered the fort after they negotiated terms with the French that permitted the British to withdraw to Fort Edward under French protection, leave their ammunition at the fort, and agree to take no further part in the war until they had been properly exchanged. The British forces were allowed full honours of war, could keep their colours, muskets with no ammunition, and a single symbolic cannon. The fort would be turned over to the French. The British authorities were to release French prisoners within three months. The explicit terms of surrender were signed by both Montcalm and Monro.

France's Indian allies began plundering the fort almost immediately and killing the sick and wounded British. As surrendering British troops and associated civilians, including about 100 women, left for the march to Fort Edward, they were attacked by Indian troops. France's Indian allies first took the British weapons and possessions. Warriors then began seizing persons at the rear of the column and killed and scalped them. The column dissolved as some British tried to escape the onslaught by fleeing into the woods, and others tried to defend themselves. The promised French protection failed to materialize. All of the women and the children were killed, along with many British and militia soldiers. Estimates of the numbers captured, wounded, or killed have varied widely between 200 and 1,500. The lowest estimate of missing and dead ranges from 69 to 184 (at most 7.5%) of the 2,308 who had surrendered to the French. Dodge's estimate, based upon contemporaneous diaries, letters, and reports, is that 429 of the fort's 2300 occupants reached Fort Edward, and 406 were killed (97 during the siege and 308 during the massacre), with 536 persons "missing," and 929 taken prisoner. Another history puts British losses at "upwards of 700."

The Indians killed occupants of the fort and the unarmed British soldiers whom the French had allowed to leave the fort, as well as women, children, and British-affiliated Native Americans. Rufus Putnam described the tragedy in his memoirs: "The Indians fell on them, and a most horrid butchery ensued, those who escaped with their lives were stripped almost naked, many in making their escape were lost in the woods where they wandered for several days without food, one man in particular was out ten days and there is reason to believe some perished, in particular the wounded...."

In the 1990s, forensic anthropologists excavated human remains at Fort William Henry. They found "extensive evidence of this massacre, documenting the fact that atrocities were committed", such as beheadings, mutilations ("including genital mutilations"), and disemboweling. The lead anthropologist stated that "a lot of the soldiers [they] found died from blows to the head".

== Abandonment ==
After the siege, the French systematically destroyed the fort before returning to Fort Carillon. The site lay abandoned for 200 years until a replica fort was reconstructed in the 1950s. During the production of the 1992 epic war film The Last of the Mohicans, a $1 million copy of Fort William Henry was built on Lake James in western North Carolina.
