= Battle of Lake George =

1755 Seven Years' War battle

- Part of the French and Indian War
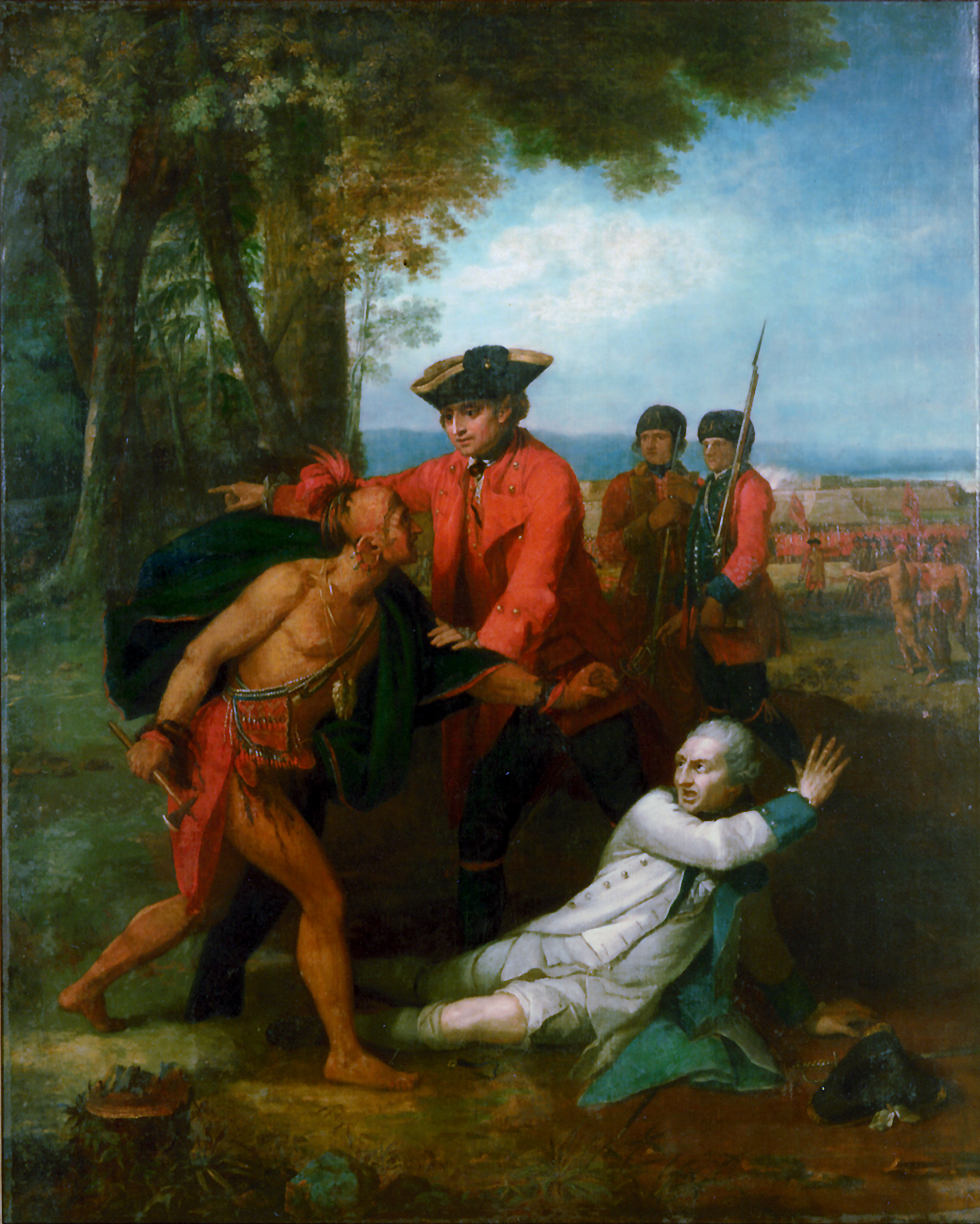
- 1764–1768 painting of William Johnson saving Baron Dieskau's life after the battle
Date	8 September 1755
Location	Lake George, New York 43°24′54″N 73°42′25″W
Result	Anglo-Haudenosaunee Victory

Belligerents
Great Britain; British America; Mohawk	France: New France; Kahnawake; Abenaki; Nipissing

Commanders and leaders
William Johnson; William Eyre; Ephraim Williams †; Phineas Lyman; Hendrick Theyanoguin †	(Kingdom of France) Baron Dieskau (surrendered) (New France) Jacques Legardeur de Saint-Pierre †

Strength
~1,720 militia ~200 Indians	~220 French regulars ~600 Canadian militia ~600 Indians

Casualties and losses
See Casualties	See Casualties

The Battle of Lake George was fought on 8 September 1755, in the north of the Province of New York. It was part of a campaign by the British to expel the French from North America, during the French and Indian War.

General Jean Erdman, Baron Dieskau led a force of French regulars and Canadian and Caughnawaga irregulars against Sir William Johnson and his army consisting solely of colonial irregulars and Haudenosaunee (Six Nations Iroquois) warriors under Hendrick Theyanoguin. The battle ended in victory for the British and their allies.

The battle is perhaps best known for the death of Hendrick Theyanoguin, and its success led to the creation of a baronetcy for Sir William Johnson. Afterward, Johnson built Fort William Henry in order to consolidate his gains.

== Background ==
Throughout the 1750s, French and British interests in the New World clashed, with the French establishing Forts along the Ohio River to the St. Lawrence. Under the Governance of the Marquis de Vardreuil, interests in New France sought to expand. General Edward Braddock arrived at Virginia in February 1755, and called a meeting of Provincial Governors in Alexandria, where four campaigns were established: Charles Lawrence would reduce Nova Scotia; Braddock would secure the Ohio Valley; Governor William Shirley would capture Fort Niagara; and Sir William Johnson – who had no experience in war –would secure Fort St. Frederic at Crown Point, a keystone in the defense of Canada.

Johnson and his second in command Colonel Phineas Lyman assembled their regiments in Albany, only one of which was uniformed. The overall force consisted of 4,500 volunteers from Massachusetts; 500 from New Hampshire; 400 from Rhode Island; and 800 from New York. The men had no bayonets, but carried an Indian axe or tomahawk in their waistbelts. Johnson's force arrived via waggon at the southern end of Lac du Saint Sacrement on 28th of August 1755, and renamed it "Lake George" in honor of his sovereign, George II, and established a 14 mile long road to it from Lake Champlain. Johnson later wrote that "no house was ever built, nor a rod of land cleared; and the lake which the French call St. Sacrament, I have given the name of Lake George, not only in honour of his majesty, but to assert his undoubted dominion here." Meanwhile, elements of his militia were establishing Fort William Henry and Fort Lyman, later known as Fort Edwards.

French forces under the command of Jean Erdman, Baron Dieskau, planned an attack on Oswego, moving up the St. Lawrence River with 3,573 men: 700 regular French soldiers; 1,600 Canadian militia men, who had been called away from their farms, and around 600 Christian Iroquois and Abenakis from Sault and Two Mountains. However, intelligence delivered by a commissaire suggested that Johnson was two days march from Crown Point, and so Dieskau postponed his attack on Oswego. However, upon arrival at Crown Point, Dieskau found no British soldiers.

=== Planned assault on Fort Edwards ===
On the 27 August, a Canadian named Boileau informed Dieskau that 3,000 English were at Fort Lyman, later known as Fort Edwards. Dieskau sought to establish a position from which he could intercept Johnson's advance, or attack them, and so moved his encampment 9 miles south between to Fort Carillon, the precursor of Fort Ticonderoga. While there, Abenaki scouts captured a prisoner, who insisted only 500 soldiers were present at Fort Lyman. Dieskau realised that if he successfully attacked the base, he could cut off English supplies and assault their rear.

On the 2 September, Dieskau split his force into a column of 1,500 men, leaving half his force at Fort Ticonderoga, later known as Carillon, and embarked on an alternate route to the Hudson by landing his men at South Bay and then marching them east of Lake George along Wood Creek. Dieskau arrived at the road cut by Johnson to Lake George on the evening of the 7th of September, with around 200 French. Johnson, camped 14 miles (23 km) north of Fort Edward at the southern end of Lake George, was alerted by scouts to the presence of enemy forces to the south, and he dispatched a messenger to warn the 500-man garrison at Fort Edward. The messenger was intercepted, and shot, and later a group of waggoners were captured. As a result, the disposition of all of Johnson's forces, some 3,000 men, became known to Dieskau.

=== Move to Lake George ===
Dieskau wished to take the fort by surprise at sundown, but the Abenaki Indians in the French party, after holding council, initially declined to assault Fort Edward because they expected it to be defended with cannons; but later consented, and whether purposefully or not, overshot the fort by three miles, thwarting the assault. On the morning of the 8th of September, Dieskau changed tack and began an advance of 11 miles towards Lake George. This was fortunate, for if they had attacked Fort Edward, they would have caught Johnson's force unprepared. Johnson later wrote: "Happily for us he complied (with the proposition of the Indians), for he would have found our troops separately encamped out of the works and no cannon there, and his victory would have probably been a very cheap one, and made way for another here."

Concurrently, Johnson was aware of the French presence at the Fort, and hold an emergency council. At the council, an unidentified Mohawk said of the French "If they are to fight they are too few; if they are to be killed they are too many." In response, he suggested the British divide into three columns, picking up three sticks: "Put these together and you can't break them; take them up one by one and you may easily break them." At 9:00 a.m. on 8 September, Johnson sent Colonel Ephraim Williams south to reinforce Fort Edward with 200 Mohawks under Hendrick Theyanoguin and 1,000 troops from Williams' Massachusetts Regiment and Colonel Nathan Whiting's Connecticut Regiment. At 10 am, his scouts informed him that about 1,000 men were advancing towards them. Dieskau, warned by a deserter of Williams' approach, blocked the portage road with his French grenadiers and sent his Canadians and Indians to ambush the British from both sides of the road. Dieskau positioned his ambush south of the road, his native soldiers on the left flank, with the Canadians behind them. The French waited in front. They lay in wait in a ravine three miles south of the present-day village of Lake George.

=== Order of battle ===
Both the British and French forces were initially large, but contingents had broken off for the engagement at Lake George as mentioned previously. They are as follows:

British

Sir William Johnson commanded 1,500 colonial militiamen; 300 Six Nations Haudenosaunee and Mohawks under the command of Hendrick Theyanoguin. Later, 220 militiamen were sent to reinforce Johnson. Johnson had no regulars.

French

After leaving half his force at Lake Champlain, the French column consisted of 1,500 men, consisting of 220 regular grenadiers of the Régiment de la Reine(Queen's), and the Régiment de Languedoc; 680 Canadian militiamen; and 600 Kahnawake Iroquois, Abenaki and Nipissing warriors, many of whom were Christians.

The column was under the command of Dieskau, his second in command Pierre-Andre Gohin de Montreuil, Jacques Legardeur de Saint-Pierre, both highly respected French officers. The troops carried ten days' provisions and were in light marching order.

== Battle ==
=== "Bloody Morning Scout" ===
Etching from Butler's "Lake George and Lake Champlain," showing the 'Bloody Morning Scout' in detail.

The approaching British column was under the command of Colonel Ephraim Williams, was accompanied by 300 Six Nation Haudenosaunee and Mohawks under the command of Hendrick Theyanoguin. The force was inexperienced, and had placed no scouts ahead of them, assuming no immediate danger.

Shortly before the ambush was triggered, some Christian Iroquois rose from the ground to observe the approaching column, and seeing relatives, fired warning shots into the air. This effectively triggered the ambush, and the unprepared column collapsed, engulfed in a blaze of enemy musketry, and in the words of Dieskau: "folded like a pack of cards." During the ambush, Jacques Legardeur de Saint-Pierre, a highly respected officer commanding Dieskau's Canadian and Indian forces, was killed. His fall caused great dismay, particularly to the French Indians.

The ambush became known as the "Bloody Morning Scout." Colonel Ephraim Williams mounted a rock to better observe the ambush, and was killed early in the action; Hendrick Theyanoguin, too corpulent to travel on foot, had his horse shot from under him and was bayonetted. Most of the New Englanders fled toward Johnson's camp while about 100 of their comrades under Whiting and Lt. Col. Seth Pomeroy and most of the surviving Mohawks covered their withdrawal with an attempted stand, before retreating. The British rearguard was able to inflict substantial casualties on their overconfident pursuers. Pomeroy noted that his men "killed great numbers of them; they were seen to drop like pigeons".

=== Retreat to Johnson's camp ===
Etching from Butler's "Lake George and Lake Champlain," showing the position of the French attack relative to Johnson's Camp.

After the collapse of the British column under the weight of Dieskau's ambush, panic ensued, and the British retreated to three miles back camp without order, the French following them. However, the French Iroquois and Abenakis did not accompany the pursuit; the Abenakis had seized Mohawk prisoners and the Christian Iroquois insisted upon their release, many staying to loot and scalp the dead British.

At Johnson's camp, musket fire had been heard for an hour and a half, and wounded and fleeing soldiers had begun to arrive. Expecting an impending French attack, Johnson constructed hasty defensive barricades of "wagons, overturned boats and hewn-down trees". He also scattered men among the trees on his flanks.

Dieskau formed his French grenadiers into a column, six abreast, and led them in person along the lake road, looking for an attack. However, with their morale already shaken by the loss of Legardeur de Saint Pierre, the Caughnawagas "did not wish to attack an entrenched camp, the defenders of which included hundreds of their Mohawk kinsmen. The Abenakis would not go forward without the Caughnawagas, and neither would the Canadians," leaving a diminished and unsupported French force advancing on Johnson's camp. Rather, the Canadians and Indigenous soldiers scattered among the trees, providing limited fire.

Once the French grenadiers were out in the open ground, British gunners crewing Johnson's three cannons under the Command of Captain William Eyre, loaded them with grapeshot and cut "lanes, streets and alleys" through the advancing French ranks, scattering the French amid the rough cover. When Johnson was wounded and retired to his tent for treatment, Major-general Phineas Lyman took over command.

In response to the withering artillery fire, Dieskau gathered a force for an assault on the right flank, but was shot three times, once in the knee, while calling on Canadians to advance. His second in command Pierre-Andre Gohin de Montreuil, placed him against a tree stump, commanding two Canadians to move him to safety, but one was shot and died across Dieskau's legs, the other abandoning his post. Shortly afterwards, at around 4 pm, the French retreat sounded.

After the French withdrawal, the British found about 20 severely wounded Frenchmen who were lying too close to the British artillery's field of fire for their comrades to retrieve them. Among them was Dieskau, who was shot through the groin by a former French soldier fighting for the British believing he had a pistol.

=== Secondary Action: The "Bloody Pond" ===
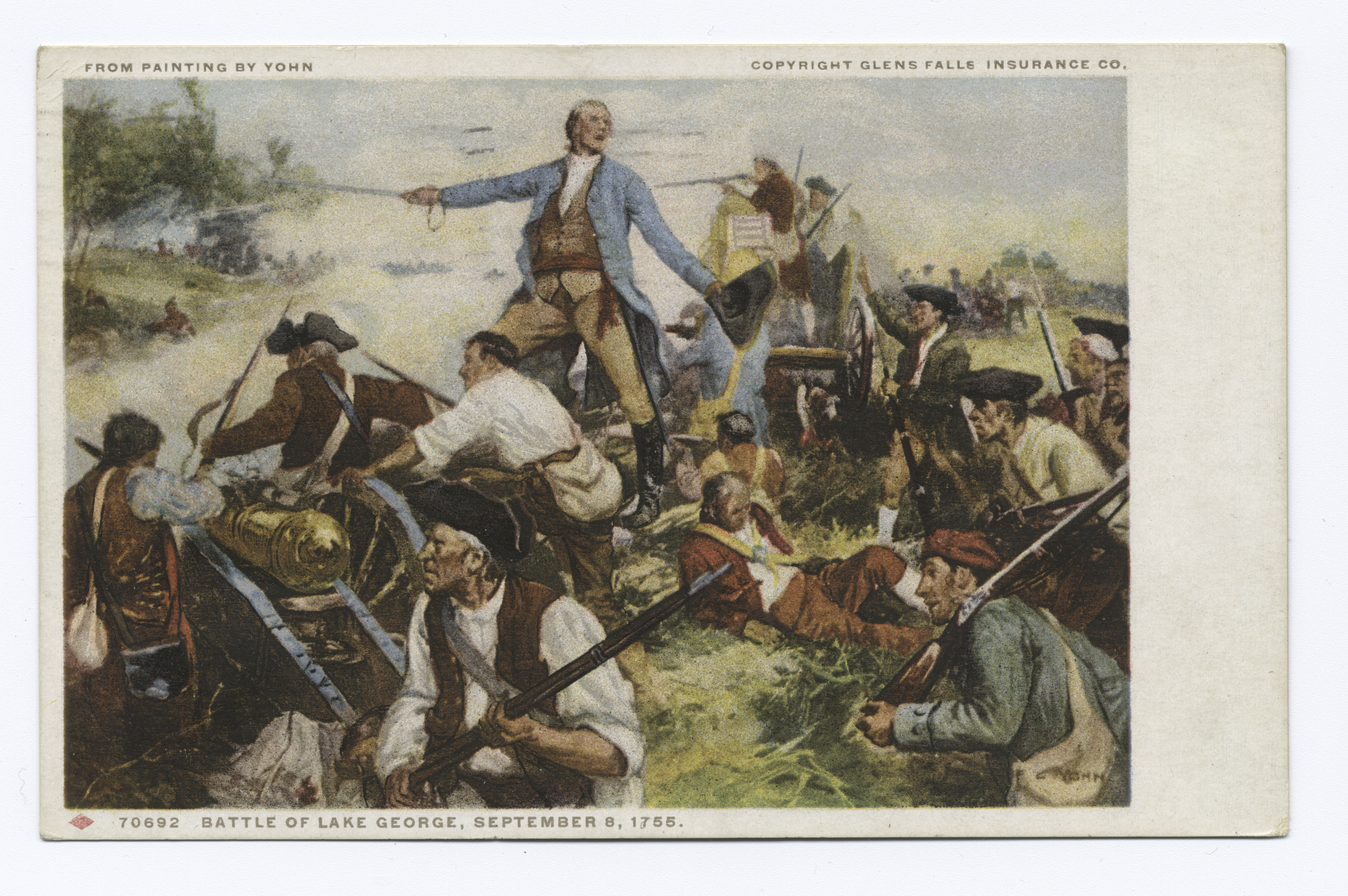
Postcard of Battle of Lake George from painting by F.C.Yohn (1900)

Meanwhile, Colonel Joseph Blanchard, commander of Fort Edward, saw the smoke from The Battle of Lake George, dispatched 80 soldiers of the New Hampshire Provincial Regiment under Nathaniel Folsom, and 40 New York Provincials under Captain McGinnis to reconnoitre.

Between 4 and 5 pm, they came across the scene of the ambush that had taken place earlier in the day, and found French Canadians and Indigenous warriors scalping and looting the dead British. The following account details the incident:

"Hearing the report of guns in the direction of the Lake, they pressed forward, and when within about two miles of it, fell in with the baggage of the French army protected by a guard, which they immediately attacked and dispersed. About four o'clock in the afternoon, some 300 of the French army appeared in sight. They had rallied, and retreating in tolerable order. Capt. Folsom posted his men among the trees, and as the enemy approached, they poured in upon them a well directed and galling fire. He continued the attack in this manner till prevented by darkness, killing many of the enemy, taking some of them prisoners, and finally driving them from the field. He then collected his own wounded, and securing them with many of the enemy's packs, he brought his prisoners and booty safe into camp. The next day the rest of the baggage was brought in, thus securing the entire baggage and ammunition of the French army. In this brilliant affair, Folsom lost only six men, but McGinnis was mortally wounded, and died soon after. The loss of the French was very considerable."

McGinnis was returned to Fort Edward, but died of his wounds two days later. The bodies of the French troops who were killed in this engagement (actually Canada-born French colonials and their Native American allies, not French regulars) were thrown into the pool "which bears to this day the name of Bloody Pond".

== Aftermath ==
Baron Dieskau was abandoned by the French on the field, and was carried on a blanket to the tent of William Johnson, where he declared his rank. The Six Nations Haudenosaunee and Mohawks sought to burn Dieskau for his role in the killing of Hendrick Theyanoguin, but Johnson protected him. This event would be immortalised in a portrait by Benjamin West, of Johnson saving Baron Dieskau from the clutches of a Mohawk warrior.

The French would go on to fortify Fort Ticonderoga, and Johnson would attempt to dislodge them with an expedition. Johnson's expedition eventually stopped short of Fort St. Frédéric and the strategic result at Lake George was significant. Johnson was able to advance a considerable distance down the lake and consolidated his gains by building Fort William Henry at its southern end. Historian Fred Anderson writes that had Dieskau succeeded in halting Johnson at Fort Edward, it would have not only ended the threat to Fort St. Frédéric but would also "roll back New York's and New England's defenses to Albany itself".

== Casualties ==
There are as many conflicting accounts of both the casualties suffered at Lake George, and the battle.

=== Contemporary reportage ===
Contemporary reports suggested that the French lost 120, with 123 wounded, although some suggest a number as high as 500. The British saw 120 killed, 80 wounded, and 62 missing in the defence of Johnson's Camp; 38 Haudenosaunee and Mohawks killed, with 12 wounded; and 17 officers killed, with 12 wounded. A letter of 20 October 1755, from Monsieur Doreil to the Comte d'Argenson, a senior French commander in North America, suggests that French lost more than a third of their total strength: the Regiment de la Reine had 21 killed or missing and 30 wounded, while the Regiment de Languedoc had 5 killed and 21 wounded.

Of the Battle, Dieskau wrote extensively from his captivity. He claimed, "the New Englanders fought in the morning like good boys, at noon like men, and in the afternoon like devils."

=== Modern revision ===
Modern historians however suggest higher death tolls: Peter Palmer states in his history that "the loss of the English this day was about two hundred and sixteen killed and ninety-six wounded; of the French the loss was much greater." He claims Johnson estimated the French loss at five to six hundred, while stating that another source noted it as "a little short of eight hundred". W. Max Reid says, "The English loss in killed, wounded, and missing at the battle of Lake George was 262, and that of the French, by their own account, was 228".

Ian K. Steele says of the British losses, "The official returns, corrected, read 154 dead, 103 wounded, and 67 missing. Most of those listed as missing had not deserted into woods full of Canadians and Indians; most of the missing were later found dead. Pomeroy was preoccupied with the losses, but overlooked the Haudenosaunee casualties, which brought the totals to 223 dead and about 108 wounded". Of the French losses, Steele says, "The official French journal of the operation probably minimized Indian casualties in a total count of 149 dead, 163 wounded, and 27 taken prisoner. The reported number of those killed, wounded, and captured was remarkably close on both sides, with those fighting for the English losing 331 and the French, 339." Steele does not give a reason for his suspicion that the Indian casualties were under-reported.

In his 2009 book, Combattre pour la France en Amérique, Marcel Fournier diverges considerably from the other sources in reporting the casualties for the Battle of Lac St-Sacrement (as the French called it) at 800 killed or wounded for the British and 200 killed or wounded for the French.

== Legacy ==
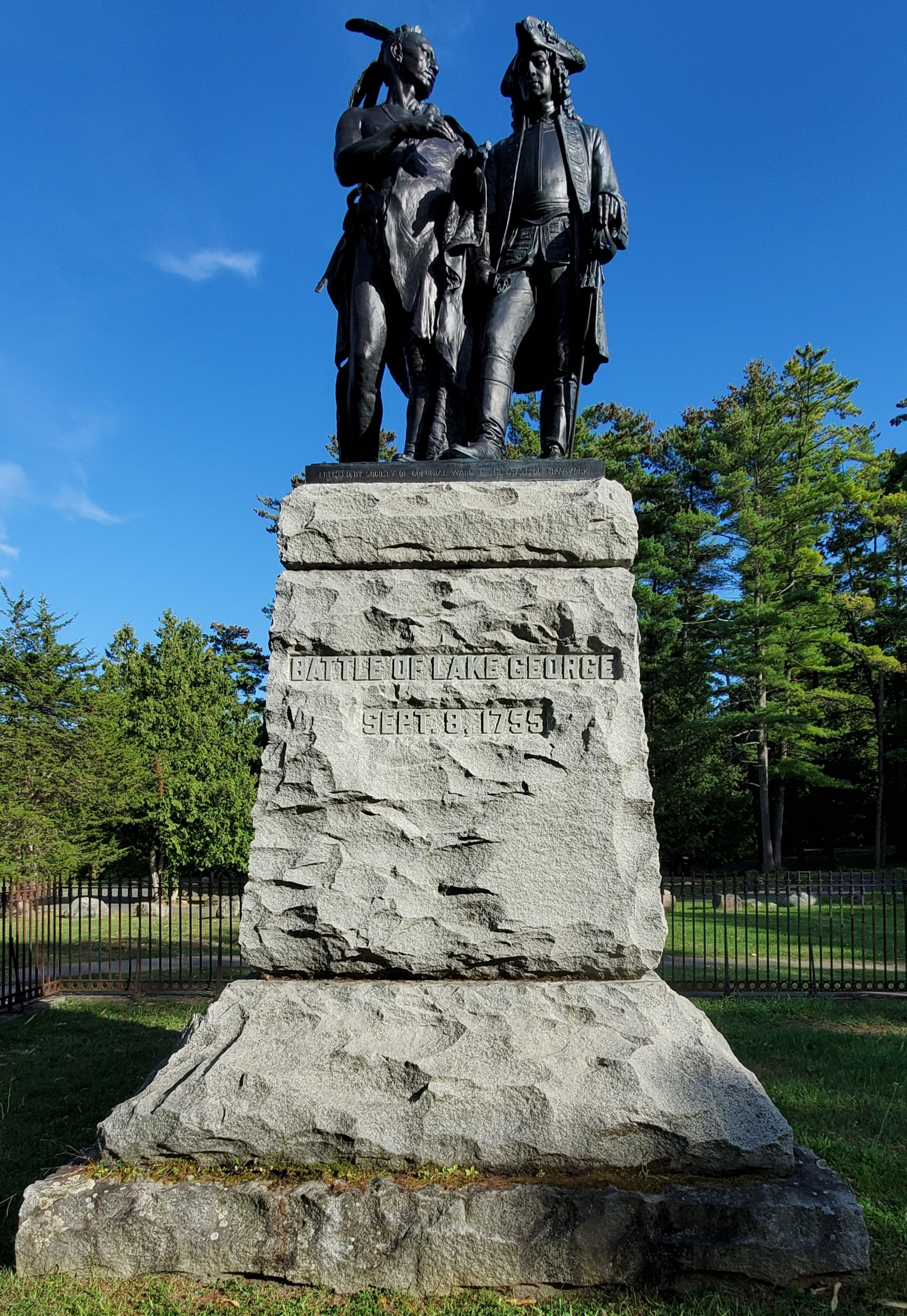
The Battle of Lake George (1903) by Albert Weinert depicting Hendrick Theyanoguin and William Johnson

The Battle was notable, for it lead to the cult status of both Sir William Johnson, and Baron Dieskau.

In England, the Battle was hailed as a victory. The change of the Lake's name to Lake George, and the construction of two Forts named for the King's grandsons William Henry (named for Prince William Henry, Duke of Gloucester and Edinburgh) and Edward (named for Prince Edward, Duke of York and Albany) led to favourable opinion. As a reward for his role in defeating the French, Johnson received a baronetcy, and £5,000. Baron Dieskau on the other hand, was censured for his defeat, and sent much of the rest of his life in captivity, returning to France in 1763, where he died.

Shortly before the Battle, Ephraim Williams executed a will at Albany, for the foundation of Williams College, which would serve in his name as a memorial to his love of science, his death in the battle actively contributed to the foundation of the college.

== Map gallery ==
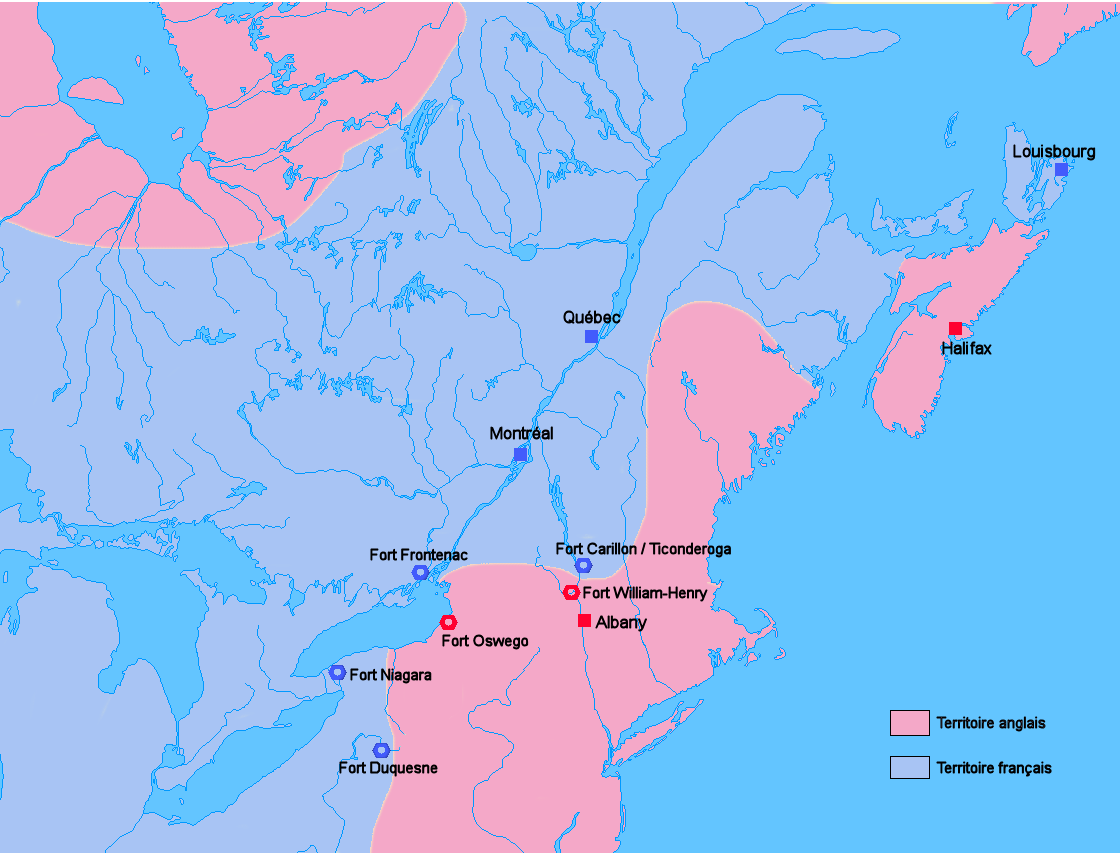
Map showing location of fighting in the French and Indian War

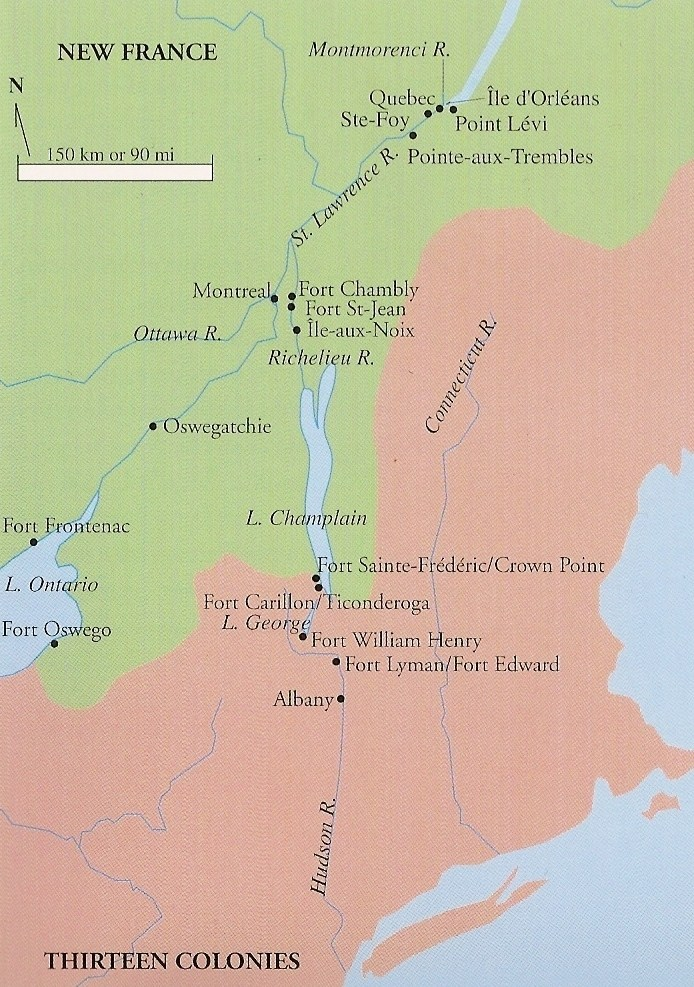
French forts on Lake George.

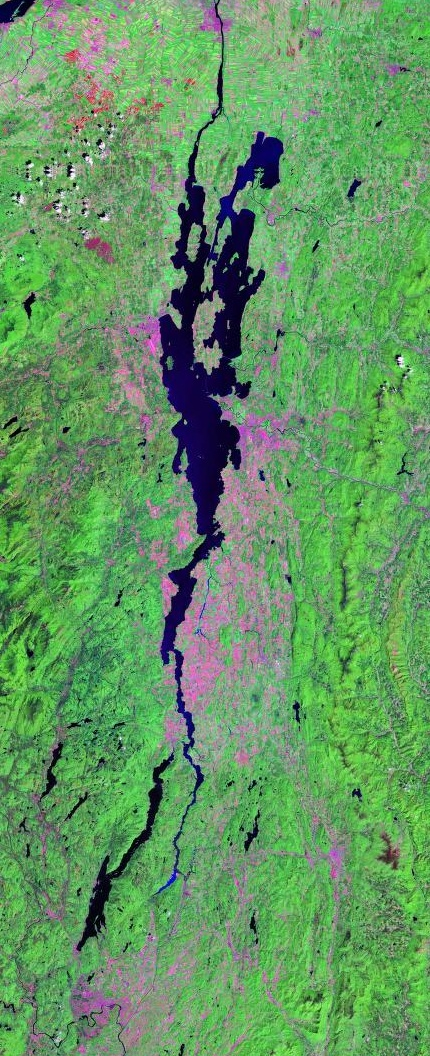
Landsat photo of lakes Champlain and George and portions of the Hudson and Richelieu rivers

Map showing the Lake Champlain and Richelieu River watershed

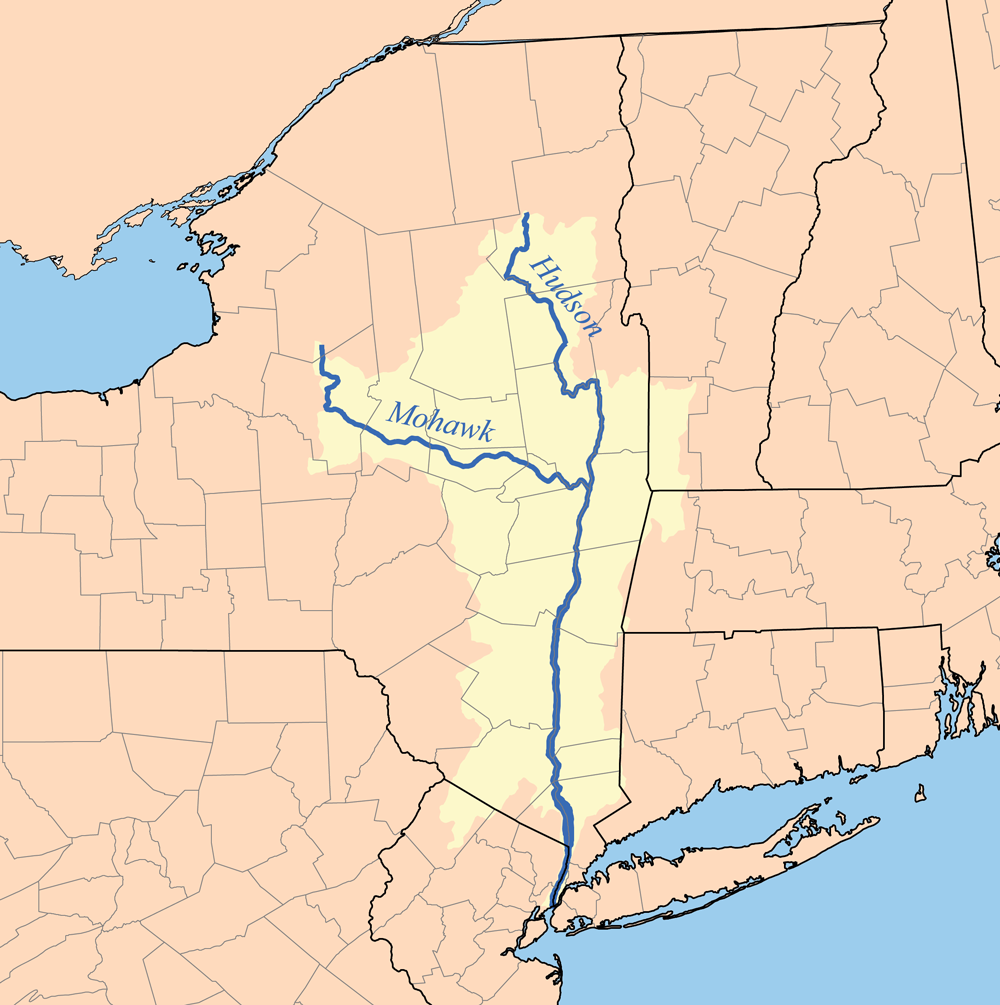
The watershed of the Hudson and Mohawk rivers

== See also ==
- Battle of Lake Champlain
- Thomas Johnston - engraver of first historical print in America, A prospective plan of the battle fought near Lake George on the 8th of September 1755.
- Lake George Battlefield Park Historic District
