= Daniel Webb (British Army officer) =

British Army officer (1700-1773)

Lieutenant-General Daniel Webb
- Born: c. 1700; Great Britain
- Died: 11 November 1773 (aged c. 73) Great Britain
- Allegiance: Great Britain
- Branch: British Army
- Service years: 1720–1761
- Rank: Lieutenant-General
- Conflicts: War of the Austrian Succession; Battle of Dettingen; Battle of Fontenoy; Seven Years' War; French and Indian War; Siege of Havana
- Children: Mary Webb

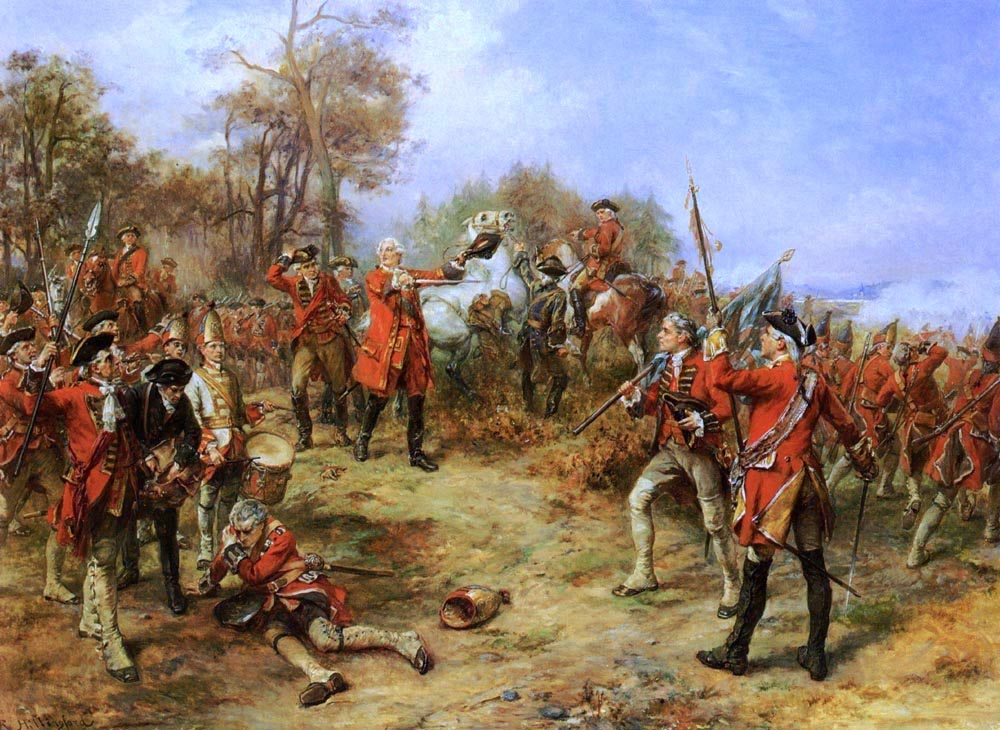
The Battle of Dettingen in 1743, which Webb participated in

Daniel Webb (c. 1700 – 11 November 1773) was a British Army general. He is best known for his actions during the French and Indian War.

== Biography ==
At the age of twenty, Webb purchased a commission in the British Army at the rank of ensign on 20 March 1720. In 1742, Webb was promoted to the rank of major while serving in the 8th Regiment of Horse, and he fought at the battle of Dettingen on 27 June 1743. Three years later in April 1745, Webb was again promoted to the rank of lieutenant colonel and on 11 May of that year fought at the battle of Fontenoy. In 1755, he was made colonel of the 48th Regiment of Foot. After the outbreak of the French and Indian War in 1754, Webb sailed to North America as a subordinate of Lord Loudoun.

He participated in British military operations around Lake George in 1757, which culminated in the siege of Fort William Henry. Believing a French prisoner's report that besieging forces under the command of Louis-Joseph de Montcalm were 11,000-men strong, Webb refused to send any of his approximately 1,600 troops north to relieve the British garrison at Fort William Henry, since Webb's men were all that stood between the French and Albany, New York. He was subsequently recalled due to his actions; British Indian Department official William Johnson later wrote that Webb was "the only Englishman [I] ever knew who was a coward".

In 1759, he was promoted to the rank of major-general and again to the rank of lieutenant-general in 1761. Five years later in 1766, he was made colonel of the 8th (The King's) Regiment of Foot. Webb was appointed as colonel of the 14th Regiment of Dragoons in 1772, holding the office until he died on 11 November 1773. His daughter and heiress, Mary, married Henry Theophilus Clements on 2 June 1770. In American writer James Fenimore Cooper's 1826 novel The Last of the Mohicans, Webb is portrayed as a minor character most noteworthy for declining to send adequate support to Fort William Henry. In the 1992 film adaptation of the novel, he is portrayed by Mac Andrews.

== Notes ==
Military offices
Preceded by Thomas Dunbar	Colonel of the 48th Regiment of Foot; 1755–1766	Succeeded by William Browne
Preceded by John Stanwix	Colonel of the 8th (The King's) Regiment of Foot; 1766–1772	Succeeded by Bigoe Armstrong
Preceded by Charles FitzRoy	Colonel of the 14th Regiment of Dragoons; 1772 – 11 November 1773	Succeeded by George Warde
