= Montreal campaign =

1760 British offensive in New France

- Part of the French and Indian War
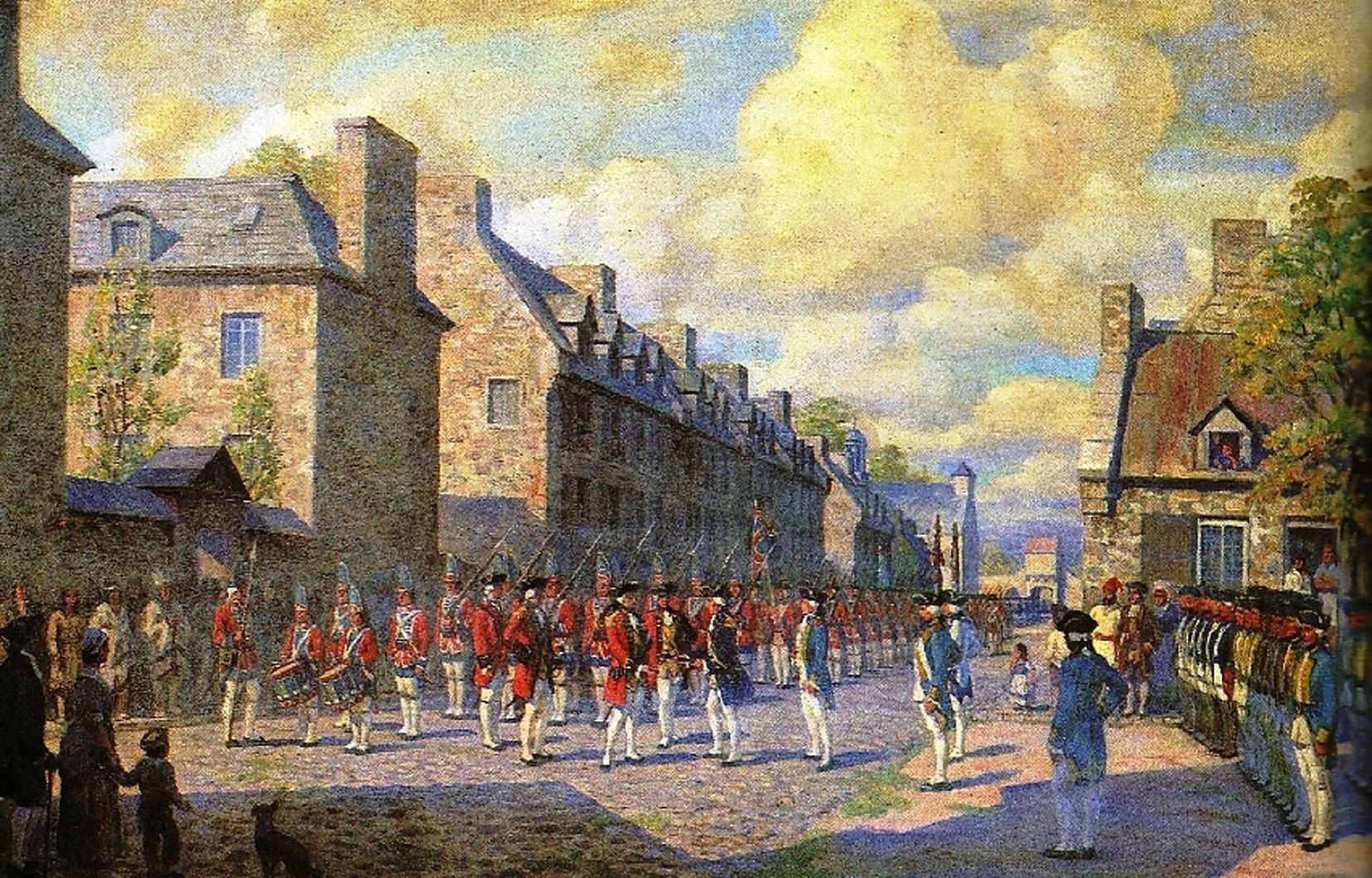
- Surrender of the French Army in Montreal in 1760
Date	July 2 – September 8, 1760 (2 months and 6 days)
Location	Saint Lawrence and Richelieu Rivers, Montreal, 45°30′32″N 73°33′42″W
Result	British victory: Surrender of Montreal; Conquest of New France

Belligerents
Great Britain: America; Indian Allies	France: (New France) Canada; Indian Allies

Commanders and leaders
(Kingdom of Great Britain) Jeffery Amherst (Kingdom of Great Britain) James Murray (Kingdom of Great Britain) William Haviland; Robert Rogers	(Kingdom of France) François Gaston de Lévis (surrendered) (New France) Marquis de Vaudreuil (surrendered) (New France) François-Charles de Bourlamaque

Strength
11,000 regulars, 6,500 provincials, 700 Iroquois	3,200 regulars and Marines, Unknown militia, unknown natives

Casualties and losses
Light	2,200 surrendered, 1,000 sick or missing. Militia and natives pacified

The Montreal campaign, also known as the fall of Montreal, was a British three-pronged offensive against Montreal which took place from July 2 to 8 September 1760 during the French and Indian War as part of the global Seven Years' War. The campaign, pitted against an outnumbered and outsupplied French army, led to the capitulation and occupation of Montreal, the largest remaining city in French Canada.

Under the overall direction of Jeffery Amherst, British forces numbering around 18,000 men converged on Montreal starting in July from three separate directions. One under Amherst moved in from Lake Ontario, the other under James Murray moved from Québec and the third under William Haviland moved from Fort Crown Point. After capturing French positions and outposts along the way all three forces met up and surrounded Montreal. Many Canadiens deserted or surrendered their arms to British forces while the native allies of the French began to negotiate peace treaties and alliances with the British.

The French military commander in the region, François Gaston de Lévis, was resolved to make a last stand in the city despite the overwhelming numerical inferiority of his troops. He was however overruled by Pierre de Rigaud, the civilian Governor of French Canada who persuaded him to surrender. Lévis attempted to negotiate a surrender with the honours of war, but the British rejected such terms and the French authorities eventually agreed to an unconditional surrender on 8 September. This effectively completed the British capture of New France.

== Background ==
Following the fall of Quebec in 1759 French forces had retreated westwards. During the winter British forces under James Murray held Quebec but due to the frozen Saint Lawrence River they had to wait until the spring of 1760 until reinforcements and supplies came down. In April François Gaston de Lévis attempted to recapture Québec by launching a surprise assault. After winning the Battle of Sainte-Foy they then laid siege to the city and awaited French reinforcements. The siege lasted from 29 April until 15 May but it was British ships that arrived to relieve the garrison and this compelled Lévis to break off the siege and retreat.

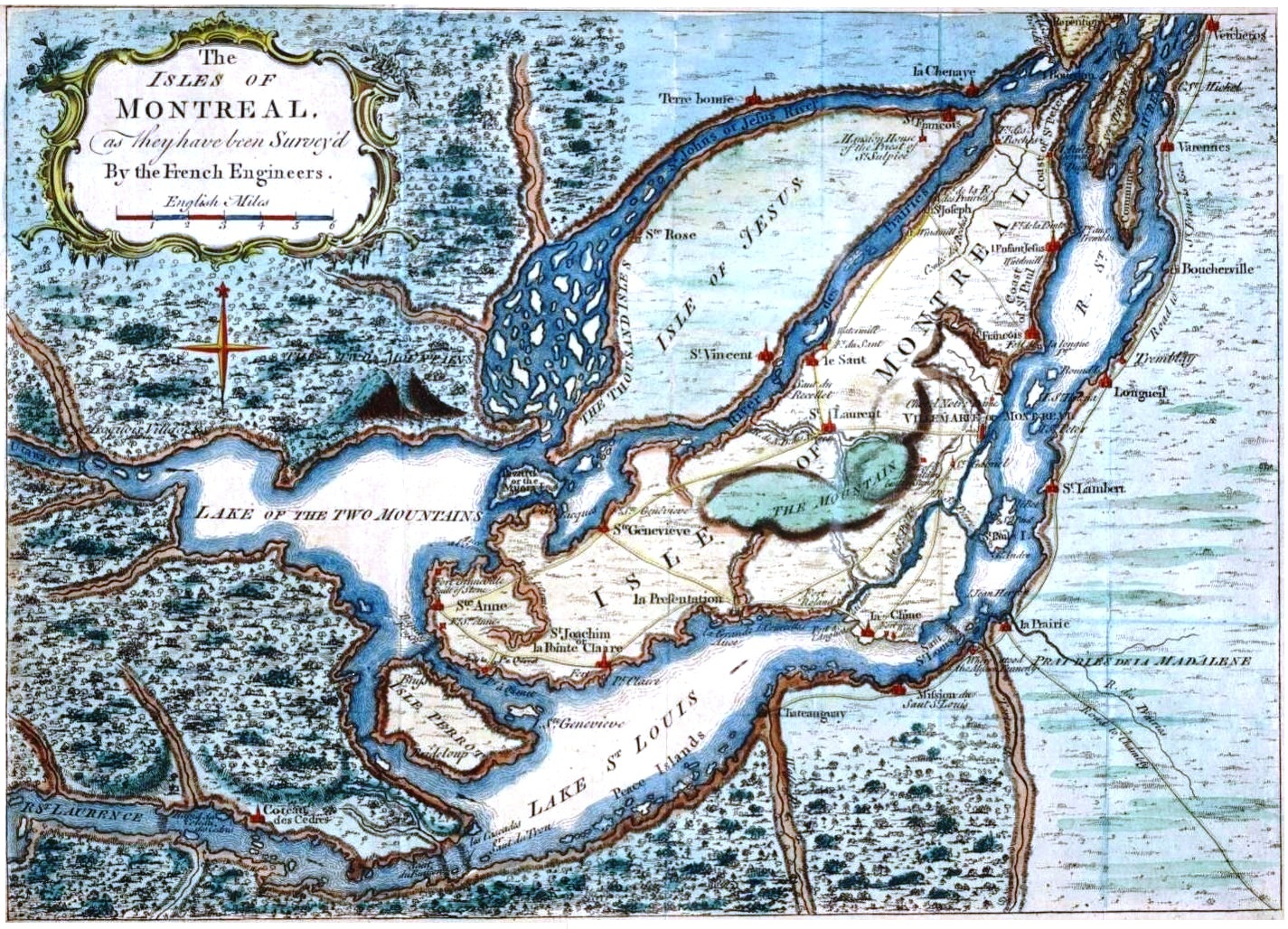
A map of the Hochelaga Archipelago as surveyed by French engineers in 1761

After his defeat, Lévis arrived at Montréal where he conferred with the Governor Marquis de Vaudreuil on future operations. Both exerted themselves for the defence of their colony that would see honour fulfilled despite the odds. Lévis was optimistic when he received news from a French fleet who had sailed from France for Québec on April 15. He soon learned however that this fleet had been intercepted by a Royal Navy blockading squadron off France with a number of ships captured along with the loss of some 500 soldiers. A few ships did get through and proceeded up the Saint Lawrence where they had taken shelter in the Restigouche River by the end of May. They were unable to leave due to the Royal Naval blockade of the Saint Lawrence and so the trapped French ships were then defeated in the Battle of Restigouche in July.

British commanders were eager to bring the campaign to a close as soon as possible. With Murray's forces substantially increased in Québec, the city thus became a staging point for the conquest of the remainder of French Canada. The British then set out a strategy for capturing Montreal, the last major French stronghold, where they would not be able to retreat deeper into the North American continent except for maintained posts in the backcountry. For this British armies would all come under commander-in-chief Jeffery Amherst. He intended to marshal his numerous forces to seek a decisive victory at Montreal.

=== Prelude ===
In the winter of 1759–60, a British force had moved from Albany to Lake Ontario and had met up with William Johnson's force that had captured Niagara the previous year. They established a base of operations on Lake Ontario at Oswego and constructed a small fleet which consisted of snows HMS Onondaga, Mohawk and several row-galleys and gunboats, with a view of transporting an army down the Saint Lawrence River to Montréal. At the same time the British were fighting the Anglo-Cherokee War which had broken out earlier in the year in the Carolinas, and after a desperate appeal by Governor William Lyttelton Amherst was able to spare 1,373 troops but no more.

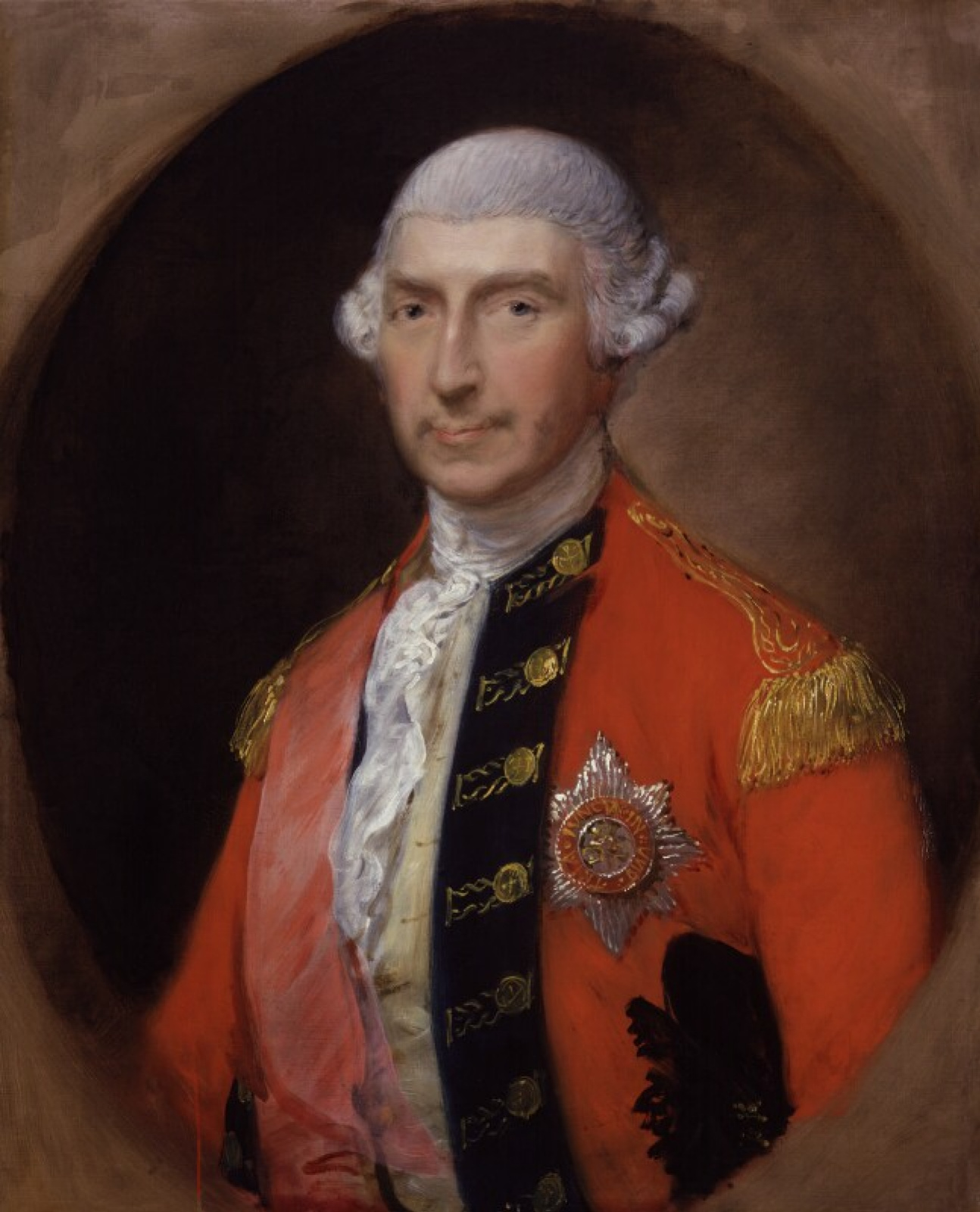
Portrait of Jeffery Amherst by Thomas Gainsborough, 1780. Amherst commanded the British forces during the campaign.

Three forces would set out: Amherst's would advance Eastward from Lake Ontario along the Saint Lawrence River aiming to cut off the retreat of the French army westward to Détroit where it would have to protract the war longer. His force numbered just over 10,000 men of which just under 4,000 were regulars, consisting of men from the 42nd, 44th, 46th and 55th regiments of foot. The rest were provincials and natives. His was not only the longest but also the most difficult and dangerous, owing to the rapids on the Saint Lawrence. William Haviland's force of two battalions of regular infantry and provincials numbering 3,500 men included the 17th, 22nd, 27th, 40th and the 60th regiments of foot as well as Robert Rogers' famed Rangers. They would advance from upper New York through Lake Champlain via the Richelieu River. This prong would likely come up against the fiercest of the French resistance in terms of defences and fortifications along the way. James Murray would lead the third prong of 4,000 men consisting of the 15th, 28th, 35th, 43rd, 47th, 48th, 58th, 60th and the 78th (Highland) regiments of foot. In addition there were Moses Hazen's Rangers and a number of natives who would scout ahead. They would advance from Quebec westwards along the Saint Lawrence and would approach the Island of Montreal from the east. All three would converge on Montreal in a pincer movement before winter set in. In total Amherst had at his disposal some 18,000 men who about 60 percent (fewer than 11,000) were regulars; the remainder included more than 6,500 provincial soldiers, drawn from every colony north of Pennsylvania, and more than 700 Iroquois warriors.

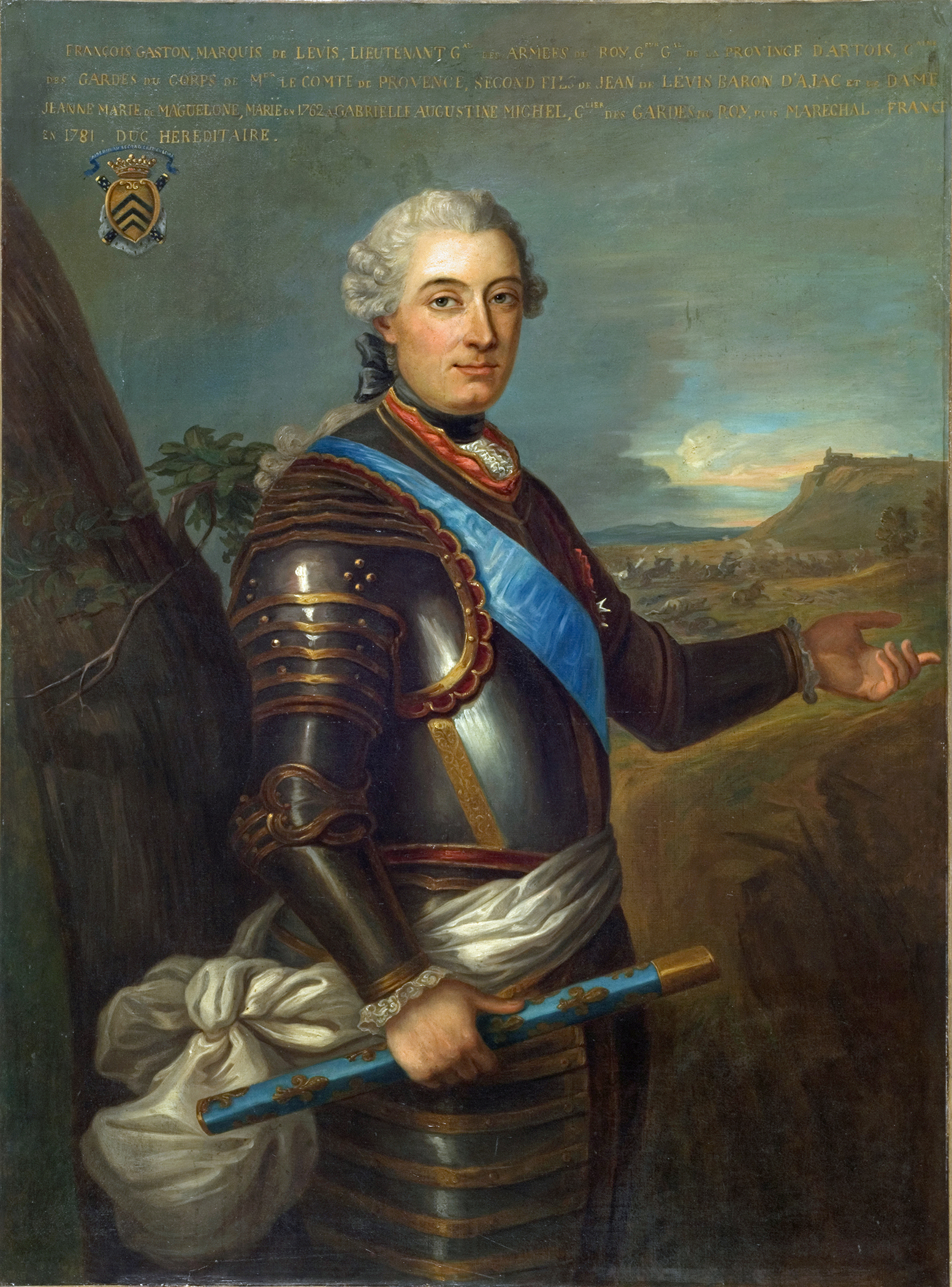
François Gaston de Lévis - military commander of New France

Amherst ordered Robert Rogers, his Rangers and a few Mohicans on a spoiling attack on French supplies at Forts Chambly, Saint-Jean in the hope that this would weaken French forces and help divert manpower against Murray's advance. The raid which began on 3 June lasted nearly three weeks; departing from Crown Point Rogers learned that the forts were too strong for an assault as they had been reinforced. Nevertheless, they surprised and took the main supply depot at Sainte-Thérèse and had it burned to the ground. On their return journey the British and Mohawks then repelled French ambushes before arriving back to Crown Point to give Amherst the details of the raid. He was delighted with the result and praised Rogers – the British took over 100 soldiers and militia captive, burned or captured valuable supplies and gained vast knowledge on the French defensive works up to Montreal. The raid proved a shock to the inhabitants forcing some militia to desert and many natives to abandon their cause for France. Lévis attempted to raise morale but this had little effect.

Lévis used every available resources for the defence of Montreal; he had a total of eight battalions numbering 3,200 regulars. Lévis could not rely much on his French-allied natives – many were deserting the French cause and some tribes even wanted peace with the British. There was a population of 82,000 and upwards of 20,000 men able to bear arms but most of these were disheartened with the recent defeats and many were ready to surrender their arms to the advancing British. Of the regulars these were composed of the regiments of La Reine, la Sarre, Royal Roussillon, Languedoc, Guyenne, Berry, Béarn and the Compagnies Franches de la Marine. Lévis ordered Captain Pierre Pouchot of the Régiment de Béarn to delay Amherst's approaching army for as long as he could. Pouchot set up his defence of the area at Fort Lévis where he had a garrison of 340 regulars and Canadian militiamen as well as natives. Furthermore, a force under the Chevalier de La Corne was ready to defend the rapids above Montréal, should the British attempt that dangerous passage. The principal French posts barring the lines of Haviland's advance along the Richelieu River were Forts Chambly, Saint-Jean and Île aux Noix. After Roger's attack, these were further reinforced by Louis Antoine de Bougainville which came to some 3,000 regulars, Canadians and natives. In order to prevent Murray from moving upstream from Quebec Lévis ordered Captain Jean-Daniel Dumas to watch the Saint Lawrence with his force of some 1,800 men in addition to several small armed vessels. He had occupied posts at Fort Jacques-Cartier, Deschambault, Trois-Rivières, Sorel on the eastern side of Montréal, Varennes and Pointe-aux-Trembles.

== Campaign ==
=== Murray's advance ===
James Murray's prong of 4,000 men set out from Quebec was the first to set out on July 13. 2,000 men would march along the bank whilst the rest were embarked on a fleet of armed vessels and bateau which contained heavy guns and supplies from the Royal Navy in case a protracted siege came about – his advance was the second longest of the three. Facing the British was a series of French defensive positions along the Saint Lawrence; two on the North shore and one on the South shore. Out of all the advances Murray's went through the most populated areas of Canadians, so he therefore had to conduct a counterinsurgency campaign and pacify the population.

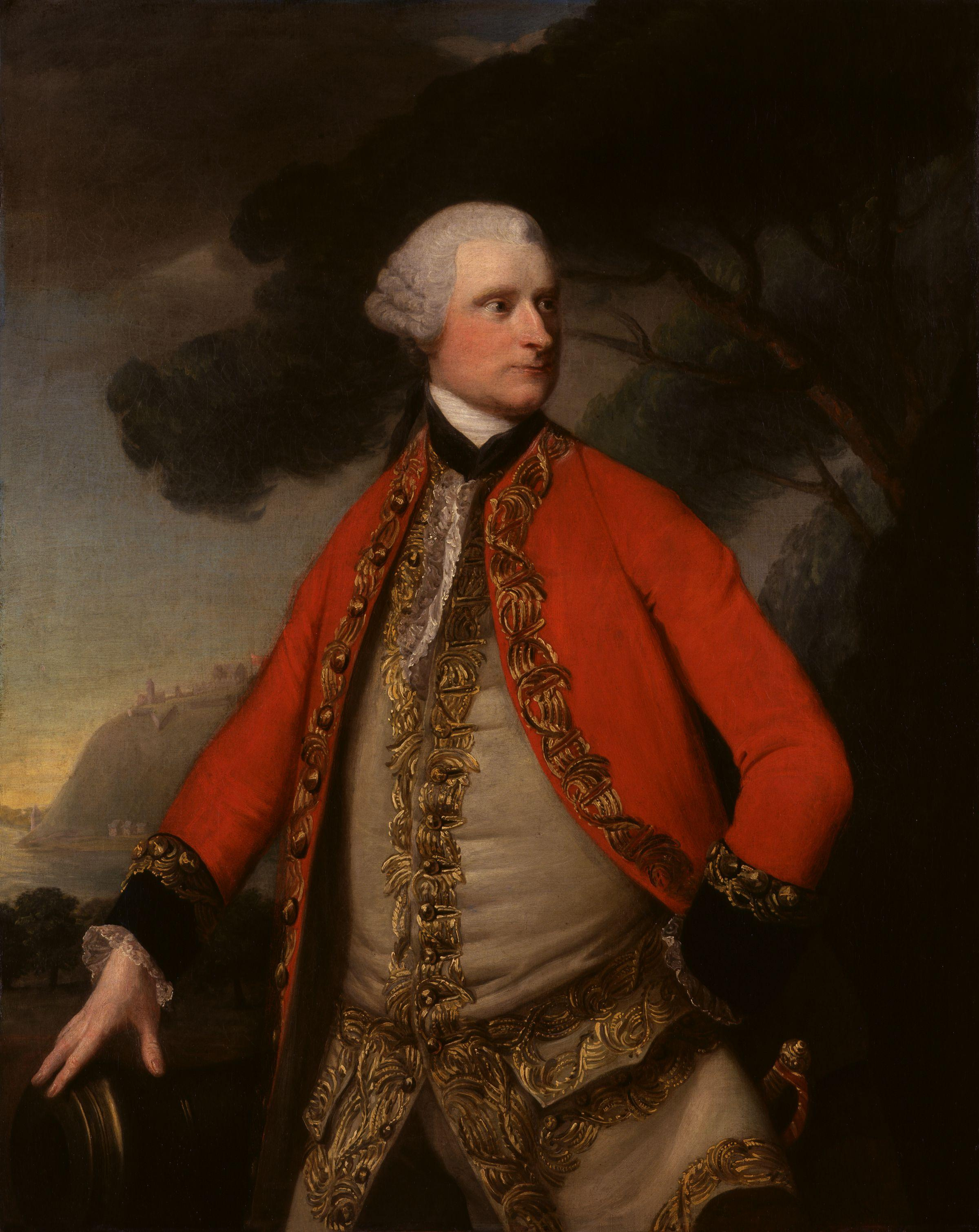
James Murray – his advance was a successful pacifying campaign that won over the French Canadians

On the slow journey upriver to Montreal, Murray's flotilla was harassed by French soldiers but did little to delay his advance. His flotilla engaged French defences at Deschambault following which they seized Grondines in which they dispersed a force of sixty French regulars. Despite this the Canadian population there took Murray's oath, surrendered their arms and exchanges were given. Sainte-Croix followed next and as he advanced further and further Murray was able to pacify the French Canadians and made sure that they swore loyalty to King George II. This was an unqualified success made easier by Murray being able to speak French along with exploiting the failed economy by distributing gold and silver coins. What is more the French military had spread false propaganda - Vaudreuil had warned Canadian inhabitants of cruel unjust treatment by the English but this actually worked against them since it was the French who threatened repercussions if they did not resist the British.

Murray delayed by winds finally reached the French defences at Trois-Rivières by mid August but was able to bypass them much to the annoyance of Dumas who realised that he was by now unable to stop them. Nevertheless, he sent his men to the Northern shore downstream to lay opposite a French force under François-Charles de Bourlamaque in order to fall upon Murray. Hazen's Rangers found the French entrenched along the shore near Sorel on August 21. Murray reluctantly launched an attack under the cover of darkness in two columns of 300 men consisting the Grenadiers and the light companies. The French were dispersed from their defences and the town was put to the torch, but despite Murray's concerns the Canadians threw down their arms and abandoned the French cause. Bourlamaque was furious and wrote to Lévis stating that his troops were deserting him in large numbers.

By August 26 Murray's force was less than 10 km (6.2 mi) from the city and dropped anchor the following day downriver from Montreal. Before he could advance any further eight Sachems of various tribes including the Huron wished to establish peace with Great Britain. Murray however was not empowered to grant any formal treaty or peace to the natives since he was subordinate to Amherst and that would be up to him once the conquest of Montreal and New France was complete. Nevertheless, Murray discussed in length and issued a pass protecting their rights.

The last place of significant defence was at Varennes - Murray sent ahead a detachment of Rangers as well as four companies of grenadiers and light infantry which landed there on 31 August. A French unit consisting of sixty regulars and 320 militia opened fire but the British drove them back. Rocket flares were sent up and this signalled the rest of the British led by Murray to join. After a short firefight the town was secure, a French counterattack was then repelled by the Rangers. Eight of the defenders were killed or wounded with another forty taken prisoner – the British had trifling loses. Varrenes and the surrounding area was then plundered and burned by British troops but despite this it was submitted to Murray. Lévis was kept informed and ordered troops to fall back to Montreal. Over the next few days Murray's Corps had extended along the south bank of the Saint Lawrence and moved up to Sainte-Thérèse, just below Montréal. In that time some four thousand Canadians were disarmed and took the oath of the King. Murray's Corps then encamped and waited for Haviland and Amherst to appear. Murray had made a remarkable achievement; he succeeded in his advance disarming the inhabitants of the riverside parishes and had caused the vast majority of the Canadian militiamen able to bear arms to desert in their thousands on which the French depended for resistance.

=== Amherst's advance ===
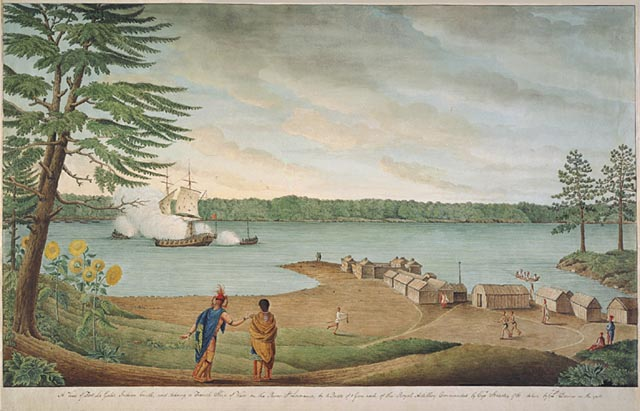
British Gunboats capture French corvette l'Outaouaise during the Battle of the Thousand Islands

Amherst's force set out from Oswego on August 10, accompanying them were William Johnson and George Croghan along with 700 Natives (Stockbridge Indians). Captain Joshua Loring, who commanded HMS Onondaga and HMS Mohawk, had been sent ahead of Amherst's force as an advance guard. Just over a week later his naval vessels reached Fort Lévis to bombard the island - guns were landed on nearby shorelines and islands to enfilade the fort. They captured the French corvette l'Outaouaise which was then used on its former owners. For three days both sides bombarded each other as the British ships either ran aground or were sunk. By August 24 however, Pouchot was out of ammunition and surrendered to Amherst. Most of the Natives wanted to enter Fort Levis to plunder a few scalps. Amherst refused to allow it, and despite Johnson's warnings most went home, leaving around 170 to continue the advance.

In the meantime Johnson and Croghan were instrumental in turning the French allied natives - representatives from different nations came to negotiate with Johnson near Fort Lévis. Although Amherst was arrogant and dismissive of the natives, they agreed on a treaty with Johnson whereby they would remain neutral in return for a guarantee of future friendship. Lévis meanwhile had a made a desperate last-ditch appeal for help from his native allies at a conference of his own at La Prairie but this was interrupted when the natives left. Around 800 French allied warriors were disarmed by Johnson, and what's more, around a hundred of them actively joined forces with the British taking French prisoners to provide intelligence.

On August 31, Amherst left Fort Lévis after having left a British garrison behind, renaming it Fort William Augustus and advanced downstream on the Saint Lawrence. With the disarmament of the natives, the only worry for Amherst now was the descent of the Saint Lawrence rapids and so the flotilla was compelled to proceed in single file. A succession of rapids known as 'The Galops', the 'Rapide Plat', the 'Long Sault', the 'Côteau du Lac' were passed in succession, with little loss. At the same time the Chevalier de La Corne informed Lévis that Fort Lévis had been taken and that Amherst had reached a position within one day from Montréal.

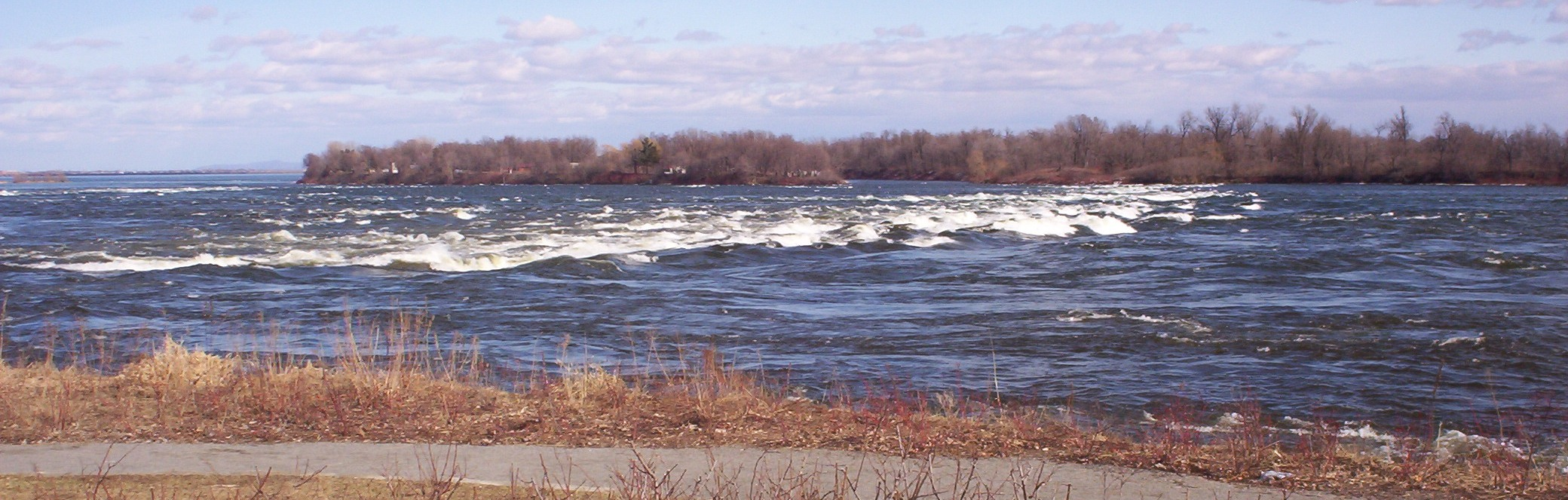
The Lachine rapids

On September 4, the flotilla reached the most dangerous part of the river as they came across the rapids: 'Les Cèdres', the 'Buisson', and the 'Cascades', where the surges were strongest. The trip was hazardous to many in spite of the Mohawk river men who guided them through the swirling water. Many boats were wrecked, overturned and a few even collided - scores of men were swept under and drowned. They soon however emerged into Lake Saint-Louis and landed at Île Perrot, about 35 km (22 mi) from Montréal. It had been costly – 46 boats (29 transporting men, seventeen of artillery and stores) and seventeen whale-boats were totally wrecked, eighteen were damaged, one row galley was grounded and overall 84 men were drowned. La Corne was unable to mount any form of defence, so Lévis then gave orders for all French troops to the west of Montréal to retire to the Island of Montréal.

Amherst spent the next day repairing his boats at Île Perrot and a day later British troops embarked again. The French mounted volunteers who were observing Amherst's force then retired from Île Perrot to Lachine, 11 km (6.8 mi) from Montréal, which they reached at the same time than the advanced elements of Amherst's Army who pursued them.

=== Haviland's advance ===
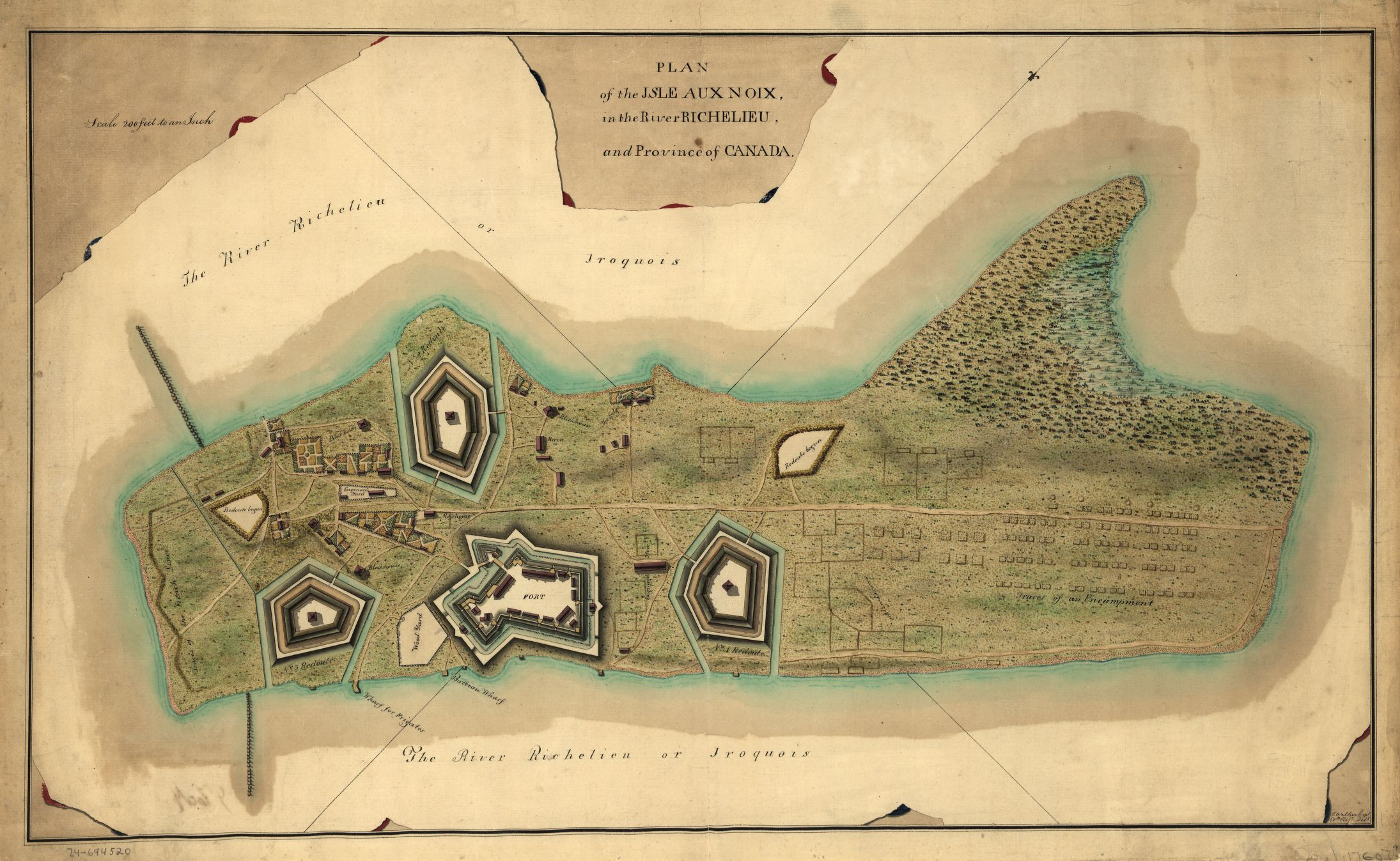
Defensive fortifications on the Île aux Noix

A day after Amherst set out, William Haviland's force of 3,500 men left Crown Point and set out along the Richelieu river. Blocking their path was the Île aux Noix a French held position under command of Louis de Bougainville. The British made a landing two km (1.2 mi) upstream from the island and tried to make their way to the east of the island downstream. This was defended by the few remaining French warships composed of the sloop La Vigilante, the schooner Waggon and several gunboats, and was anchored close to the shore. A number of forts on the island made it a considerable threat and French troops had been sent to reinforce Bougainville's force there.

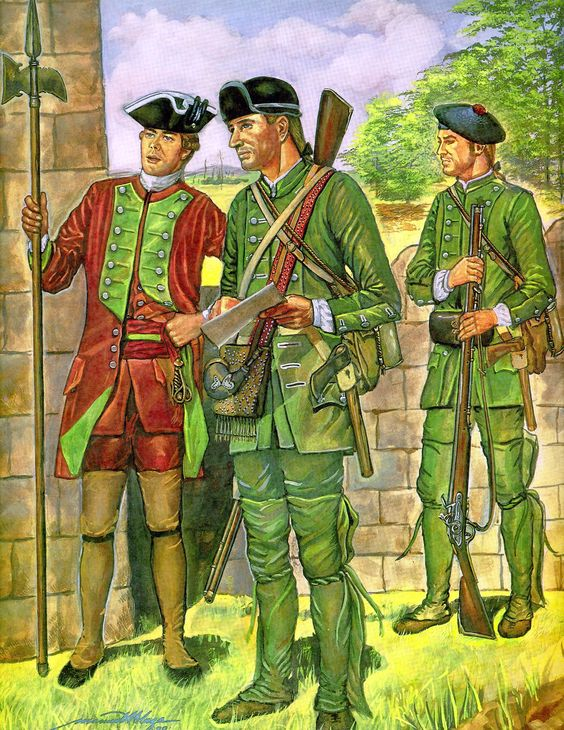
Rogers' Rangers advanced with William Haviland's force

On August 23, British batteries opened on the fortifications of Île aux Noix. Haviland meanwhile sent Colonel John Darby's two light infantry companies, Rogers' four ranger companies and a force of Indians to drag three canon through the forest and swamps further down to the rear of Bougainville's position. The French did not anticipate this as they believe it could not be done. Within a few days however the guns and the infantry made it through without being detected and planted the guns on the river-bank where the French naval force stood defending the mouth of the Richelieu River's south channel. Rogers' cannon opened up upon these vessels; the closest being the sloop Waggon cut her cable but her captain was killed and part of her crew killed or wounded. Soon the rest of the crew abandoned the sloop and a strong west wind then drove her ashore into the hands of the British. The other vessels and gunboats made all sail for Saint-Jean, but then became stranded in a bend of the river. The rangers seeing this then swam out with their tomahawks. They were able to board one of them killing or capturing the crew, and the rest soon surrendered. With the threat of the French flotilla eliminated, the British transferred some barges on to the South channel.

The following day rumours of a French withdrawal prompted the Rangers and the regulars to make an assault on the fort which was seized along with fifty French prisoners. British losses were a few men injured whilst the French had eighty men killed, wounded or drowned. Bougainville in accordance with instructions from Vaudreuil evacuated the island and headed for Fort Saint-Jean. With all their vessels seized French river communications were now severed; Haviland's force was then ferried across the bank to take Fort Saint-Jean on August 29. The French decided to abandon the fort but before they did they set fire to it leaving for Fort Chambly, the last stronghold on the river. Rogers' Rangers having arrived in whale and floatboats came across Fort St Jean's smouldering ruins the next day - and moved forward along the Montreal road and were able to capture seventeen French stragglers including a major and a captain.

A detachment from Haviland's force numbering 1,000 men including siege guns under Darby arrived to join Rogers the next day and came upon Fort Chambly. After a rejection of surrender from the 70-year-old French commander Paul-Louis Dazemard de Lusignan, British guns opened up and after a twenty-minute bombardment Lusignan surrendered along with 71 men. Bougainville ordered all French forces into Montreal but by now they were beginning to suffer heavily from desertions. With the forts and towns of the Richelieu Valley in British hands they rested for two days before they marched upon Montreal itself.

=== Montreal besieged ===
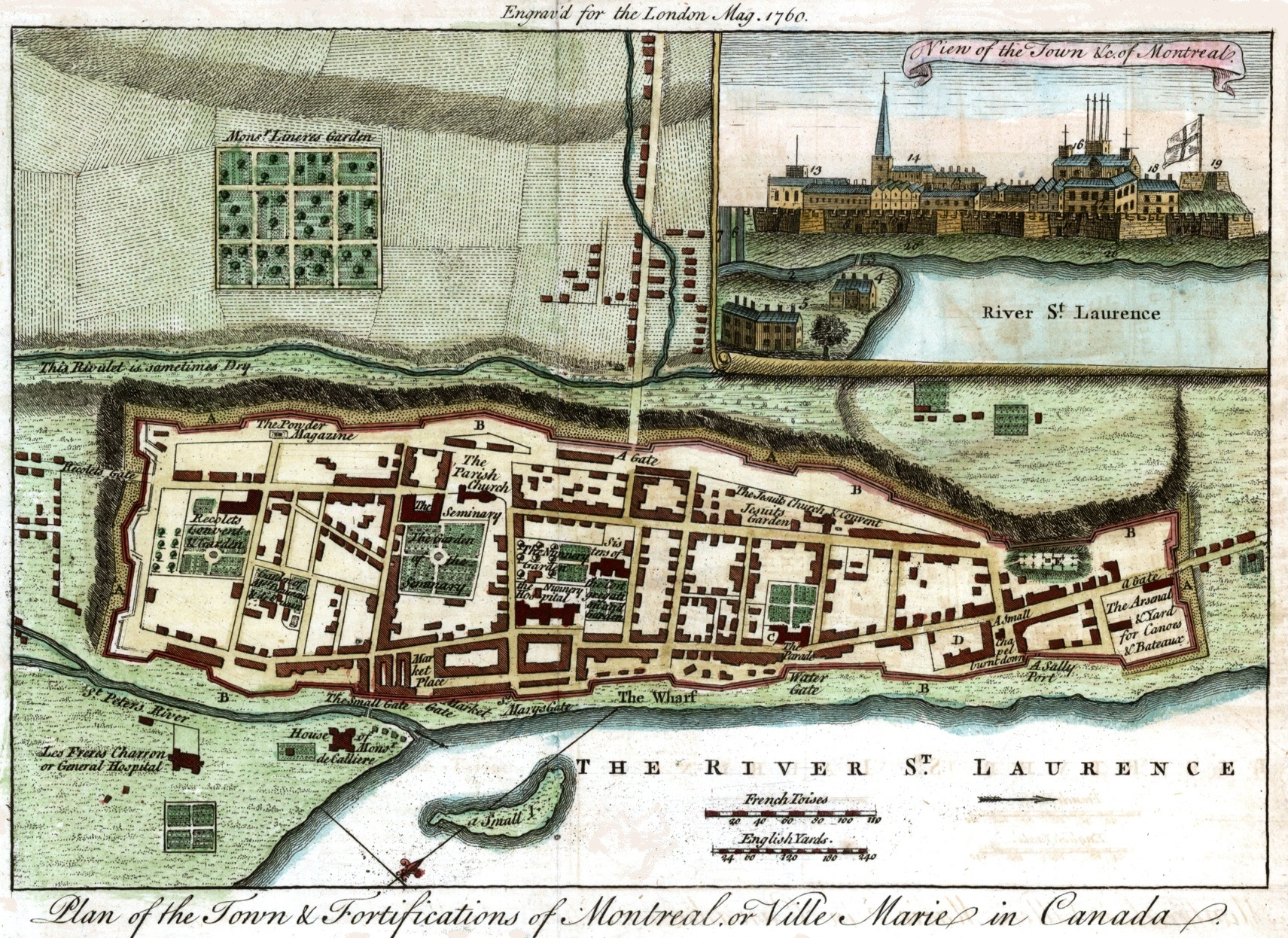
1760 Montreal and its surrounding walls

At 11 am on September 6, Amherst's army had landed unopposed at Lachine and then marched upon on Montréal – the French army retired within the walls of the town. As Amherst approached nearly all Canadians had deserted and here too nearly all the remaining force of Canada, consisting less than 2,200 regular troops and some 200 men of the Compagnies Franches de la Marine. Of the later many of these men had also deserted; and the rest were so broken in discipline that their officers were forced to use entreaties instead of commands. Some 241 men were also unfit for duty in the garrison being either wounded or sick. The town was a long, narrow assemblage of wooden or stone houses, one or two stories high, had three churches, four convents and at the lower end a high mound of earth, crowned by a redoubt, where a few cannon were mounted. The whole was surrounded by a shallow moat and a bastion stone wall, made for defence against Indians, and incapable of resisting cannon.

The following day Amherst encamped above the place on the eastern side with the main British army began bringing up his siege guns from Lachine. At 10 am, Murray's army landed at Pointe-aux-Trembles and marched to Longue-Pointe to encamp below Amherst's force. Vaudreuil, looking across the Saint Lawrence, could see the tents of the British encampment on the southern shore. The inhabitants of Montréal refused to take arms. A battalion of the Compagnies Franches de la Marine was still stationed at Saint Helen's Island while the small French naval presence only consisted of the small frigate Marie as well as the two half-galleys. The rest of the French Army had been posted along the walls of Montréal. Later in the day Haviland arrived on the southern shore against Amherst's camp which completed the junction and effectively closed the ring around the city. The combined army now encamped around the city. All three armies had arrived at Montreal at three different directions nearly within a day of each other.

The town was also now crowded with non-combatant refugees. Vaudreuil called a council of war the same day – it was resolved that since all the militia and many of the regulars had abandoned the army, and the Indian allies of France had gone over to the British, further resistance was impossible. Lévis' sent his second in command de Bougainville to ask for a suspension of arms for one month. His request was rejected, and Amherst gave the French six hours to make their final decision. Vaudreuil then laid before the assembled officers a long paper that he had been drawn up, containing 55 articles of capitulation to be proposed to the British; and these were unanimously approved.

=== Surrender ===
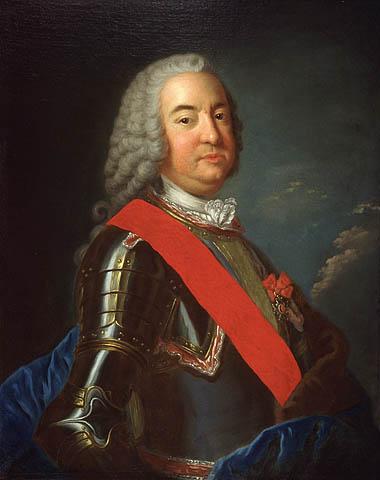
Pierre de Rigaud de Vaudreuil - the last French Governor of New France

At 10am on September 7, Bougainville carried the articles of capitulation to the tent of Amherst. He granted the greater part, modified some and flatly refused others. That which the French officers thought more important than all the rest was the provision that the troops should march out with arms, cannon and the honours of war; to which it was replied: "The whole garrison of Montréal and all other French troops in Canada must lay down their arms, and shall not serve during the present war." This demand was felt to be intolerable so Vaudreuil sent Bougainville back to remonstrate; but Amherst was inflexible. Then Lévis tried to shake his resolution, and sent him an officer with the following note: "I send your Excellency M. de la Pause, assistant quartermaster-general of the army, on the subject of the too rigorous article which you dictate to the troops by the capitulation, to which it would not be possible for us to subscribe." Amherst answered the envoy: "I am fully resolved, for the infamous part the troops of France have acted in exciting the savages to perpetrate the most horrid and unheard of barbarities in the whole progress of the war, and for other open treacheries and flagrant breaches of faith, to manifest to all the world by this capitulation my detestation of such practices;" and he dismissed La Pause with a short note, refusing to change the conditions. Eventually despite protestations which rose almost to the point of mutiny on the part of Lévis, the capitulation was to be signed.

The capitulation finally took place the following day at 8am and was signed by Amherst in a house just northwest of the walls of Montreal in what became known as 'Capitulation cottage'. By this capitulation, Canada and all its dependencies passed to the British crown. French officers, civil and military, with French troops and sailors, were to be sent to France in British ships. Free exercise of religion was assured to the people of the colony, and the religious communities were to retain their possessions, rights and privileges. All persons who might wish to retire to France were allowed to do so, and the Canadians were to remain in full enjoyment of feudal and other property, including black and Indian slaves.

In the evening, Murray's Corps advanced up to the Récollets suburbs - Lévis gave orders to his battalions to burn their colours. The following morning a British detachment of grenadiers and light infantry with some artillery led by Colonel Frederick Haldimand entered into Montréal and took position on the Place d'Armes. Here one after another, the French battalions of the regiments of La Reine, la Sarre, Royal Roussillon, Languedoc, Guyenne, Berry and Béarn totalling 2,200 men (those that were fit) deposited arms before returning to their camp on the ramparts where they were reviewed by Lévis. The British then took possession of all posts within Montréal. The following day the colours of Shirley's and Pepperell's regiment lost at Oswego in 1756 were found and were marched out of Montreal in procession along the British line. Later that day general orders were issued by Amherst which were the first public documents promulgated in the name of Great Britain after the entire conquest of Canada.

== Aftermath ==
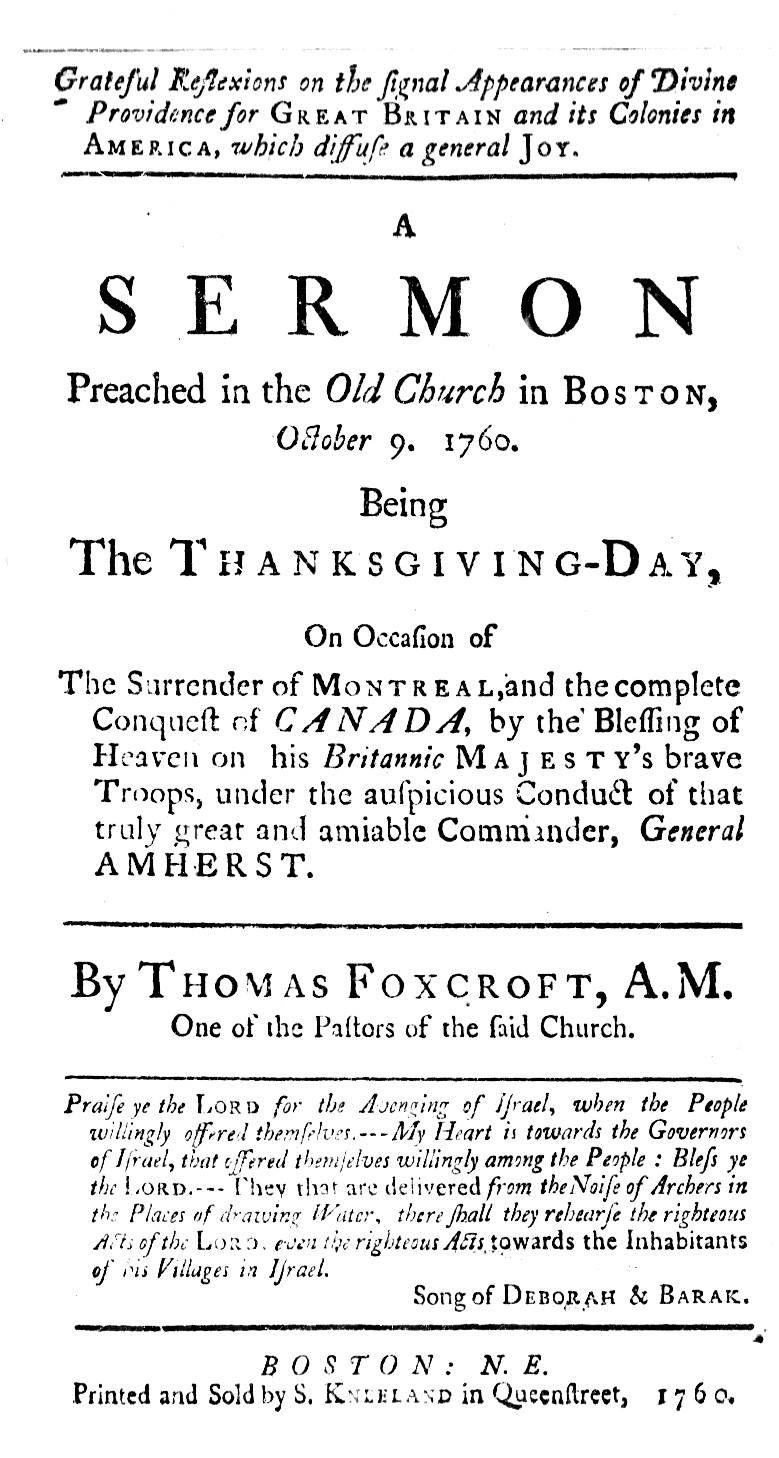
'Grateful Reflexions on the Signal Appearances of Divine Providence for Great Britain and its Colonies in America. 1760'

The victory at Montreal was the culmination of the British offensive against Canada and the British had effectively won the war. Amherst had orders to consider a further assault on the French in Louisiana, but he decided against this. The last campaign of note was the British advance to Michigan at Fort Detroit late in November. Rogers' Rangers detached himself from Haviland and were able to seize the fort; a ship of war, 33 pieces of cannon, many stores, the military chest, 2,500 troops and one stand of colours.

Amherst rewarded the natives that followed him to Montreal with silver medals for their 'faithfulness to the English standard'. With the defeat of the French, their own Indian allies made a treaty of peace with the British, known as the Treaty of Kahnawake in October. By this the Natives negotiated free access between Canada and New York, to maintain their important fur trade between Montreal and Albany.

Throughout the month of October, French prisoners were sent to Quebec and then British vessels eventually transported them to France. At the same time British provincials were sent back home while measures were taken to garrison Montréal for the winter. By October 22, all French soldiers had left except for those few that wished to stay and swore allegiance to the King. Lévis returned to France on parole arriving in Paris in December, and was released for service in Europe by William Pitt. He served in the German campaigns of 1762 notably at the Battle of Nauheim, and retired from active military service with the wars end in 1763.

The news of Montreal's capture was met with joy in Great Britain – the London Magazine of 1760 included the lyrics to A Song on the Taking of Montreal in which Amherst was given hero status. The press vaunted his success and portrayed him as a bringer of peace and harmony. This idealism was turned into propaganda when the artist Francis Hayman was ordered by Jonathan Tyers to commission a series of artworks. "The Surrender of Montreal" which was exhibited in the Music Hall rotunda and annex of Vauxhall Gardens in 1761 with the words chiselled in Power exerted, conquest obtained, mercy shown.

The ongoing Anglo-Cherokee War ended with the defeat of the Cherokees in July the following year with a negotiated treaty. The details of the Conquest, however, still had to be sorted out between England and France. As they had at Quebec, the British offered generous terms in regard to the French Canadians which were later to become enshrined by law in the Proclamation of 1763 and the Quebec Act. In line with the Old World's "rules of war", Britain assured the 60,000 to 70,000 francophone inhabitants freedom from deportation and from confiscation of property, freedom of religion, the right to migrate to France and equal treatment in the fur trade.

With the war in North America effectively over the battleground switched to the Caribbean the following year. Spain joined the war on the side of France but were quickly defeated after losing Havana and Manila to British expeditions. The war in Europe fared no better for the Bourbon allies; the Spanish invasion of Portugal failed with heavy losses, and French forces were unable to take the initiative fighting the Duke of Brunswick's Anglo-German forces.

The loss of Montreal proved a devastating blow to France's hopes of regaining Canada at a future peace congress. The French government had believed that if it could keep a toe-hold in Canada, it would be able to negotiate the return of captured Canadian territory by exchanging it for territory occupied by French troops in Europe. This proved more complicated for France with the British seizure of the French Caribbean islands including Martinique and Dominica. By the wars end it became widely accepted by diplomats of both countries that New France would be ceded to the British. The Treaty of Paris of 1763 recognised the transfer of sovereignty to Great Britain.

Thomas Gage was appointed the first British Governor of Montreal. Along with other British officials he retained much of the previous French system of government.

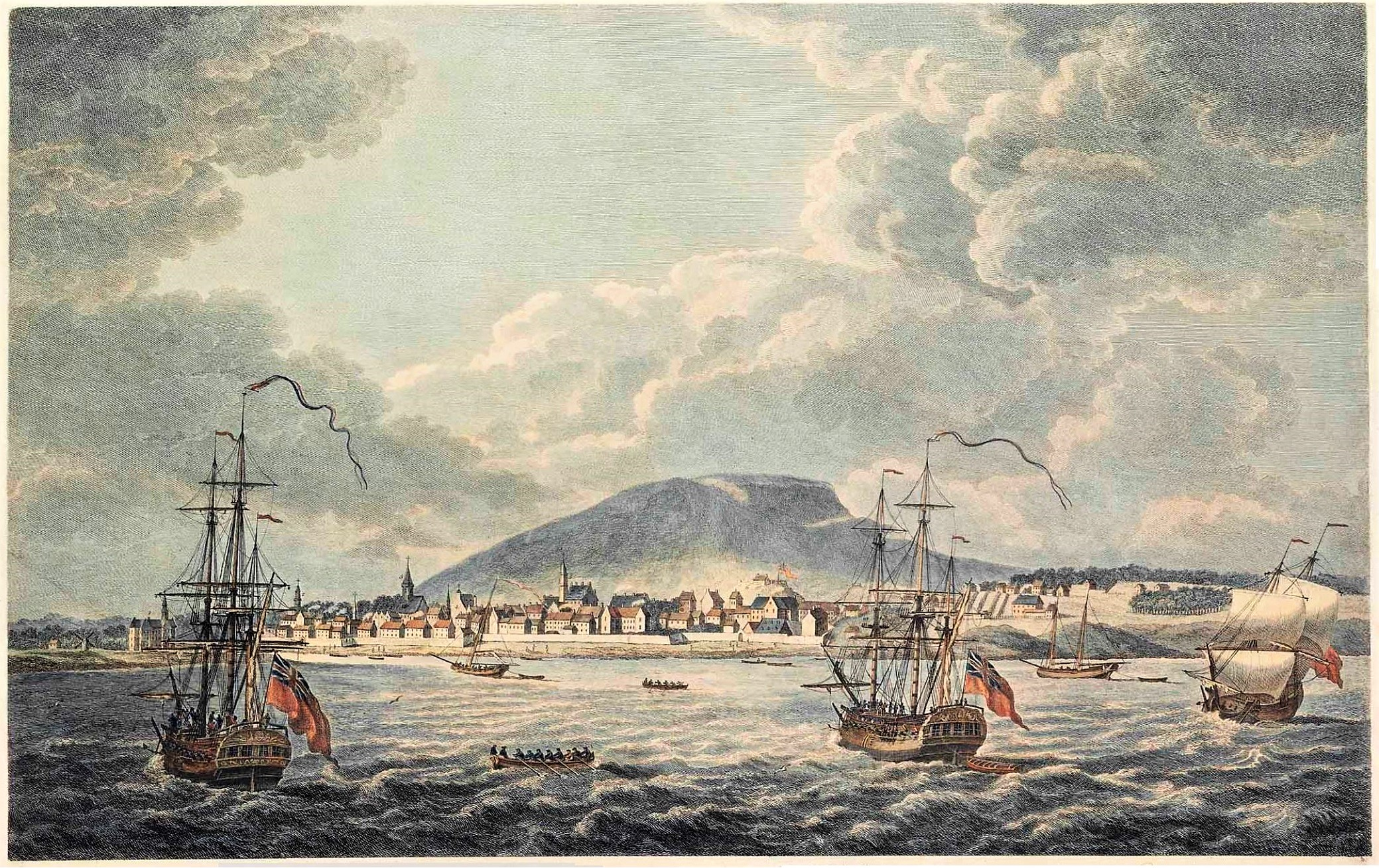
Montreal occupied, viewed from the East with Royal Navy vessels in foreground

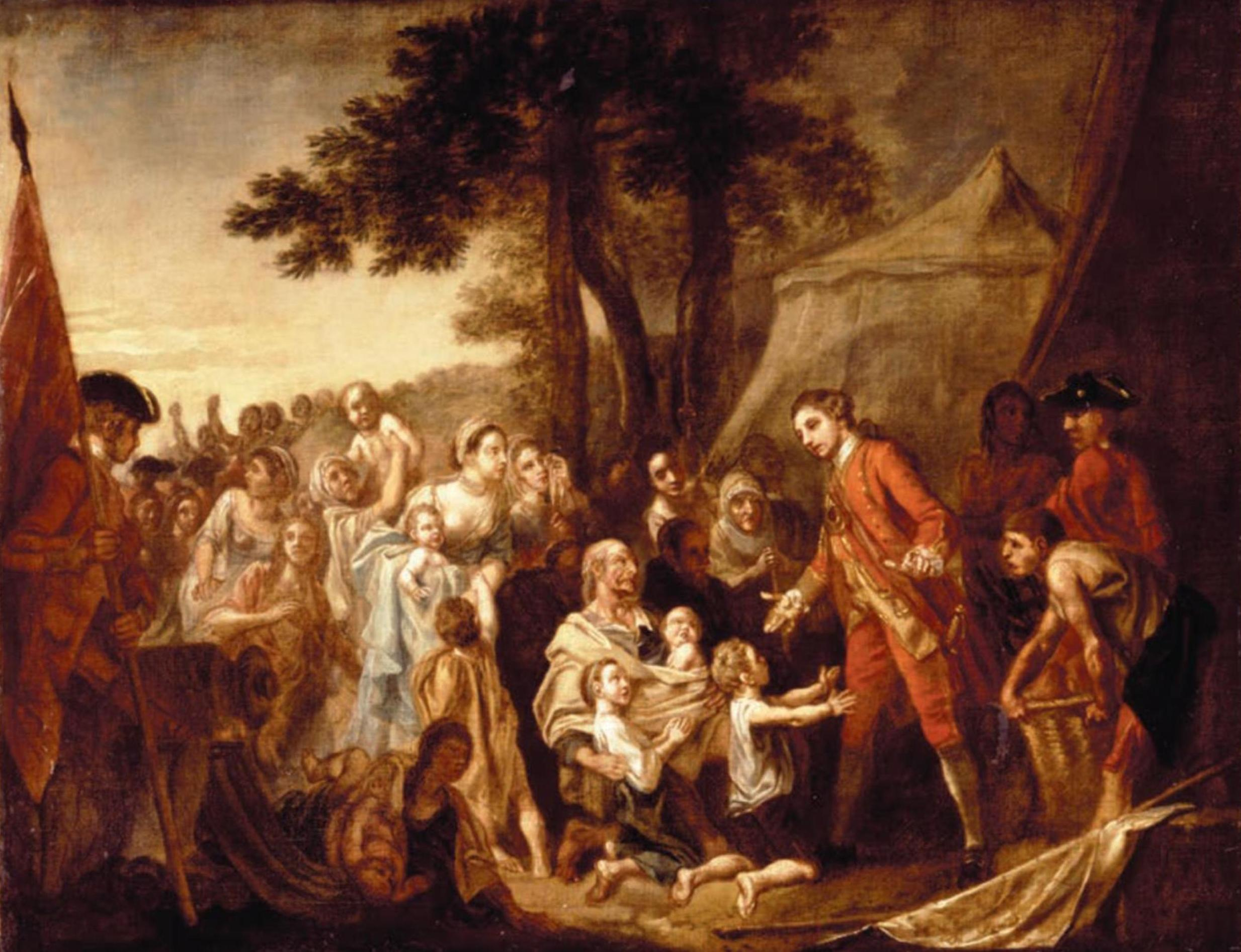
Surrender of Montreal to General Amherst by Francis Hayman

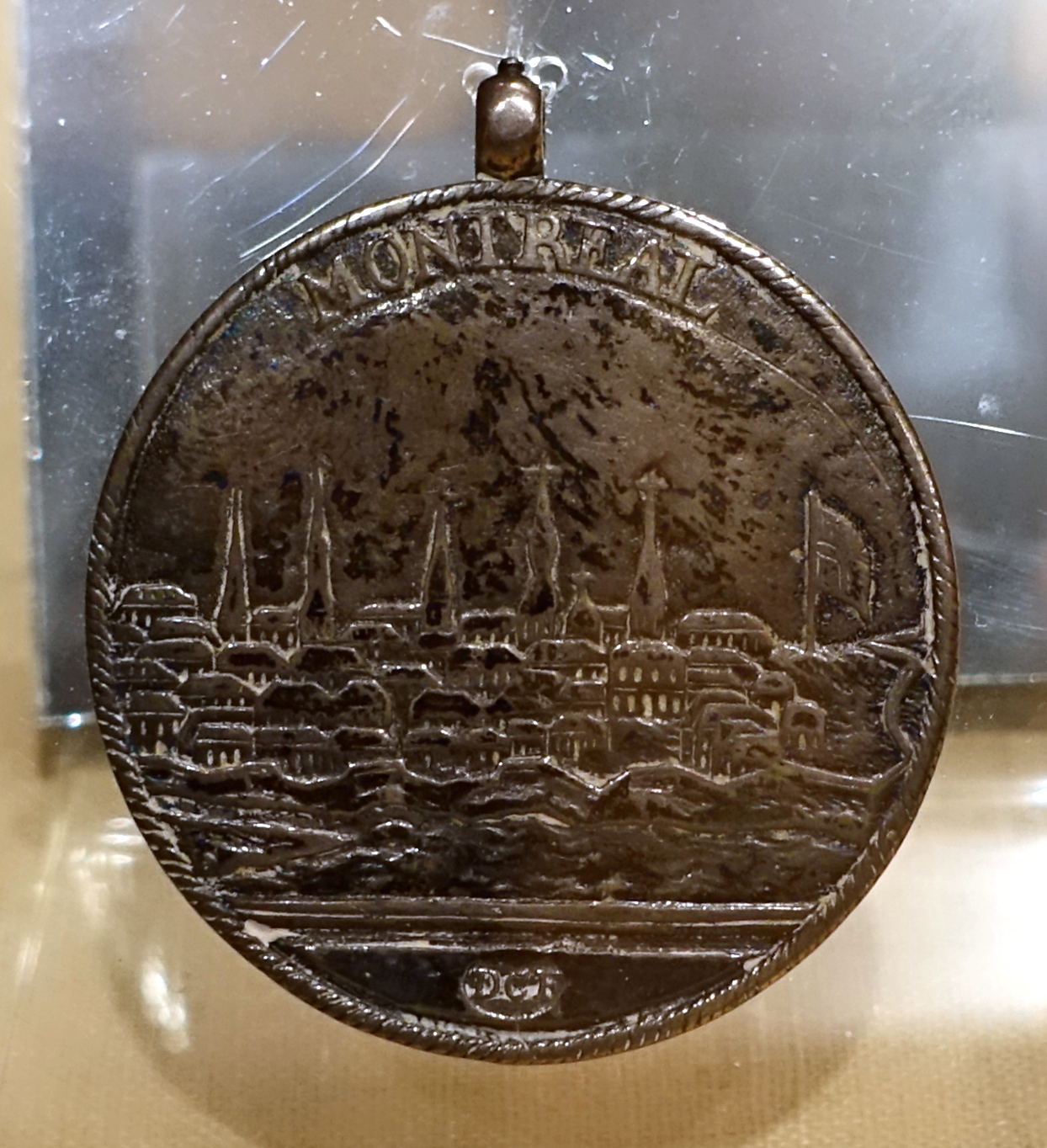
Medal bestowed on a Native American chief for the 'storming of Montreal by the British in 1760'

== Bibliography ==
- Anderson, Fred (2007). Crucible of War: The Seven Years' War and the Fate of Empire in British North America, 1754–1766. Knopf Doubleday Publishing Group. ISBN 9780307425393.
- Calloway, Colin G (2007). The Scratch of a Pen: 1763 and the Transformation of North America Pivotal moments in American history. Oxford University Press. ISBN 9780195331271.
- Carrier, Roch (2014). Montcalm And Wolfe: Two Men Who Forever Changed the Course of Canadian History. Harper Collins. ISBN 9781443428637.
- Chartrand, René (2008). The Forts of New France in Northeast America 1600–1763. Oxford, UK: Osprey Publishing. ISBN 978-1-846-03255-4.
- Chet, Guy (2003). Conquering the American Wilderness: The Triumph of European Warfare in Colonial Northeast. Univ of Massachusetts Press. ISBN 9781558493827.
- Cubbison, Douglas R (2014). All Canada in the Hands of the British: General Jeffery Amherst and the 1760 Campaign to Conquer New France Volume 43 of Campaigns and Commanders Series. University of Oklahoma Press. ISBN 9780806145310.
- Dale, Ronald J (2004). The Fall of New France: How the French Lost a North American Empire 1754–1763. James Lorimer & Company. ISBN 9781550288407.
- Danley, Mark & Speelman, Patrick (2012). The Seven Years' War: Global Views History of Warfare. Brill. ISBN 9789004236448.
- De Bolla, Peter (2003). The Education of the Eye: Painting, Landscape, and Architecture in Eighteenth-century Britain. Stanford University Press. ISBN 9780804748001.
- Dull, Jonathan R (2007). The French Navy and the Seven Years' War France Overseas: Studies in Empire and Decolonization France overseas. U of Nebraska Press. ISBN 9780803260245.
- Dunmore, John (2005). Storms and Dreams: Louis de Bougainville : Soldier, Explorer, Statesman. Exisle Publishing. ISBN 9780908988570.
- Edgar, Walter B, ed. (2006). The South Carolina Encyclopedia Editor. University of South Carolina Press. ISBN 9781570035982.
- Fougères, Dany & MacLeod, Roderick, eds. (2018). The History of a North American City. McGill-Queen's Press – MQUP. ISBN 9780773552692.
- Gallup, Andrew & Shaffer, Donald F (1992). La Marine: The French Colonial Soldier in Canada, 1745–1761. Heritage Books. ISBN 9781556137112.
- Frazier, Patrick (1994). The Mohicans of Stockbridge. University of Nebraska Press. ISBN 9780803268821.
- Fryer, Mary Beacock (1986). Battlefields of Canada. Toronto: Dundurn Press. ISBN 1-55002-007-2.
- Gallay, Alan (2015). Colonial Wars of North America, 1512–1763 (Routledge Revivals): An Encyclopedia Routledge Revivals. Routledge. ISBN 9781317487197.
- Laramie, Michael G (2012). The European Invasion of North America: Colonial Conflict Along the Hudson-Champlain Corridor, 1609–1760. ABC-CLIO. ISBN 9780313397370.
- Loescher, Burt Garfield (2009). The history of Rogers' rangers, Volume 1. Heritage Books Inc. ISBN 9780788417412.
- Long, J. C (2013). Lord Jeffery Amherst: A Soldier of the King. Literary Licensing, LLC. ISBN 9781494107093.
- MacLeod, D. Peter (2016). Backs to the Wall: The Battle of Sainte-Foy and the Conquest of Canada. D & M Publishers. ISBN 9781771621281.
- Malartic, Anne-Joseph-Hippolyte de Maurès (2016). Journal des campagnes au Canada de 1755 à 1760 (in French). Collection XIX. ISBN 9782346083923.
- Mayo, Lawrence Shaw (2010). Jeffery Amherst – A Biography. Read Books Design. ISBN 9781445534169.
- Nester, William R (2000). The First Global War: Britain, France, and the Fate of North America, 1756–1775. Greenwood Publishing Group. ISBN 9780275967710.
- O'Toole, Fintan (2015). White Savage: William Johnson and the Invention of America Volume 2. Faber & Faber. ISBN 9780571319411.
- Parkman, Texas; Parkman, Francis; Levin, David (1983). France and England in North America: Count Frontenac and New France under Louis XIV A half-century of conflict. Montcalm and Wolfe. Library of America. ISBN 9780940450110.
- Schumann, Matt & Schweizer, Karl W (2012). The Seven Years War: A Transatlantic History War, History and Politics. Routledge. ISBN 9781134160686.
- Snow, Dan (2009). Death Or Victory: The Battle for Quebec and the Birth of Empire. Harper Collins UK. ISBN 9780007286201.
- Williams, Noel St. John (1998). Redcoats Along the Hudson: The Struggle for North America, 1754–63. Brassey's Classics Series. ISBN 9781857532241.
- Vaugeois, Denis (2002). The Last French and Indian War. McGill-Queen's Press – MQUP. ISBN 9780773574274.
