= Battle of the Thousand Islands =

1760 conflict of the Seven Years' War

- Part of the Montreal Campaign of the French and Indian War
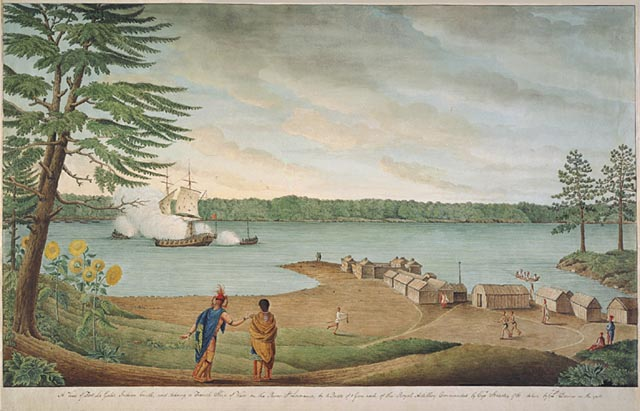
- Williamson's gunboats capture the French corvette L'Outaouaise near Point au Baril, painted by Thomas Davies
| Date | 16–24 August 1760 |
| Location | Across from Cardinal, Saint Lawrence River, Thousand Islands 44°44′27.1″N 75°26′30.0″W |
| Result | British-Haudenosaunee victory |

Belligerents
| Great Britain: British America; Haudenosaunee Confederacy | France: (New France) Colony of Canada |

Commanders and leaders
| (Kingdom of Great Britain) Jeffery Amherst | (Kingdom of France) Pierre Pouchot |

Strength
| 11,000 regulars and provincial troops 700 Haudenosaunee | 300 regulars, militia, sailors and voyageurs |

Casualties and losses
| 26 dead 47 wounded (likely excluding militia) | 300 dead, wounded, or captured |

The Battle of the Thousand Islands was an engagement fought on 16–24 August 1760, in the upper St. Lawrence River, among the Thousand Islands, along the present day Canada–United States border, by British and French forces during the closing phases of the Seven Years' War, as it is called in Canada and Europe, or the French and Indian War as it is referred to in the United States.

The engagement took place at Fort Lévis (about one mile (1.6 km) downstream from the modern Ogdensburg–Prescott International Bridge), Pointe au Baril (present-day Maitland, Ontario), and the surrounding waters and islands during the Montreal Campaign. The small French garrison at Fort Lévis held the much larger British army at bay for over a week, managing to sink two British warships and to cripple a third. Their resistance delayed the British advance to Montreal from the west.

== Background and forces ==
By August 1760, the French were building Fort Lévis at Île Royale (present-day Chimney Island New York) in the St. Lawrence River. Captain Pierre Pouchot was assigned its defense. Pouchot had been taken prisoner after the siege of Fort Niagara, but he was later released in a prisoner exchange. Chevalier de Lévis' original design for the fort called for stone walls, 200 guns and some 2,500 troops. What Pouchot had was a small fort with wooden stockades, five cannon and 200 soldiers. Also under Pouchot's command were the corvettes l'Outaouaise and l'Iroquoise, crewed by 200 sailors and voyageurs. l'Iroquoise, under command of Commodore René Hypolite Pépin dit La Force, was armed with ten 12-pound cannon and swivel guns . l'Outaouaise, commanded by Captain Pierre Boucher de LaBroquerie carried ten 12-pounders, one 18-pound gun and swivel guns.

After the fall of Quebec in the 1759 Battle of the Plains of Abraham, British Commander-in-Chief General Jeffery Amherst prepared to launch a three-pronged attack to take Montreal. Columns were to advance along the Saint Lawrence River from Quebec to the northeast, up the Richelieu River from Lake Champlain to the south, and from Oswego on Lake Ontario to the west. The latter force, which Amherst led personally, numbered some 10,000 men and 100 siege guns.

Soon after his arrival to Île Royal, Pouchot ordered abandonment of the nearby mission Fort de La Présentation and the shipyard and stockades at Pointe au Baril to consolidate his resources at the more defendable Fort Lévis. La Force had run his corvette l'Iroquoise aground at Pointe au Baril on 1 August. Although l'Iroquoise was raised, it was deemed too damaged to be put into action. It was beached again under the guns at Fort Lévis.

Amherst's force set out from Oswego on 10 August. Captain Joshua Loring, who commanded the British snows Onondaga and Mohawk, had been sent ahead of Amherst's force as an advance guard. Onondaga had been launched at Fort Niagara as Apollo in 1759. Commanded by Loring, it carried four 9-pound guns, fourteen 6-pounders and a crew of 100 seamen and 25 soldiers. Mohawk, commanded by Lieutenant David Phipps, carried sixteen 6-pounders and a crew of 90 seamen and 30 soldiers.

== Battle ==
On 7 August, French lookouts sighted Onondaga and Mohawk from their outpost at Ile aux Chevreuils, upstream from Fort Lévis. The French withdrew in a row galley, pursued by Onondaga and Mohawk. The two British vessels got lost in the maze of islands, and did not find their way back to the main channel for several days.

Amherst's force arrived at Pointe au Baril on 16 August. Fearing the remaining French ship might attack his transports, Amherst ordered Colonel George Williamson to capture l'Outaouaise the following day. At dawn of 17 August, Williamson set out in a gig, accompanied by five row galleys (one armed with a howitzer, the others each armed with a single 12-pounder. The galleys took shelter fore and aft of l'Outaouaise, where they could not be hit by the ship's broadsides. The British galleys fired grapeshot and round shot at the French ship, crippling l'Outaouaise, which drifted helplessly towards the British battery set up at Pointe au Baril. After three hours of fighting, l'Outaouaise had managed to fire around 72 shots, damaging two of the British galleys. LaBroquerie was forced to surrender l'Outaouaise to Williamson. LaBroquerie was wounded in the fighting. Fifteen members of his crew were killed or wounded.

The captured l'Outaouaise was repaired and renamed Williamson, to be put back into service by Captain Patrick Sinclair against her former owners. On 19 August, Amherst commenced the attack on Fort Lévis. La Force and his crew had been ordered back from the beached l'Iroquoise to the fort to assist with its defense. Williamson was hit 48 times by the five French guns when it joined in with the British batteries firing on Fort Lévis from surrounding islands. Mohawk and Onondaga finally arrived at the scene in the evening and Amherst called a ceasefire for the night. The attack resumed at dawn on 20 August with Williamson, Mohawk and Onondaga all firing on the fort with a combined 50 guns. As the attack progressed, the French guns hit and sank Williamson and Onondaga. Mohawk ran aground under the French cannon, where it sat helpless as it was pounded until out of action. The British batteries on the surrounding islands continued to fire, switching to "hot shot", used to start fires within the fort. The siege continued until 24 August when Pouchot ran out of ammunition for his guns and asked for terms.

== Aftermath ==
The fighting cost the British 26 killed and 47 wounded (likely excluding militia) to the French losses of around 275 of the original 300 defenders killed or wounded. Pouchot was amongst the wounded. The British could hardly believe that such a small garrison had offered such spirited resistance.

After the battle, Amherst's force remained at Fort Lévis for another four days before continuing toward Montreal. The British advance cost Amherst at least 84 more men drowned in the rapids of the St. Lawrence (although Pouchot puts this number at 336). He went on to meet the forces from Quebec and Lake Champlain and completely surrounded Montreal. The three-pronged British forces totaling 17,000 men began to converge on the town, burning villages along the way and prompting mass desertions from the Canadian militia. On 8 September, Montreal was surrendered by New France's governor, the Marquis de Vaudreuil, to avoid further bloodshed.

The British renamed Fort Lévis Fort William Augustus. They raised the three vessels sunk during the battle (Williamson, Onondaga and Mohawk) and put them back into service to patrol the waters between the fort and Fort Niagara.
