= Patrick Sinclair =

British Army general

Lieutenant-General Patrick Sinclair (1736 – 31 January 1820) was a British Army officer and governor in North America. He is best remembered for overseeing the construction of Fort Mackinac on Mackinac Island in what was to become the U.S. state of Michigan.

== Biography ==
Sinclair was born in Lybster, Scotland, and enlisted in the Army at about age 18. In 1758 he was commissioned ensign in the 42nd Foot and was involved in the attack on Guadeloupe later that year.

By 1760, Sinclair was at Oswego, New York, where he was promoted lieutenant, and involved in the Seven Years' War. His battalion were part of the force heading to attack Montreal under the command of Major-General Amherst. They captured a French brig near Fort Lévis and Sinclair was given command. After Amherst's force captured Fort Lévis in what became known as the Battle of the Thousand Islands, Sinclair was assigned to the area for the rest of Amherst's campaign. In 1761 he exchanged into the 15th Foot in order to stay in the area.

This contact with the Great Lakes attracted Sinclair and he was able to change his commission to serve on the lakes. He started out commanding ships on Lake Ontario but, in 1764, he was moved to the upper Great Lakes where he served until 1767. In 1767, he was removed from active service at Fort Sinclair, which he had built in 1764 under orders from Colonel John Bradstreet.

In 1769, he went to England on a recruiting trip and tried to be reassigned to the Great Lakes. He was promoted captain in 1772, but retired to his home in Lybster at half-pay later the same year.

However, in 1775, his wish to return to the Great Lakes was granted with an appointment as Lieutenant-Governor and Superintendent of Michilimackinac. He was thwarted in taking up his post by unrest in the Thirteen Colonies and he reached his posting via Nova Scotia and Quebec in 1779. He almost immediately began to move Fort Michilimackinac and its community to Mackinac Island. There, after an extreme effort and large expense, Fort Mackinac was occupied in 1781. In 1781, Sinclair joined the 84th Foot. By 1782, when he was promoted major, his expenses had come under investigation and he returned to Quebec to untangle his finances.

Sinclair was not able to clear up his problems but he was allowed to return to Lybster. He continued to work on clearing up unpaid bills and ended up in debtors' prison for a time. He never recovered financially and spent his remaining years on his estate drawing his half pay from the military and also from his time as lieutenant-governor of Michilimackinac.

In 1793 he was promoted lieutenant-colonel, in 1797 colonel, in 1803 major general, and in 1810 lieutenant-general.

As a private citizen, Sinclair acquired a large tract of land, which he called the Pinery, on the west bank of the St. Clair River in eastern Michigan. In 1780, Jean Baptiste Point du Sable, a prisoner at Fort Michilimackinac was the caretaker of the property. Du Sable and his wife, Kitiwaha, a Potawatomi Indian, oversaw the Pinery for four years, living in a cabin at the mouth of the Pine River in what is now the city of St. Clair, Michigan. Later in the 1780s, they became the original settlers of Chicago.
