= HMS Mohawk (1759) =

History

Great Britain
- Name: HMS Mohawk
- Ordered: 1759
- Builder: Peter Jacquet, Fort Niagara
- Laid down: 1759
- Launched: 1759
- Commissioned: 1759
- Fate: Wrecked in 1764

General characteristics
- Class & type: Snow
- Sail plan: Square rigged
- Complement: 90 seamen + 30 soldiers
- Armament: 16 × 6 pdr (2.7 kg) guns

HMS Mohawk was a snow constructed on the Great Lakes in North America that participated in the Battle of the Thousand Islands during the French and Indian War. Mohawk was launched in 1759; historians dispute her origin, with one stating that she was initially a French vessel under construction at Fort Niagara before the British captured the fort. Another historian claims the snow was ordered for construction in response to the existing French naval threat on the St. Lawrence River and Lake Ontario. Mohawk was wrecked in 1764.

== Description ==
Mohawk was a snow, a two-masted, square-rigged sailing ship. She was armed with sixteen 6-pounder (2.7 kg) guns and had a complement of 90 officers and ratings. Mohawk also carried 30 soldiers.

== Construction and career ==
Historians disagree on Mohawk;s origin. Fryer states that she was one of two vessels that the French commander, Captain Pierre Pouchot, had started to build at Fort Niagara before its capture by the British on 25 July 1759. Malcomson states that the British commander, General Sir Jeffrey Amherst ordered the construction of two snows, Mohawk and Onondoga (originally named Apollo), to combat the French corvettes Iroquoise and Outaouaise for control of the St. Lawrence River and Lake Ontario. Mohawk was constructed by the master shipbuilder Peter Jacquet from Pennsylvania, who arrived in mid-1759 to begin construction of the snows. Mohawk was launched in early autumn 1759. Commissioned under the command of Lieutenant Thomas Thornton, she sailed to Oswego, New York.

Mohawk remained idle until June 1760 when Amherst sent an army to Oswego and the British naval commander on the Great Lakes, Captain Joshua Loring, arrived with a detachment of sailors. On 14 July, Loring arrived at Oswego with Onondoga and the army departed in their bateaux, row galleys, and whaleboats downriver for the assault on Fort Lévis. Under the command of Lieutenant David Phipps, Mohawk escorted Amherst's army downriver. The French had stationed a galley at Île aux Chevreuils to keep a lookout for the British. When Mohawk and Onondoga spotted the galley, they gave chase. The French galley disappeared into a channel along the north shore. The waters were uncharted and both Mohawk and Onondoga sailed into a shallow, dead-end channel. The two vessels had to be kedged out slowly as the army passed them by.

By 20 August the two snows arrived at Fort Lévis to join in the bombardment of the French that had begun after the British had captured Outaouaise, which they renamed Williamson. Mohawk and the other two British ships approached the island fortress on 23 August and bombarded it at close range. The return fire from the French forced Williamson and Mohawk to withdraw and sank Onondoga. (Note: Fryer states that Mohawk was run aground and "battered to pieces" while Onondoga and Williamson were destroyed. Nester states that French fire battered Williams and Mohawk and drove them aground, but that the British were able to forestall the French from capturing Onondoga and were able to withdraw her after dark. Cubbison states Williamson and Mohawk had to be repaired, but that Onondoga was so damaged that she was not salvageable; her guns, ammunition, and stores were used in the repair of Fort Lévis.) The bombardment ended on 25 August when Fort Lévis surrendered, ending the Battle of the Thousand Islands. With the end of the French naval threat on the St. Lawrence River, Mohawk transported supplies from Oswego to Amherst's army. Mohawk was wrecked in 1764.
