= François Picquet =

French-Canadian Sulpician priest

François Picquet (French pronunciation: [fʁɑ̃swa pikɛ]; 4 December 1708 – 15 July 1781) was a French Sulpician priest who emigrated to Montreal, Canada, in 1734.

== Early life ==
Picquet was born in Bourg-en-Bresse, France, on 4 December 1708, the son of André Picquet and Marie-Philippe Berthet. In 1728 he entered the seminary of Lyons, where he was ordained deacon in 1731. At the Saint-Sulpice Seminary (Issy-les-Moulineaux) in Paris, after winning his doctorate at the Sorbonne, he was ordained to the priesthood in 1734, and became a Sulpician.

== Canada ==
Picquet arrived in Montreal in 1734. He served the local parish for five years while studying Indian languages and customs. He became proficient in the Algonquin and Iroquois languages.

From 1739 to 1749, he served at Lac des Deux Montagnes, where there was a Sulpician mission. During King George's War (1744–1748) between France and Britain, the Indian allies of these two powers came to arms. Due to Picquet's influence, the Five Nations, hitherto allies of the British, remained neutral, while the others carried out several raids in New England or served as scouts for the French troops. It was during that period that Picquet made the decision to work with the Indians south of the Great Lakes for conversion and to ensure their loyalty to France. In 1748 a commitment was made by Roland-Michel Barrin de La Galissonière, the Governor General of New France, to send Picquet to the Thousand Islands area for that purpose.

In 1749, Picquet built a mission fort named Fort de La Présentation near the junction of the Oswegatchie River and the St Lawrence River. By 1755 it had a large population of Iroquois loyal to France. In 1758, with the Seven Years' War intensifying, a military commander was put in charge of that new aspect of the fort. Picquet was displeased with this dilution of his authority and left the fort for Lake of Two Mountains. He was back in July, 1758, to lead his Indian troops in the battle of Carillon. He also was part of Louis de la Corne's excursion to the Oswego area the following year.

In 1759, the mission fort was abandoned in favour of Fort Lévis and Picquet fled to Montreal with his Indian troops. He left there for New Orleans where he stayed for a time.

== Return to France ==
Picquet returned to France in 1772. He took up a ministry at Verjon and then as a chaplain to the nuns of the Visitation. A private audience with Pope Pius VI occurred in 1777 and he retired in 1779. He died at Verjon, Ain, France, in 1781.

== Sources ==
- Shea, John Gilmary. 1855. History of the Catholic missions among the Indian tribes of the United States: 1529-1854. Dunigan. [See especially pp. 335–340. Available via Google Books.]
