= Fort de La Présentation =

French fort in upstate New York

- Ogdensburg, New York
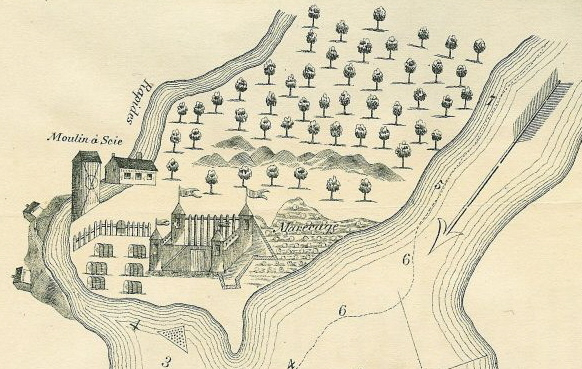
- Map of Fort de La Presentation

Site information
- Type: Fort
- Controlled by: New France

Site history
- Built: 1749
- In use: 1749–1760
- Battles/wars
- Fort de La Présentation Site
- U.S. National Register of Historic Places
- Location within New York Location within the United States
- Location: Lighthouse Point, near Ogdensburg, New York
- Coordinates: 44°41′44″N 75°30′03″W
- Area: 23.75 acres (9.61 ha)
- NRHP reference No.: 10000944
- Added to NRHP: 26 November 2010

The Fort de La Présentation (French pronunciation: [fɔʁ də la pʁezɑ̃tasjɔ̃]; "Fort of the Presentation"), a mission fort, was built in 1749 and so named by the French Sulpician priest, Abbé Picquet. It was also sometimes known as Fort La Galette (French pronunciation: [fɔʁ la galɛt]). It was built at the confluence of the Oswegatchie River and the St Lawrence River in present-day New York. The French wanted to strengthen their alliance with the powerful Haudenosaunee, as well as convert them to Catholicism. With increasing tensions with Great Britain, they were concerned about their thinly populated Canadian colony. By 1755 the settlement included 3,000 Haudenosaunee residents loyal to France, in part because of the fur trade, as well as their hostility to encroachment by British colonists in their other territories. By comparison, Montréal had only 4,000 residents.

In 1758, with the Seven Years' War intensifying, a French-Canadian military commander took charge of a garrison at the fort. In 1759, French military forces abandoned the fort to move to Fort Lévis. Ultimately the British besieged that fort and Montréal.

After the British victories of 1760, the French ceded their Canadian territory to Great Britain. The British renamed it Fort Oswegatchie. It remained under their control until 1796, after Jay's Treaty, when redefinition of the northern boundary caused the land to be taken over by the United States. The first settlement under an American flag began that year. American residents named the town Ogdensburg after early settler Samuel Ogden.

== Background ==
As the colony of New France expanded into the Great Lakes, the St. Lawrence River became a vital link connecting outposts on the lakes to Montréal. The French began establishing fortifications to secure the route to prevent Anglo-American expansion. Sometime before 1683, the French had built Fort la Galette, a fortified post located on the St. Lawrence River along the northern shore of the river (near present Prescott, Ontario). The fortified post was mainly used as a trading site and was abandoned and reoccupied several times.

== Establishment of the fort ==
As the Anglo-Americans continued to expand westward, the French chose a site at the meeting of the Oswegatchie River and the St. Lawrence River to establish a new fort. Located on the south side of the St. Lawrence River, the fort was based on the existing mission that had been erected there as early as 1688. The site had a good harbor and was situated to prevent the Anglo-Americans from coming up the Oswegatchie River and simultaneously prevented further expansion west of Fort Oswego.

Aside from impeding the Anglo-Americans, the purpose of the fort was to Christianize the Haudenosaunee. Led by the Sulpician priest, Abbé Picquet, the mission was a source of some controversy as Picquet actively encouraged Haudenosaunee war party raids on English settlements. Construction began in 1748, with the initial fort composed of a small house and a barn and a garrison of three soldiers. On 1 June 1749, the fort was officially established by Picquet, who was its commander, with 25 Frenchmen and 4 Indians. By late 1749, early 1750, the fort was expanded to included quarters for the commandant, missionaries and storekeeper. Four large timbers towers built on masonry foundations had been erected and were connected by a wooded palisade. A larger detachment of the Compagnies Franches de la Marine had arrived and approximately 300 Haudenosaunee, Huron and other Indians were housed at the fort.

In 1749, the population aside from the garrison comprised six Haudenosaunee families. By 1751, there were 396 families distributed among three villages. The villages were composed of 49 bark cabins, 60–80 feet (18–24 m) long, which lodged three to four families each. There were also approximately 20 cabins near the fort. By 1756, trenches were constructed around the villages.

== French and Indian War ==
Beginning in 1755, Picquet began taking part in military expeditions as part of the French and Indian War, leaving Abbé Pierre-Paul-François de Lagarde in charge of the fort. The fort was an important link in the defence of New France as news from the Great Lakes and from among the Indians would arrive there first and be redirected to the appropriate authority. However, as the war with the Anglo-Americans grew Picquet was removed as commander of the fort by Governor Vaudreuil, replaced by Captain Claude-Nicolas de Lorimier de La Rivière, while keeping his position as chief missionary. This led to a rift as Picquet was the de facto leader of the Indians and trained them in warfare, while Lorimier was left in command of just the French. Lorimier led his Frenchmen in the attack on Fort Bull in 1756, and Lorimier's garrison was used to watch the British at Fort Oswego. In November 1757, a raid was launched from Fort de La Présentation on the British settlement of German Flatts in the Mohawk Valley, which saw the settlement destroyed on 12 November.

In February 1758, after Picquet had withdrawn to his abbey in Lac-des-Deux-Montagnes, the Indians petitioned for his return. The fall of Fort Frontenac in August 1758 increased the threat to the fort and Lorimier was recalled, replaced by Captain Antoine-Gabriel-François Benoist. With Lorimier's dismissal, Picquet returned to Fort de La Présentation. Furthermore, on 30 August, 1,500 soldiers were stationed at Fort de La Présentation to block any British push down the St. Lawrence, making the fort the center of the French defences. Benoist was replaced by Captain Pierre Pouchot in March 1759.

=== Pointe-au-Baril ===
With the fall of Fort Frontenac in August 1758, New France lacked a shipbuilding facility between the upper Great Lakes and Montréal. A site was chosen on the north shore of the St. Lawrence River 5.6 miles (9 km) west of Fort de La Présentation. Pointe-au-Baril, located in present-day Maitland, Ontario, was established in 1759. Pointe-au-Baril was a fortified shipbuilding site with inner earthworks and an outer palisade 10–12 feet (3–4 m) high. On 4 April 1759, Captain Pierre Pouchot was given temporary command of both Pointe-au-Baril and Fort de La Présentation until the two corvettes under construction there were completed.

=== Battle of the Thousand Islands ===
By August 1760, only Pointe-au-Baril, Fort de La Présentation, and Montréal were left in French control along the upper St. Lawrence River. Pouchot, who had been captured at Fort Niagara and returned in a prisoner exchange, was sent to establish a new fort, Fort Lévis on an island in the St. Lawrence River, downstream from Fort de La Présentation. Due to Fort de La Présentation's location on low ground, the fort was susceptible to bombardment by British guns and Pouchot ordered its evacuation. Picquet moved his mission to Île Picquet, but lacked the support of the French and his Indian allies began to starve and depart. In March 1760, Picquet abandoned the mission and departed for Montréal. In July, the French sent a party to Fort de La Présentation to begin the fort's demolition, removing the roofs of the buildings. However, some Haudenosaunee remained in the villages, sending war parties on occasion to scout.

On 16 August 1760, the British under General Jeffery Amherst captured the abandoned Pointe-au-Baril and established an artillery battery. From 19 to 24 August in the Battle of the Thousand Islands, Fort Lévis was assaulted by the British before surrendering. French control over the area was broken. During the battle, Fort de La Présentation was occupied by the British, with a garrison composed of three provincial regiments from Connecticut under the command of Colonel Nathan Whiting. They established a supply base at the fort during the siege of Fort Lévis.

== Fort de La Présentation site ==
The Fort de La Présentation Site is an archaeological site located on Lighthouse Point, near Ogdensburg, St. Lawrence County, New York. It encompasses the remains of at least eight different and discrete potential components, as identified in 1987–1988. These include four contributing components: remains from French and Native American occupation during the period 1749 to 1760; remains from English and Native American occupation during the period 1760 to 1796; remains from American settlers in Ogdensburg during the period 1796 to 1812; and remains from American military occupation during the War of 1812.

The site was listed on the National Register of Historic Places in 2010.

== Sources ==
- Chartrand, René (2008). The Forts of New France in Northeast America 1600–1763. Oxford, UK: Osprey Publishing. ISBN 978-1-846-03255-4.
- Cubbison, Douglas R. (2014). All Canada in the Hands of the British: General Jeffrey Amherst and the 1760 Campaign to Conquer New France. Norman, Oklahoma: University of Oklahoma Press. ISBN 978-0-8061-4427-6.
- Fryer, Mary Beacock (1986). Battlefields of Canada. Toronto: Dundurn Press. ISBN 1-55002-007-2.
- Lahaise, Robert (1979). "Picquet, François". In Halpenny, Francess G. (ed.). Dictionary of Canadian Biography. Vol. IV (1771–1800) (online ed.). University of Toronto Press.
- MacLeod, Michael (1974). "Lorimier de la Rivère, Claude-Nicolas de". In Halpenny, Francess G. (ed.). Dictionary of Canadian Biography. Vol. III (1741–1770) (online ed.). University of Toronto Press.
- Moogk, Peter N. (1974). "Pouchot, Pierre". In Halpenny, Francess G. (ed.). Dictionary of Canadian Biography. Vol. III (1741–1770) (online ed.). University of Toronto Press.
- O'Callaghan, Edmund Bailey, ed. (1853). Documents relative to the colonial history of the state of New York. Vol. 9. Albany, New York: Weed, Parsons and Company.
- Taillemite, Étienne (1979). "Benoist, Antoine-Gabriel-François Benoist". In Halpenny, Francess G. (ed.). Dictionary of Canadian Biography. Vol. IV (1771–1800) (online ed.). University of Toronto Press.
