= Battle of La Belle-Famille =

1759 battle of the French and Indian War

Coordinates: 43°14.502′N 79°3.045′W

- Part of the French and Indian War
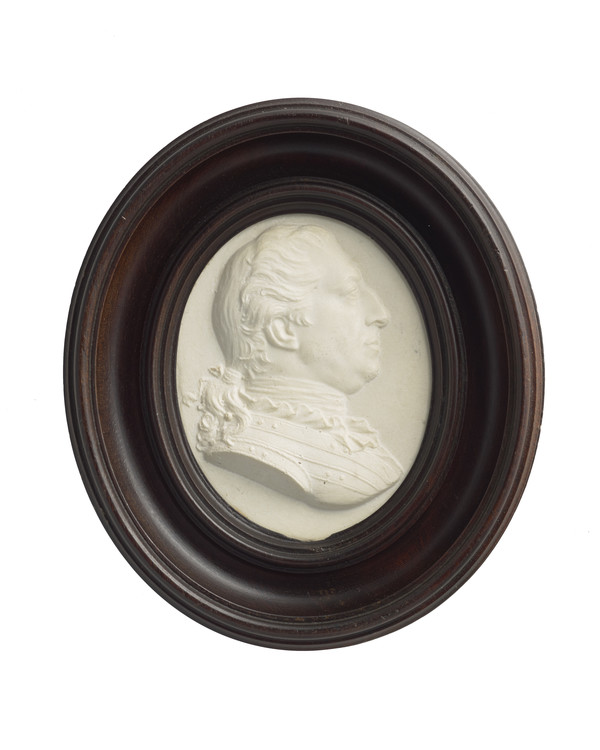
- Marble portrait of Eyre Massey
| Date | July 24, 1759 |
| Location | Two miles (3 km) south of Fort Niagara |
| Result | British-Haudenosaunee victory |

Belligerents
| France: (New France) Colony of Canada | Great Britain: British America; Haudenosaunee |

Commanders and leaders
| (New France) François de Lignery (DOW); Charles Aubry; Michel de Chauvignerie | (Kingdom of Great Britain) Eyre Massey; Sayenqueraghta |

Strength
| 800 regulars and militia 500 Native Americans | 350 regulars 100 New York militia 450 Haudenosaunee |

Casualties and losses
| At least 334 killed At least 96 captured | 12 dead 40 wounded |

The Battle of La Belle-Famille occurred on July 24, 1759, during the French and Indian War along the Niagara Portage trail. François-Marie Le Marchand de Lignery's French relief force for the besieged French garrison at Fort Niagara fell into Eyre Massey's British and Haudenosaunee ambush. This action formed part of the larger Battle of Fort Niagara.

The British knew of the French approach well in advance and constructed a breastwork across the road about two miles south of Fort Niagara. The French were ambushed, their force was routed, with many casualties. Captain Le Marchand de Lignery was mortally wounded in the battle.

== Background ==
British General Jeffery Amherst made plans for the 1759 military campaigns of the French and Indian War that included an expedition to capture Fort Niagara, a major French military and supply point between the French province of Canada and their forts in the Ohio Country. Amherst chose Brigadier General John Prideaux to lead the expedition, which was accompanied by Sir William Johnson, the British Indian agent who led the expedition's Haudenosaunee forces. Prideaux arrived at Fort Niagara on July 6 and immediately began siege operations. On July 20, Prideaux was killed when struck by a shell fragment thrown from one of his own guns, and Sir William took over the siege operations.

Fort Niagara had been largely constructed under the direction of Captain Pierre Pouchot of the French Army. In early 1759, General Louis-Joseph de Montcalm and New France's Governor, the Marquis de Vaudreuil, sent him with about 2,500 men to fortify Niagara. About 500 men had wintered there. Pouchot, under orders from Vaudreuil, sent many of those men south to Fort Machault (later Fort Venango) in mid-June as part of a plan to reinforce the French forts of the Ohio Country and attack the British at Fort Pitt. When the British arrived on July 6, he immediately dispatched messages to the south, requesting support.

Captain Le Marchand de Lignery was organizing the French expedition against Fort Pitt from Fort Machault when Pouchot's appeal for help arrived on July 12. On that day, Lignery was trying to convince nearly 1,000 Indians to join in the planned attack against Fort Pitt. Johnson had sent messages to Fort Pitt, urging Indians there to join the British in attacking the French forts, and many Indians were unsure about which side to take. Lignery was able to rally support; when combined with forces under Charles Philippe Aubry, a large force left Fort Machault for Niagara. Messengers he sent to Pouchot also leaked news of their advance to the besieging British, who prepared an ambush.

Before the action, the British native allies told their French counterparts that they intended to remain neutral in the upcoming clash. They wished that the French native allies would do likewise. This induced many of the French-allied Indians to desert.

== Battle ==
Lignery and Aubry, in spite of their knowledge of Indian ways, apparently advanced without taking normal precautions against ambush, and marched right into a prepared trap.

Lieutenant Colonel Massey of the 46th Foot commanded 464 British regulars to defend the trail running north from Niagara Falls to Fort Niagara. On the right flank covering the portage trail, Massey deployed about 130 men of the 46th in the La Belle Famille clearing. Thrown forward from the right flank, just above the river gorge, were the grenadiers of the 46th and a small detachment of the 44th Foot. To the left of the 46th, the converged light companies of the 44th, 46th, and 4th battalion of the 60th Foot took position. On the extreme left stood a detachment from the 44th and New York Regiment. Understanding that his enemies included a significant number of regulars, Massey ordered the redcoats to lie down and fix bayonets.

As the French came out of the woods into the open, they immediately opened fire and began to deploy from column into line formation. Waiting until the French were within very close range, the British commander gave his troops the command to rise and fire. The 46th fired seven volleys, then advanced, firing at will. Massey later estimated that his men each fired about 16 rounds in the action. Meanwhile, the grenadier company's fire caught the French left flank in enfilade. When the French flinched before the deadly fire, the British attacked with the bayonet. French morale collapsed and the British-allied Haudenosaunee rushed the survivors.

The French began a panicked retreat, in which the British gave chase, according to one report, for as much as 5 miles (8.0 km). French casualties were significant, including Lignery, who sustained a mortal wound. Michel Maray de La Chauvignerie was captured during the battle. Massey was wounded.

== Aftermath ==
Pouchot surrendered Fort Niagara on July 26 after it became clear the relief column had been driven off.

Johnson, who was not present, wrote an account of the action which gave equal credit to the regulars and their native allies. To Massey's fury, this version reached the newspapers. The British officer later claimed that the tribesmen behaved "most dastardly" by slaughtering the wounded and those who were trying to surrender.
