= Battle of Fort Niagara =

1759 siege late in the French and Indian War

- Part of the French and Indian War
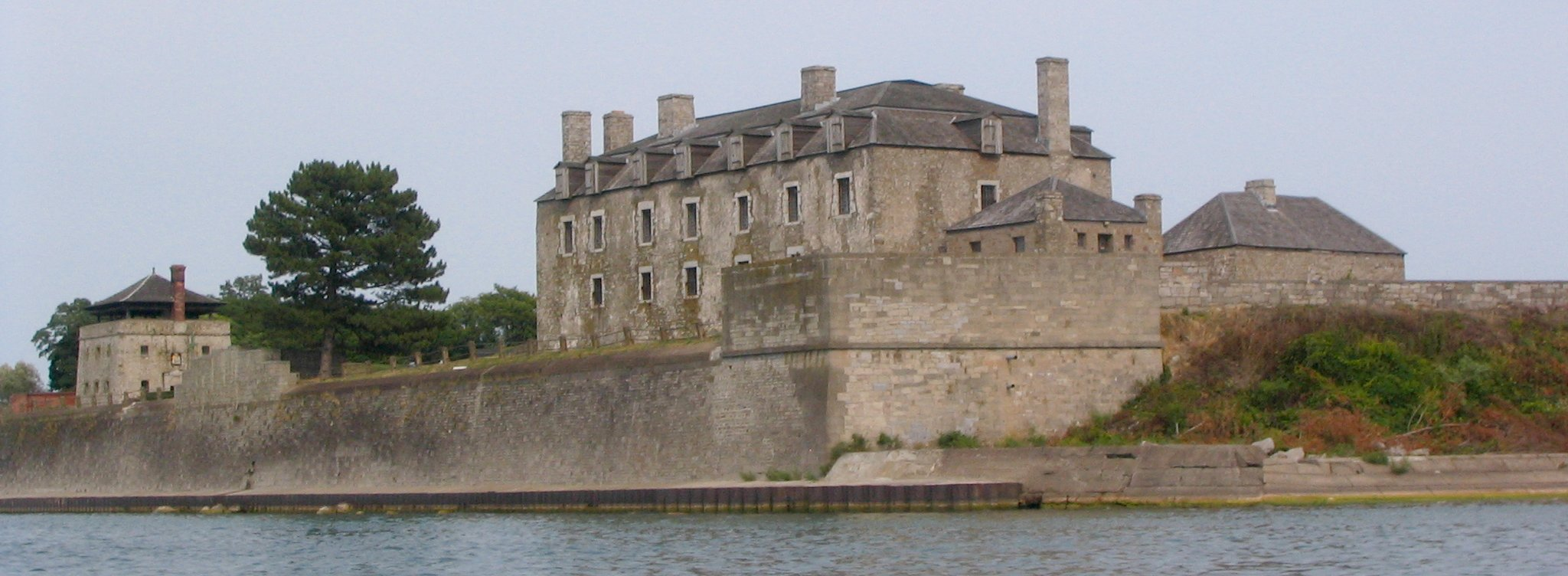
- Fort Niagara
Date	6–26 July 1759
Location	near present-day Youngstown, New York 43.262691°N 79.063314°W
Result	British-Haudenosaunee victory

Belligerents
France; (New France) Colony of Canada	Great Britain; British America; Haudenosaunee

Commanders and leaders
(Kingdom of France) Pierre Pouchot (POW) (Kingdom of France) Daniel-Marie Chabert de Joncaire de Clausonne	John Prideaux †; William Johnson; Sayenqueraghta

Strength
1,786 (Regulars, Canadians and Native Americans)	2,000 regulars 1,000 militia 945 Haudenosaunee

Casualties and losses
109 killed or wounded 377 captured	239 killed or wounded

The Battle of Fort Niagara was a siege late in the French and Indian War, the North American theatre of the Seven Years' War. The British siege of Fort Niagara in July 1759 was part of a campaign to remove French control of the Great Lakes and Ohio Valley regions, making possible a western invasion of the French province of Canada in conjunction with General James Wolfe's invasion to the east.

== Background ==
British General Jeffery Amherst made plans for the 1759 military campaigns of the Seven Years' War that included an expedition to capture Fort Niagara, a major French military and supply point between the French province of Canada and their forts in the Ohio Valley. Amherst chose Brigadier General John Prideaux to lead the expedition, which also included Sir William Johnson, the British Indian agent who led the expedition's Haudenosaunee forces.

Fort Niagara had been largely constructed under the direction of Captain Pierre Pouchot of the French Army. In early 1759, General Louis-Joseph de Montcalm and New France's governor, the Marquis de Vaudreuil, sent him with about 2,500 men to fortify Niagara beyond the 500 men that had wintered there. Pouchot, under orders from Vaudreuil, sent many of those men south to Fort Machault in mid-June as part of a plan to reinforce the French forts of the Ohio Country and attack the British at Fort Pitt. The forces left to defend Niagara consisted of about 200 men from the regiments of Royal Roussillon, Languedoc, La Sarre, and Béarn, 20 artillerymen, and about 300 provincial troops and militia.

Prideaux's British Army troops consisted of the 44th and 46th Regiments, and two companies from the 60th, numbering about 2,200 men. He also commanded 2500 provincial militia from New York and 700 from Rhode Island. Delayed by high water on the Mohawk River and the late arrival of some of the provincial companies, the expedition did not begin leaving Schenectady until mid-May. On 27 June the army arrived at Fort Oswego, where they were joined by Johnson and about 600 Haudenosaunee.

Leaving men behind to garrison Oswego Prideaux departed on 1 July for Niagara with about 3,200 men. While the French had ships patrolling Lake Ontario for British movements, inattention on the part of one of the crews allowed the British flotilla to avoid discovery. They arrived at Fort Niagara on 6 July, landed near a marsh out of sight of the fort, and immediately began siege operations.

== Siege ==
The French had about one hundred Haudenosaunee allies at the fort who withdrew to meet with the fellow Haudenosaunee who had accompanied the British. Captain Pouchot directed a vigorous defense.

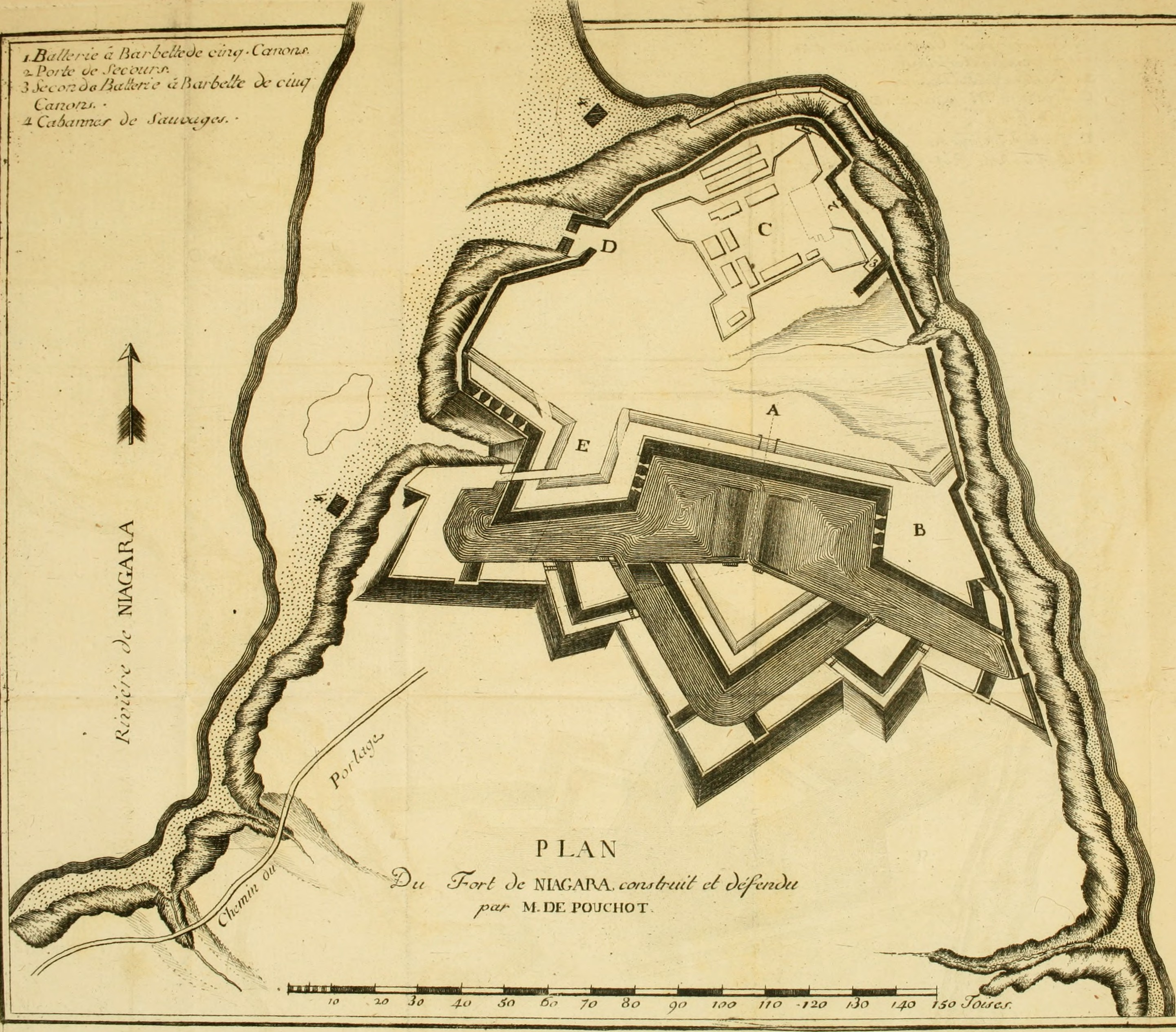
1781 map of Fort Niagara

Prideaux was killed when a shell fragment from one of his own guns hit him, and command of the British forces fell to Sir William Johnson. Johnson was a provincial officer and not in the regular army, and thus there was some question of his right to take command. But Sir William held a royal colonel's commission in his role as commander of the Haudenosaunee auxiliaries, and so he insisted on remaining in command after a lower-ranking regular army officer, Lieutenant Colonel Frederick Haldimand, arrived on the scene.

On 24 July, a French relief force led by François-Marie Le Marchand de Lignery, Charles Philippe Aubry, and Michel Maray de La Chauvignerie were ambushed and defeated at the Battle of La Belle-Famille two miles south of the fort. The French force at Fort Niagara capitulated on 26 July.

== Aftermath ==
The capitulation of Fort Niagara occurred on the same day that French troops abandoned Fort Carillon to an overwhelming British army under General Amherst. Following the surrender of Fort Niagara, the French abandoned other forts in the frontier, recalling garrisons to defend the populated areas of Canada. Forts abandoned by the French includes Fort St. Frédéric (in present-day Crown Point) and Fort Rouillé (in present-day Toronto). Fort St. Frédéric was destroyed as French troops abandoned Lake Champlain to protect the Canadian heartland. The garrison at Fort Rouillé was instructed to evacuate the area, and burn the fort should Fort Niagara fall. After the British captured Fort Niagara, the French garrison burned Fort Rouillé, and withdrew to Montreal. The remaining French forts in the Ohio and Illinois Country were eventually turned over to British forces.

In the same month, Montcalm led the defences against British General James Wolfe in the three-month siege of Quebec City. The colonial capital was taken in September 1759 at the Battle of the Plains of Abraham. During the next year, attempts were made by the French to recapture Quebec City, although their attempts were rebuffed with the arrival of British reinforcements. A year later after a two month campaign, Montreal was conquered by the British in September 1760, the administration of New France signed the Articles of Capitulation surrendering the colony of Canada to the British. The signing of the Articles of Capitulation saw the end of major combat operations in the North American theatre of the Seven Years' War.

== Bibliography ==
- Dunnigan, Brian Leigh (1996). Siege - 1759, The Campaign against Niagara. ISBN 0-941967-15-8.
- New York (State). Militia. Regiment of Provincials. (1759). Orderly book, 1759 June 21-Aug. 19 [transcript]. New York: Unpublished manuscript.
- Severance, Frank Hayward (1917). An Old Frontier of France. Dodd, Mead and Company. ISBN 978-0-405-02885-4. OCLC 5973820.
