= Constant le Marchand de Lignery =

French military officer in New France

Constant le Marchand de Lignery, generally known as Lignery (baptized March 27, 1662, in Charentilly, near Tours, France – February 19, 1732, in Trois-Rivières, New France) was a French military officer in New France (Canada). He was twice commandant at Michilimackinac.

== Background ==
Lignery was the son of Joseph le Marchand de Lignery and Marguerite Du Sillar. He began his military career in 1675 as a lieutenant in the Régiment d'Auvergne. In 1683, he transferred to the navy, serving as a midshipman at Rochefort. In 1687, he went to Canada as a lieutenant on half-pay. He was made a knight of the Order of Saint Louis in 1728.

He married Anne Robutel de La Noue, daughter of the seigneur de Île Saint-Paul, on November 10, 1691 in Montreal. They had seven sons and two daughters. The best known of these was François-Marie Le Marchand de Lignery, a captain in the colonial regular troops and knight of the Order of Saint-Louis. In the summer of 1759, this son was fatally wounded by the English in fighting near Fort Niagara.

== At Michilimackinac ==
He fought in the Iroquois War, where his service was recognized by his superiors. In 1688, he was promoted to lieutenant, and in 1705 to captain. In 1712, at the beginning of a 25-year war between the French and the Foxes, Canadian Governor Philippe de Rigaud de Vaudreuil sent him to reoccupy the former post of Michilimackinac, which had been abandoned by royal orders in 1696.

== War against the Foxes ==
A few years later, in 1715, acting Governor Claude de Ramezay placed him in command of a major expedition against the Foxes. He was ordered to assemble a force of coureurs de bois. and northern Indians and lead them to the Chicago portage. This force would join a second force, recruited among the Indians of the southern Great Lakes, and move together against the Foxes. However, due to a series of mishaps — the supply convoy from Montreal did not arrive on time and the French volunteers were unruly and hard to discipline — the southern contingent never assembled; neither did Lignery and his army reach the assembly point. On December 1, 1715, a Fox war party led by Pemoussa (He Who Walks) attacked the French expedition along the Chicago lakefront, driving the French and their Indian allies back toward Michigan.

Lignery returned to the command of Michilimackinac in 1722 after an absence of about three years. The Foxes were again at war with the French, attacking whites and natives in the Illinois country, a part of Louisiana. Louisiana, however, was a different colony from Canada, and Lignery and Vaudreuil adopted a policy of conciliation to preserve the peace in the west. In 1724, Lignery negotiated a treaty with the Foxes that ended their war on the Chippewas but allowed the war on the Illinois Indians to continue. Although Lignery denied it, officials in Louisiana and France felt that Vaudreuil and Lignery had sacrificed the southern colony to keep it from sharing in the western fur trade.

Two years later, acting Governor Charles Le Moyne de Longueuil sent Lignery back to Baie des Puants (Green Bay) to renegotiate the treaty. At a council on June 7, 1726 he was able to obtain a promise from the Foxes not to make war on any of the French allies.

== 1728 expedition against the Foxes ==
A new governor, Charles de la Boische, Marquis de Beauharnois, arrived in New France in 1726. In August 1728, he sent Lignery, recently promoted to major, in command of an army of 450 Frenchmen and 1,000 Indians against the Foxes. This was the largest force ever to advance so far into the interior, but it failed to secure a decisive engagement with the enemy. Lignery arrived at the fortified Fox village at the mouth of the Fox River on August 17. Here and elsewhere during the campaign, the Foxes fled to the west; the French could do no more than burn their villages and their crops. The expedition continued up the Fox River as far as the Wisconsin River portage before retracing their steps.

Governor Beauharnois blamed Lignery for the failure to defeat the Foxes. He made serious accusations against him in his report to the ministry, and Jean-Frédéric Phélypeaux, comte de Maurepas ordered him tried by a council of war. Lignery was accused of mismanaging supplies, of having been so slow in pursuit that the Foxes were able to make good their escape, of refusing to turn over command to his lieutenant in spite of having a debilitating illness, and of having abandoned large quantities of supplies at Michilimackinac on the return trip to Canada. After hearing witnesses and reviewing other evidence, the council of war unanimously dismissed the charges. Lignery died a short time later, in 1731 or 1732 (sources differ) in Trois-Rivières, where he had been named town major in 1728.
