= François-Marie Le Marchand de Lignery =

French colonial military leader (1703-1759)

- Born: 24 August 1703; Montreal, New France
- Died: 28 July 1759 (aged 55) near Fort Niagara, New France
- Spouse: Marie-Thérèse Migeon de La Gauchetièr (m. 1738)
- Children: 7
- Father: Constant le Marchand de Lignery
- Military career
- Allegiance: Kingdom of France
- Branch: French Army
- Service years: 1728–1759
- Rank: Colonel
- Unit: French colonial troupes de la marine
- Commands: Ohio Country defense
- Conflicts: Fox Wars; Chickasaw Wars; King George's War; Siege of Annapolis Royal; Battle of Grand Pré; French and Indian War; Battle of the Monongahela; Battle of Fort Duquesne; Battle of La Belle-Famille †
- Awards: Order of Saint Louis

François-Marie Le Marchand de Lignery (24 August 1703 – 29 July 1759) was a colonial military leader in the French province of Canada. Active in the defense of New France during the Seven Years' War (also known as the French and Indian War), he died of wounds sustained in the 1759 Battle of La Belle-Famille.

== Life ==
Born into a military family (his father was Constant le Marchand de Lignery, an officer of the French colonial military) in Montreal, Lignery enrolled as a cadet in the troupes de la marine at 14, and first saw service in 1728 during the Fox Wars. He also saw service in the Chickasaw Wars and King George's War, where he participated in attacks on Fort Anne and Grand Pré. In 1751 he was promoted to captain.

When the French and Indian War broke out, Lignery played an important role in the French defense of the Ohio Country. He distinguished himself in the defeat of Braddock in 1755, in which his company held the French center while Indians and Canadien militia were rallied early in the battle. For his role in the battle he was awarded the Cross of Saint Louis. Given military command of the entire Ohio Country in 1756, he used Fort Duquesne as a base from which to harass British colonial positions in Virginia and Pennsylvania. In 1758 he captured much of a British force led by James Grant that attempted to take Fort Duquesne. Unfortunately, a force he sent out to counterattack the advancing troops of John Forbes was repulsed, and he decided in November 1758 to abandon and destroy Duquesne when it became clear that Forbes' force significantly outnumbered his.

Lignery retreated to Fort Machault, from which he continued to direct harassing raids against the British in 1759. He was organizing an expedition against Fort Pitt (the fort built by the British on the site of Fort Duquesne) when he received an appeal for help from Pierre Pouchot, the commander at Fort Niagara. Pouchot had sent Lignery some troops, but was himself now under siege by the British and requested assistance. Lignery, who was trying to convince nearly 1,000 Indians to join in the attack on Fort Pitt at the time, convinced 500 to join his force of 800 troupes de la marine in a relief expedition. On June 24 his force was ambushed by the British as it neared Fort Niagara. The battle was a disaster for the French, and Lignery was seriously wounded and captured. Pouchot surrendered Niagara the next day, and Lignery died of his wounds on July 28.

== Family ==
Lignery married Marie-Thérèse, daughter of Daniel Migeon de La Gauchetièr, on 27 January 1738. They had seven children, five of whom survived to adulthood. His sons also served in the French military, and Marie-Thérèse moved to France and received a widow's pension.
