= Fort Lévis =

Fort in Canada

- Ogdensburg, New York
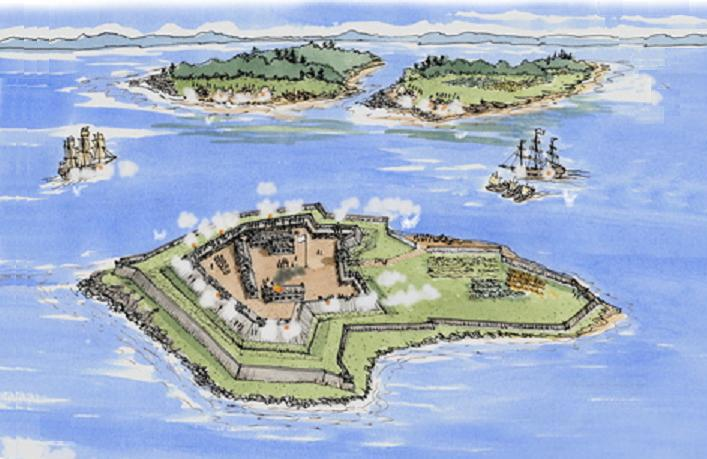
- Map of Fort Lévis

Site information
- Type: Fort
- Controlled by: New France

Site history
- Built: 1759
- In use: 1759–1760
- Battles/wars
- Fort Lévis
- U.S. National Register of Historic Places
- Location within New York
- Location: Isle Royale, near Ogdensburg, New York
- Coordinates: 44°44′27.1″N 75°26′30.0″W
- Area: 23.75 acres (9.61 ha)
- NRHP reference No.: 10000944
- Added to NRHP: 26 November 2010

Fort Lévis, a fortification on the St. Lawrence River, was built in 1759 by the French. They had decided that Fort de La Présentation was insufficient to defend their St. Lawrence River colonies against the British. Named for François Gaston de Lévis, Duc de Lévis, the fort was constructed on Isle Royale, 3 miles (4.8 km) downstream from the other fort. The fort surrendered after intense bombardment in August 1760 to the British and was renamed Fort William Augustus. The fort was abandoned in 1766. During the construction of the Saint Lawrence Seaway, the remains of the fort were destroyed and submerged beneath the waters of the river.

== Background ==
The French began settling the St. Lawrence River and establishing trade routes into the interior of the continent. To secure the areas of French settlement and trade, they began constructing forts along the shores of the waterways of their trade routes, including lakes and rivers. To the south along the St. Lawrence River, Fort de La Présentation was established on the southern shore of the river along with a shipyard along the northern shore at Pointe aux Baril. The French, finding the defences insufficient, ordered the construction of a new fort on Isle Royale in September 1759. (Note: The island was also known as Orakointon and is presently known as Chimney Island) The fort was ordered along the expected invasion route of the British during the French and Indian War, intended to protect the French and Iroquois inhabitants of the area. The site was chosen due to the island's steep cliffs and proximity to a series of rapids that would force attacking naval vessels to sail upstream one at a time.

== Description ==
The initial plan by the fort's namesake François Gaston de Lévis, Duc de Lévis, called for a stone fort armed with 200 guns and a garrison of 2,500. This did not have time to come to fruition and Fort Lévis was a large earthen and wood redoubt, which was one-log thick. There were casemates along the inner defenses, some were covered with open sides, while others were not covered. There were four barracks buildings and an armourer and blacksmith's shop, all located centrally. The island, located midstream of the St. Lawrence River, had a small harbor for vessels. The head of the fort's hornwork faced west with demi-bastions facing east.

The fort never received its 200 guns and by the time of the Battle of the Thousand Islands, was armed with several iron cannon with trunions removed and set in logs. Lacking their trunions these cannon were hard to maneuver. Additionally twelve 12-pounder (5.4 kg) guns, two 8-pounder (3.6 kg) guns, thirteen 4-pounder (1.8 kg) guns, four 1-pounder (0.45 kg) guns (all iron) and four brass 6-pounder (2.7 kg) guns were located within the fort.

== History ==
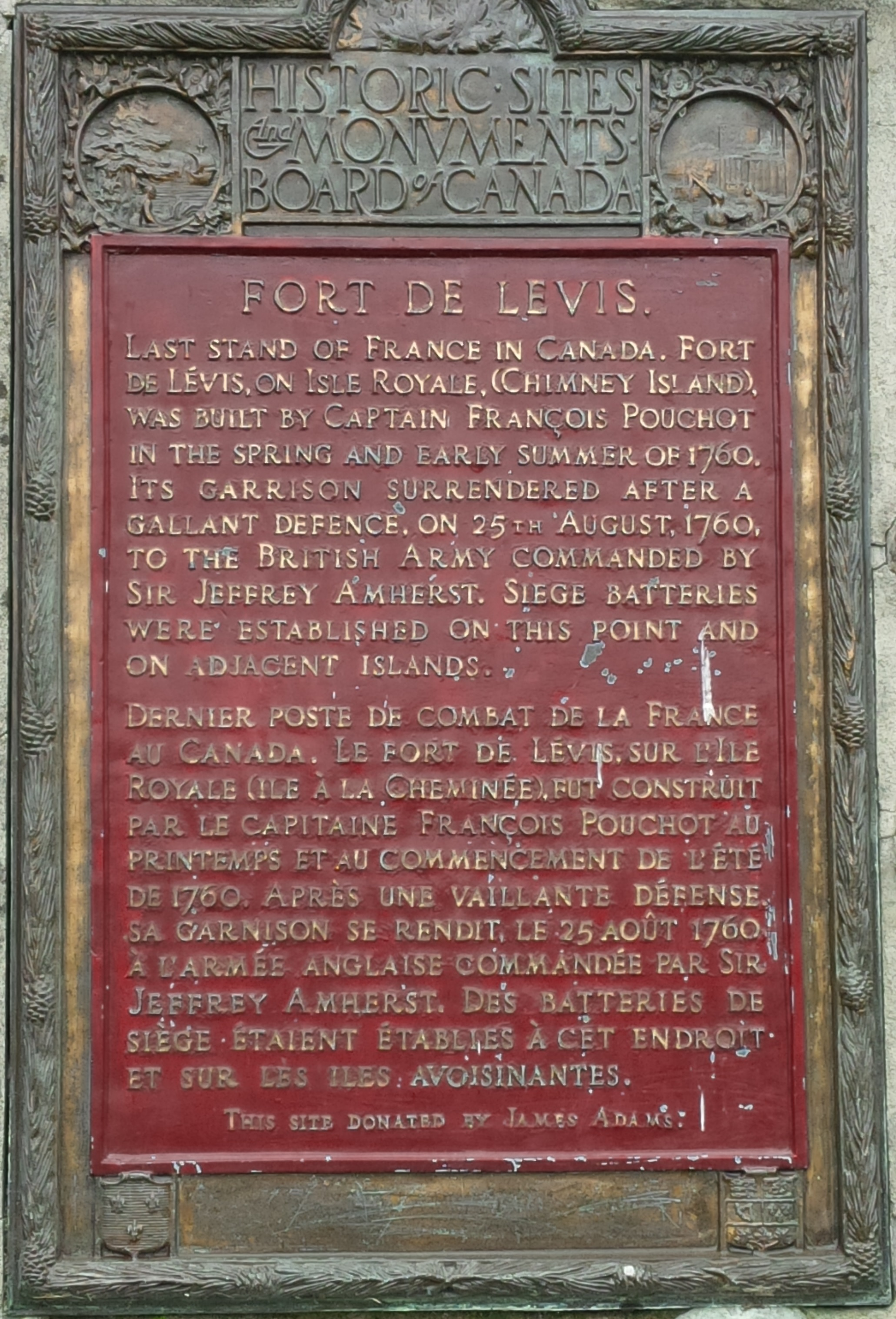
Fort de Lévis historical plate, 7 km (4.3 mi) east of Prescott, Ontario

Construction began in September 1759. In 1760 during the Seven Years' War, Major-General Amherst began a march on Montreal intending to capture the city. The Duc de Lévis, commander of French forces in North America, ordered Captain Pierre Pouchot of the Régiment de Béarn to delay Amherst's approaching army for as long as he could. Pouchot ordered the evacuation of the nearby Fort de La Présentation and Pointe aux Baril due to their susceptibility to Amherst's guns and set up his defense of the area at Fort Lévis. Pouchot had a garrison of 340 regulars of the Compagnies Franches de la Marine and Canadian militiamen. On 20 August 1760, Amherst sent his naval vessels to bombard the island. Guns were landed on nearby shorelines and islands to enfilade the fort. By 24 August, Pouchot was out of ammunition and surrendered to Amherst. Amherst then renamed the fort to Fort William Augustus after the given names of the Duke of Cumberland who was head of the British Army at the time. Amherst departed to take Montreal and the British garrison that was left behind set about rebuilding the fort. The fort was abandoned by the British in 1766.

The island, Chimney Island (or Isle Royale), on which the fort stood was partially destroyed during the construction of the St. Lawrence Seaway in the 1950s. The submerged location is near Ogdensburg, New York.
