= Béarn Regiment =

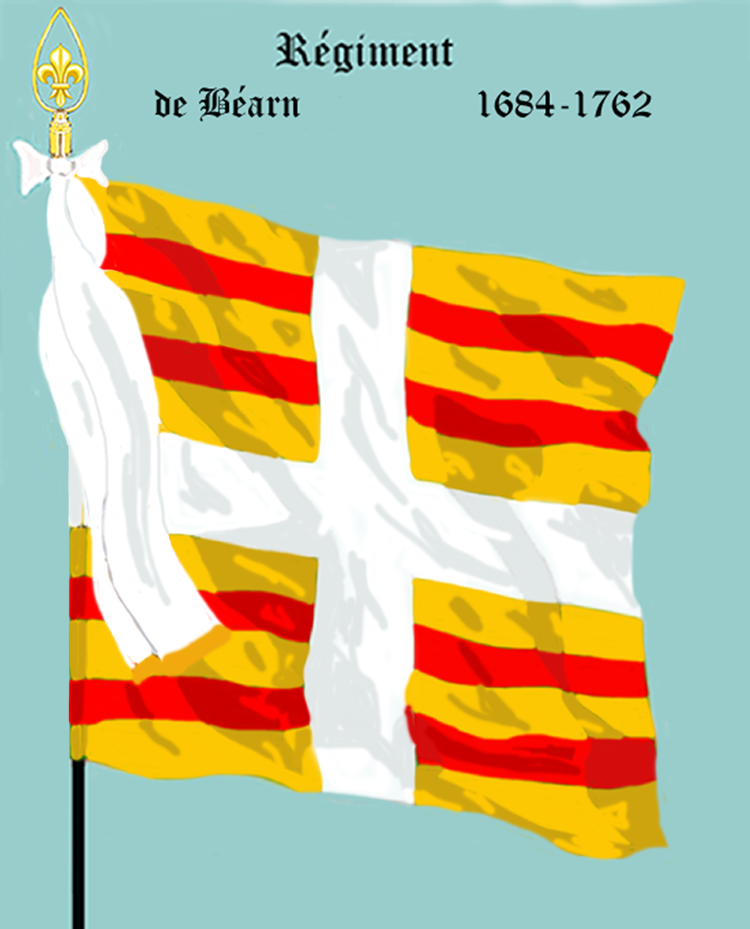
Regimental colours of the Régiment de Béarn (1684-1762)

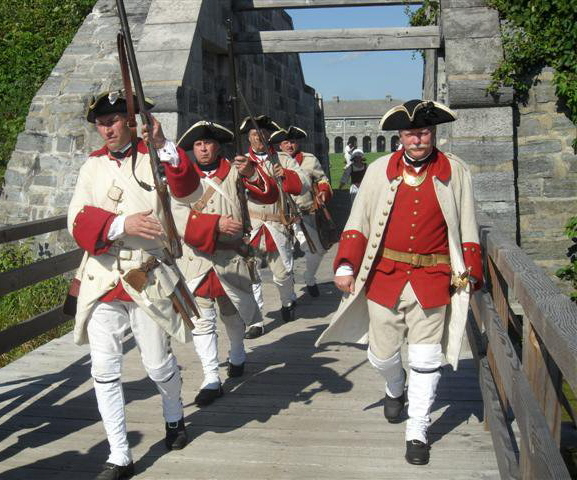
Reenactors in the uniform of the Régiment de Béarn (Fort Lennox, Saint-Paul-de-l'Île-aux-Noix, 2011)

The Régiment de Béarn was a French Army regiment active in the 18th century. It is principally known for its role in the Seven Years' War, when it served in the North American theatre.

== History ==
The regiment was recruited from the Béarn province of France. The regiment arrived in June 1755 in New France. The regiment was sent at the beginning of July to Fort Frontenac and one year later participated in the victory against Fort Oswego, in company of other regiments and Indians. After the defeat of the British on August 14 at Oswego, one company of the regiment is sent to Fort Bull and the other to Fort William Henry. In 1758, the regiment participated in the defense of Fort Carillon. On July 31, 1759, the battalion took part in the victorious battle of Beauport where it guarded the extreme left near the cataract of the Montmorency River with the grenadiers. On September 13, 1759, they were present during the siege of Quebec City, with the exception of 35 soldiers who were sent to Fort Niagara. After the battle, the regiment followed the French army in its retreat towards the Jacques-Cartier River. On October 28, the piquets and grenadiers of the regiment retired from Pointe-aux-Trembles (modern Neuville). In November, the regiment took its winter quarters on the island of Montréal. The regiment took part at the Battle of Sainte-Foy the following year.

== See also ==
- Military of New France
