= Pierre Pouchot =

French army officer (1712–1769)

Captain Pierre Pouchot (April 8, 1712 – 1769) was a French military engineer and officer in the French regular army.

He was born at Grenoble, Dauphiné, France, son of a merchant. In 1733 he joined the regular army as a volunteer engineer and on May 1, 1734, was appointed a second lieutenant in the Regiment de Bearn. He later served in Italy, Flanders, and Germany and became an assistant adjutant within ten years. In the War of the Austrian Succession his engineering service won distinction and he received the Cross of the Order of St. Louis and in September, 1748 a Captain's commission.

In 1754 during the French and Indian War his regiment was selected for service in Canada. He arrived at Fort Frontenac in July, 1755 and then was sent to Fort Niagara to improve its defenses.

In July and August, 1756 he assisting in laying out the siege works in the Battle of Fort Oswego.

After came construction in Montreal, then Fort Ticonderoga and Fort Frontenac. He was then given command of Fort Niagara which he enlarged and provided with new earthwork defences (he was also based briefly at Fort Rouillé in 1757, a settlement that eventually ended in British hands and is now known as Toronto). In October 1757, he was removed from his command at Fort Niagara and rejoined his regiment in Montreal. He was dispatched again as commander of Fort Niagara in March, 1759.

In July 1759 a joint British and Iroquois force commanded by General John Prideaux and William Johnson laid siege to Fort Niagara. After a relief force from Fort Machault under the command of Captain François-Marie Le Marchand de Lignery was routed by the besiegers at La Belle Famille on 25 July, Pouchot was obliged to surrender the fort to Johnson.

He died in May, 1769 on Corsica as a military engineer.
