= United States Declaration of Independence =

1776 American national founding document

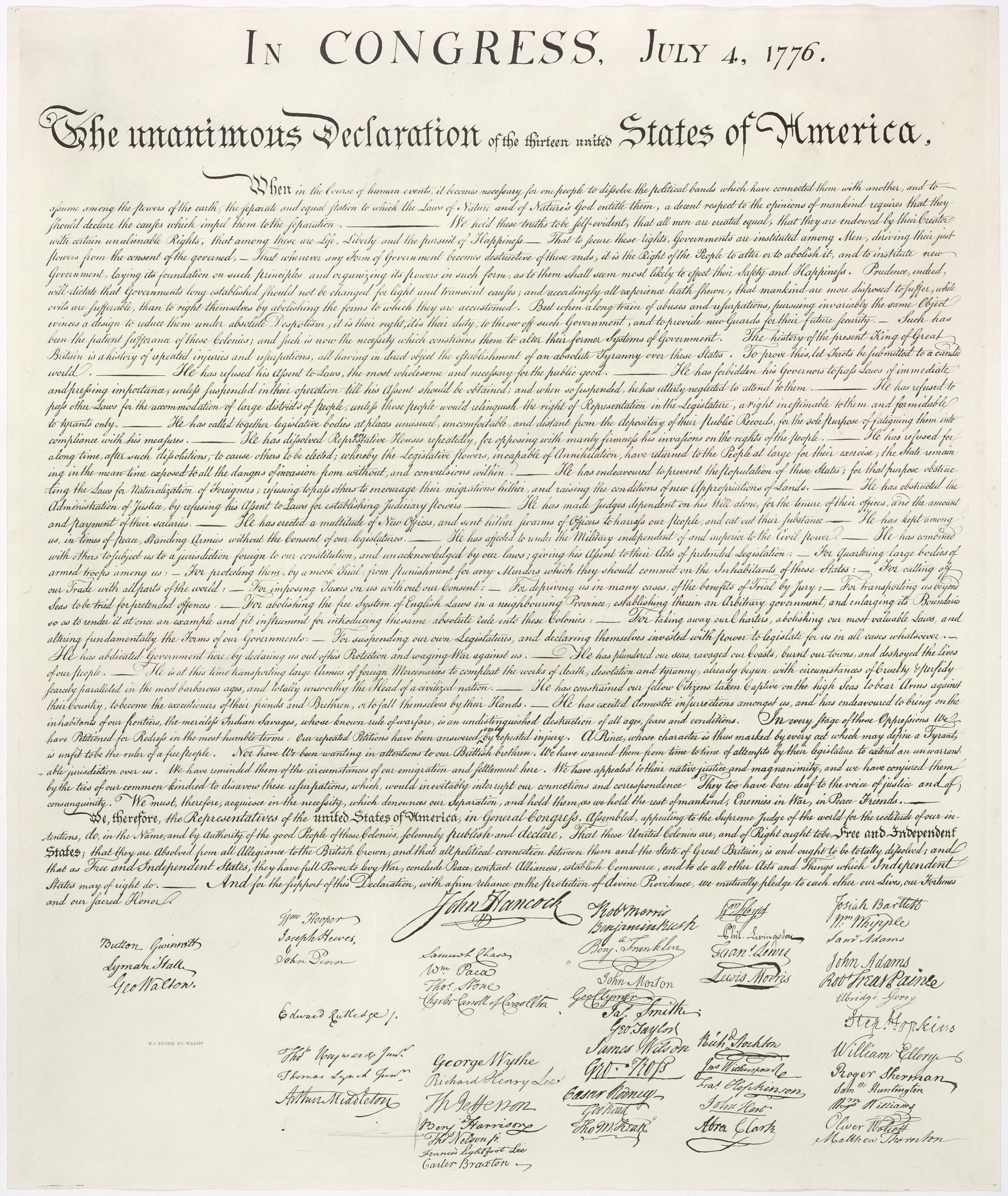
- The 1823 facsimile of Timothy Matlack's engrossed copy of the Declaration of Independence
- Created: June–July 1776
- Ratified: July 4, 1776; 250 years ago
- Location: Engrossed copy: National Archives Building; Rough draft: Library of Congress
- Author(s): Thomas Jefferson, Committee of Five
- Signatories: 56 delegates to the Second Continental Congress
- Purpose: To announce and explain separation from Great Britain

Full text
- United States Declaration of Independence at Wikisource

The Declaration of Independence, headed The unanimous Declaration of the thirteen united States of America on the document directed to be engrossed by Congress on July 19, 1776, is the founding document of the United States. On July 4, 1776, it was adopted unanimously by the Second Continental Congress, who were convened at the Pennsylvania State House, later renamed Independence Hall, in Philadelphia. These delegates became known as the nation's Founding Fathers. The Declaration explains why the Thirteen Colonies regarded themselves as independent sovereign states no longer subject to British colonial rule, and has become one of the most circulated, reprinted, and influential documents in history.

The American Revolutionary War commenced in April 1775 with the Battles of Lexington and Concord. Amid the growing tensions, delegates of the several colonies reconvened the Continental Congress on May 10 at Philadelphia. The British monarch, King George III, proclaimed them to be in rebellion on August 23, 1775.

On June 11, 1776, Congress appointed the Committee of Five (John Adams, Benjamin Franklin, Thomas Jefferson, Robert R. Livingston, and Roger Sherman) to draft and present the Declaration. Adams, a leading proponent of independence, persuaded the committee to charge Jefferson with writing the document's original draft, which the Congress then edited. Jefferson largely wrote the Declaration between June 11 and 28, 1776. The Declaration presented the political, moral, and legal justifications for independence from the Kingdom of Great Britain. Two days prior to the Declaration's adoption, Congress passed the Lee Resolution, which resolved that the British no longer had governing authority over the Thirteen Colonies. The Declaration justified the independence of the colonies, citing 27 colonial grievances against the king and asserting certain natural and legal rights, including a right of revolution.

The Declaration was unanimously ratified on July 4 by the Second Continental Congress, whose delegates represented the Thirteen Colonies. In ratifying and signing it, the delegates knew they were committing an act of high treason against the Crown, which was punishable by torture and death. Two days following its ratification, on July 6, it was published by The Pennsylvania Evening Post. The first public readings of the Declaration occurred simultaneously on July 8, 1776, at noon at three previously designated locations: Trenton, New Jersey; Easton, Pennsylvania; and Philadelphia.

The Declaration was published in several forms. The printed Dunlap broadside was widely distributed following the Declaration's signing, and two original copies are now preserved in the Library of Congress in Washington, D.C. The signed copy of the Declaration is on display at the National Archives in Washington, D.C., and is generally considered the official document; this copy, engrossed (hand written) by Timothy Matlack, was ordered by Congress on July 19, and signed primarily on August 2, 1776.

The Declaration has proven an influential and globally impactful statement on human rights. It was viewed by Abraham Lincoln as the moral standard to which the United States should strive, and he considered it a statement of principles through which the Constitution should be interpreted. In 1863, Lincoln made the Declaration the centerpiece of his Gettysburg Address, widely considered among the most famous speeches in American history. The Declaration's second sentence—"We hold these truths to be self-evident, that all men are created equal, that they are endowed by their Creator with certain unalienable Rights, that among these are Life, Liberty and the pursuit of Happiness"—is considered one of the most significant and famed lines in world history. Pulitzer Prize-winning historian Joseph Ellis has written that these words are "the most potent and consequential words in American history".

== Background ==
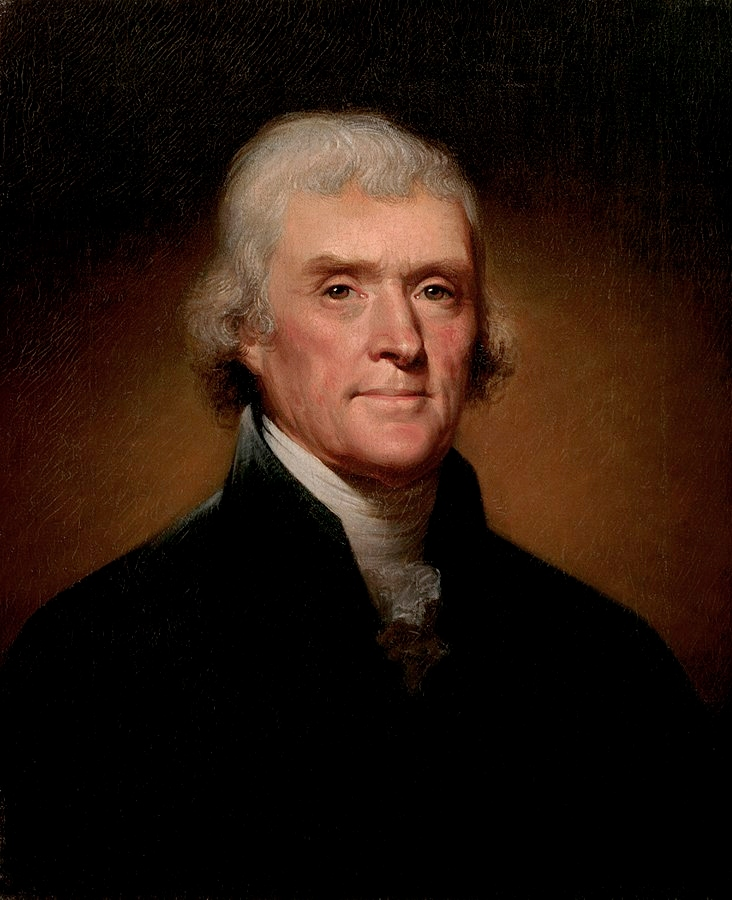
Thomas Jefferson, the principal author of the Declaration

Believe me, dear Sir: there is not in the British empire a man who more cordially loves a union with Great Britain than I do. But, by the God that made me, I will cease to exist before I yield to a connection on such terms as the British Parliament propose; and in this, I think I speak the sentiments of America.

— Thomas Jefferson, November 29, 1775

By the time the Declaration of Independence was adopted in July 1776, the Thirteen Colonies and Kingdom of Great Britain had been at war for over a year. Relations had been deteriorating between the colonies and the mother country since 1763. In 1767, Parliament enacted a series of measures designed to increase revenue from the colonies, including the Stamp Act of 1765 and the Townshend Acts, which it believed were a legitimate means of having the colonies pay their fair share of the costs of remaining a part of the British Empire.

In the Thirteen Colonies, however, perspectives varied on the British Empire. The colonies were not directly represented in Parliament, and colonists argued that Parliament had no right to levy taxes upon them. This tax dispute was part of a larger divergence between British and American interpretations of the British Constitution and the extent of Parliament's authority in the colonies. The orthodox British view, dating from the Glorious Revolution of 1688, was that Parliament was the supreme authority throughout the empire, and anything that Parliament did was constitutional. In the colonies, however, the idea had developed that the British Constitution recognized certain fundamental rights that no government could violate, including Parliament. After the Townshend Acts, some essayists questioned whether Parliament had any legitimate jurisdiction in the colonies. As a result of this ideological shift in the colonies, many colonialists participated in tax protests against the Royal authority such as the Pine Tree Riot in 1772 and the Boston Tea Party in 1773.

Anticipating the arrangement of the British Commonwealth, by 1774 American writers such as Samuel Adams, James Wilson, and Thomas Jefferson argued that Parliament was the legislature of Great Britain only, and that the colonies, which had their own legislatures, were connected to the rest of the empire only through their allegiance to the Crown. (Note: The writings in question include Wilson's Considerations on the Authority of Parliament and Jefferson's A Summary View of the Rights of British America (both 1774), as well as Samuel Adams's 1768 Circular Letter.)

=== Continental Congress convenes ===
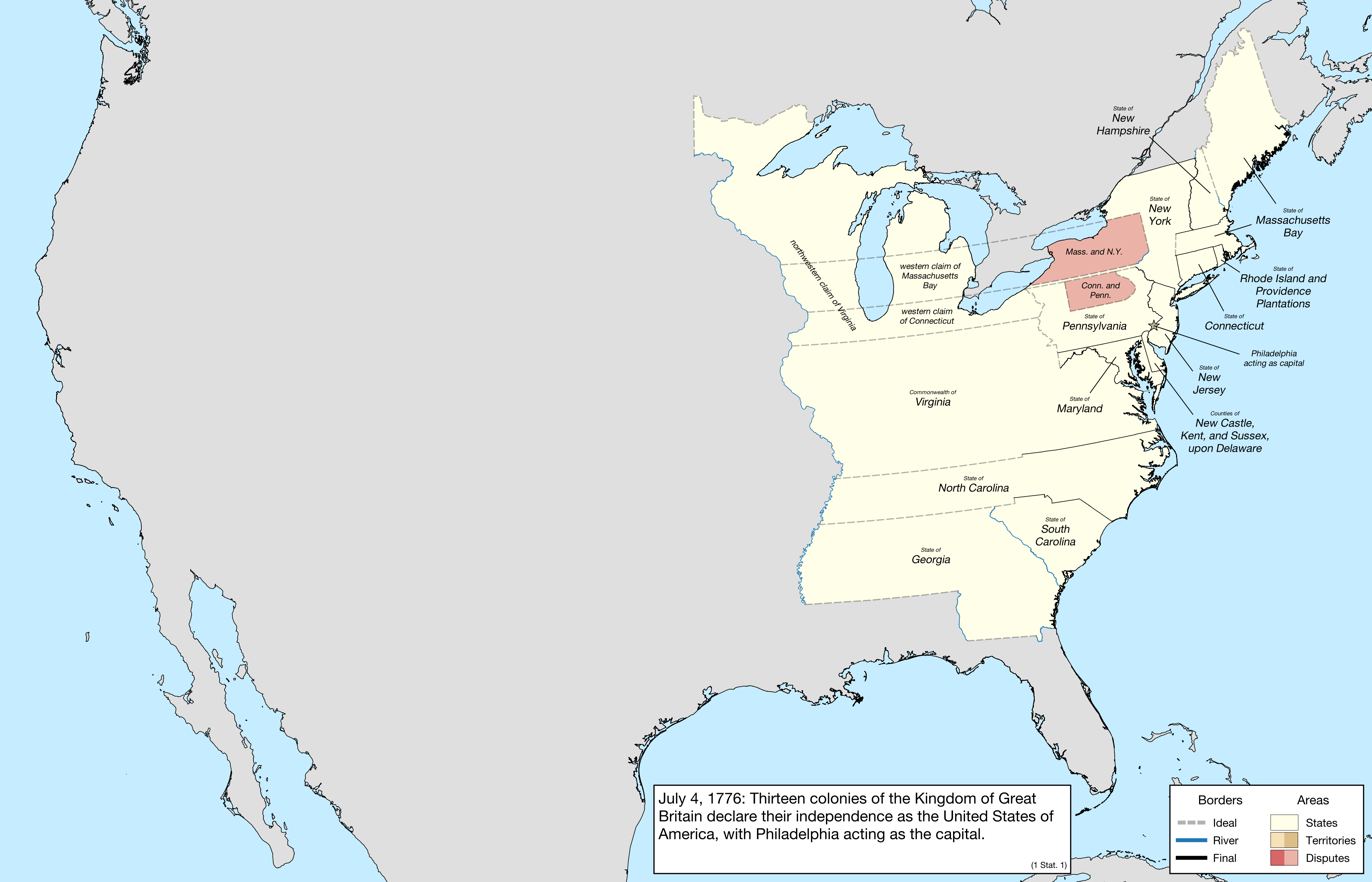
The Thirteen Colonies as they existed on July 4, 1776, when the Second Continental Congress unanimously approved the text of the Declaration of Independence. (Most border disputes omitted; territory between the Proclamation Line of 1763 and the Mississippi River was part of Quebec and land reserved for Native Americans until the 1783 Treaty of Paris. Some colonies had already declared independence; see Territorial evolution of the United States § 1776–1784 (American Revolution).)

In 1774, Parliament passed the Coercive Acts, known as the Intolerable Acts in the colonies. This was intended to punish the colonists for the Gaspee Affair of 1772 and the Boston Tea Party of 1773. Many colonists considered the Coercive Acts to be in violation of the British Constitution and a threat to the liberties of all of British America. In September 1774, the First Continental Congress convened in Philadelphia to coordinate a formal response. Congress organized a boycott of British goods and petitioned the king for repeal of the acts. These measures were unsuccessful, however, since King George and His Majesty's prime minister, Lord North, were determined to enforce parliamentary supremacy over the Thirteen Colonies. In November 1774, King George, in a letter to North, wrote, "blows must decide whether they are to be subject to this country or independent".

Most colonists still hoped for reconciliation with Great Britain, even after fighting began in the American Revolutionary War at Lexington and Concord in April 1775. The Second Continental Congress convened at Pennsylvania State House, later renamed Independence Hall, in Philadelphia in May 1775. Some delegates supported eventual independence for the colonies, but none had yet declared it publicly, which was an act of treason punishable by death under the laws of the British monarchy at the time.

Many colonists believed that Parliament no longer had sovereignty over them, but they were still loyal to King George, thinking he would intercede on their behalf. They were disabused of that notion in late 1775, when the king rejected Congress's second petition, issued a Proclamation of Rebellion, and announced before Parliament on October 26 that he was considering "friendly offers of foreign assistance" to suppress the rebellion. A pro-American minority in Parliament warned that the government was driving the colonists toward independence.

=== Growing support for independence ===
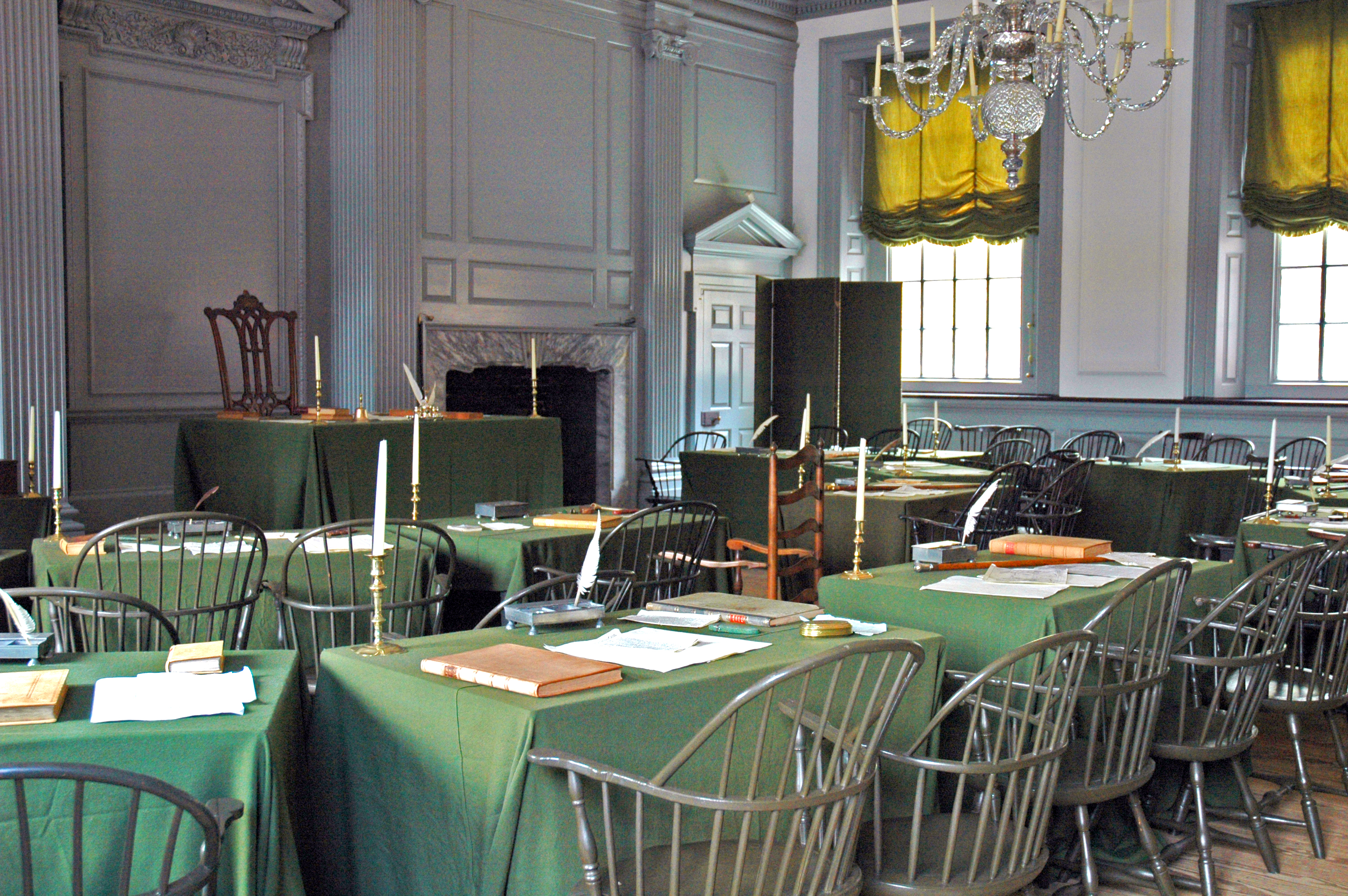
The Assembly Room in Independence Hall in Philadelphia, where the Second Continental Congress unanimously adopted the Declaration of Independence

Despite this growing popular support for independence, the Second Continental Congress initially lacked the clear authority to declare it. Delegates had been elected to Congress by 13 different governments, which included extralegal conventions, ad hoc committees, and elected assemblies, and they were bound by the instructions given to them. Regardless of their personal opinions, delegates could not vote to declare independence unless their instructions permitted such an action. Several colonies, in fact, expressly prohibited their delegates from taking any steps toward separation from Great Britain, while other delegations had instructions that were ambiguous on the issue; consequently, advocates of independence sought to have the Congressional instructions revised. For Congress to declare independence, a majority of delegations would need authorization to vote for it, and at least one colonial government would need to specifically instruct its delegation to propose a declaration of independence in Congress.

Between April and July 1776, a "complex political war" was waged to bring this about.

In January 1776, Thomas Paine's pamphlet Common Sense, which described the uphill battle against the British for independence as a challenging but achievable and necessary objective, was published in Philadelphia. Common Sense made a persuasive, impassioned case for independence, which had not been given serious consideration in the colonies. Paine linked independence with Protestant beliefs, as a means to present a distinctly American political identity, and he initiated open debate on a topic few had dared to discuss.

As Common Sense was circulated throughout the Thirteen Colonies, public support for independence from Great Britain steadily increased. After reading it, Washington ordered that it be read by his Continental Army troops, who were demoralized following recent military defeats. A week later, Washington led the crossing of the Delaware in one of the Revolutionary War's most complex and daring military campaigns, resulting in a much-needed military victory in the Battle of Trenton against a Hessian military garrison at Trenton. Common Sense was sold and distributed widely and read aloud at taverns and meeting places. In proportion to the population of the colonies at that time (2.5 million), it had the largest sale and circulation of any book published in American history. As of 2006, it remains the all-time best-selling American title and is still in print today.

In December 1776, Paine followed up with The American Crisis, in which he wrote the famed phrase:

These are the times that try men's souls; the summer soldier and the sunshine patriot will, in this crisis, shrink from the service of his country; but he that stands it now, deserves the love and thanks of man and woman. Tyranny, like hell, is not easily conquered; yet we have this consolation with us, that the harder the conflict, the more glorious the triumph.

— Thomas Paine, The American Crisis

While some colonists still hoped for reconciliation, public support for independence strengthened considerably in early 1776. In February 1776, colonists learned of Parliament's passage of the Prohibitory Act, which established a blockade of American ports and declared American ships to be enemy vessels. John Adams, a strong supporter of independence, believed that Parliament had effectively declared American independence before Congress had been able to. Adams labeled the Prohibitory Act the "Act of Independency", calling it "a compleat Dismemberment of the British Empire". Support for declaring independence grew even more when it was confirmed that King George had hired German mercenaries to use against his American subjects.

=== Revising instructions ===
In the campaign to revise Congressional instructions, many Americans formally expressed their support for separation from Great Britain in what were effectively state and local declarations of independence. Historian Pauline Maier identifies more than ninety such declarations that were issued throughout the Thirteen Colonies from April to July 1776. These "declarations" took a variety of forms. Some were formal written instructions for Congressional delegations, such as the Halifax Resolves of April 12, with which North Carolina became the first colony to explicitly authorize its delegates to vote for independence. Others were legislative acts that officially ended British rule in individual colonies, such as the Rhode Island legislature renouncing its allegiance to Great Britain on May 4—the first colony to do so. Many declarations were resolutions adopted at town or county meetings that offered support for independence. A few came in the form of jury instructions, such as the statement issued on April 23, 1776, by Chief Justice William Henry Drayton of South Carolina: "the law of the land authorizes me to declare ... that George the Third, King of Great Britain ... has no authority over us, and we owe no obedience to him." Most of these declarations are now obscure, having been overshadowed by the resolution for independence, approved by Congress on July 2, and the declaration of independence, approved and printed on July 4 and signed in August. The modern scholarly consensus is that the best-known and earliest of the local declarations is most likely inauthentic, the Mecklenburg Declaration of Independence, allegedly adopted in May 1775 (a full year before other local declarations).

Some colonies held back from endorsing independence. Resistance was centered in the middle colonies of New York, New Jersey, Maryland, Pennsylvania, and Delaware. Advocates of independence saw Pennsylvania as the key; if that colony could be converted to the pro-independence cause, it was believed that the others would follow. On May 1, however, opponents of independence retained control of the Pennsylvania Assembly in a special election that had focused on the question of independence. In response, Congress passed a resolution on May 10 which had been promoted by John Adams and Richard Henry Lee, calling on colonies without a "government sufficient to the exigencies of their affairs" to adopt new governments. The resolution passed unanimously, and was even supported by Pennsylvania's John Dickinson, the leader of the anti-independence faction in Congress, who believed that it did not apply to his colony.

=== May 15 preamble ===
This Day the Congress has passed the most important Resolution, that ever was taken in America.

— John Adams, May 15, 1776

As was the custom, Congress appointed a committee to draft a preamble to explain the purpose of the resolution. John Adams wrote the preamble, which stated that because King George had rejected reconciliation and was hiring foreign mercenaries to use against the colonies, "it is necessary that the exercise of every kind of authority under the said crown should be totally suppressed". Adams' preamble was meant to encourage the overthrow of the governments of Pennsylvania and Maryland, which were still under proprietary governance. Congress passed the preamble on May 15 after several days of debate, but four of the middle colonies voted against it, and the Maryland delegation walked out in protest. Adams regarded his May 15 preamble effectively as an American declaration of independence, although a formal declaration would still have to be made.

=== Lee Resolution ===
On the same day that Congress passed Adams' preamble, the Virginia Convention set the stage for a formal Congressional declaration of independence. On May 15, the Convention instructed Virginia's congressional delegation "to propose to that respectable body to declare the United Colonies free and independent States, absolved from all allegiance to, or dependence upon, the Crown or Parliament of Great Britain". In accordance with those instructions, Richard Henry Lee of Virginia presented a three-part resolution to Congress on June 7. The motion was seconded by John Adams, calling on Congress to declare independence, form foreign alliances, and prepare a plan of colonial confederation. The part of the resolution relating to declaring independence read: "Resolved, that these United Colonies are, and of right ought to be, free and independent States, that they are absolved from all allegiance to the British Crown, and that all political connection between them and the State of Great Britain is, and ought to be, totally dissolved."

Lee's resolution met with resistance in the ensuing debate. Opponents of the resolution conceded that reconciliation was unlikely with Great Britain, while arguing that declaring independence was premature, and that securing foreign aid should take priority. Advocates of the resolution countered that foreign governments would not intervene in an internal British struggle, and so a formal declaration of independence was needed before foreign aid was possible. All Congress needed to do, they insisted, was to "declare a fact which already exists". Delegates from Pennsylvania, Delaware, New Jersey, Maryland, and New York were still not yet authorized to vote for independence, however, and some of them threatened to leave Congress if the resolution were adopted. Congress, therefore, voted on June 10 to postpone further discussion of Lee's resolution for three weeks. Until then, Congress decided that a committee should prepare a document announcing and explaining independence in case Lee's resolution was approved when it was brought up again in July.

=== Final push ===
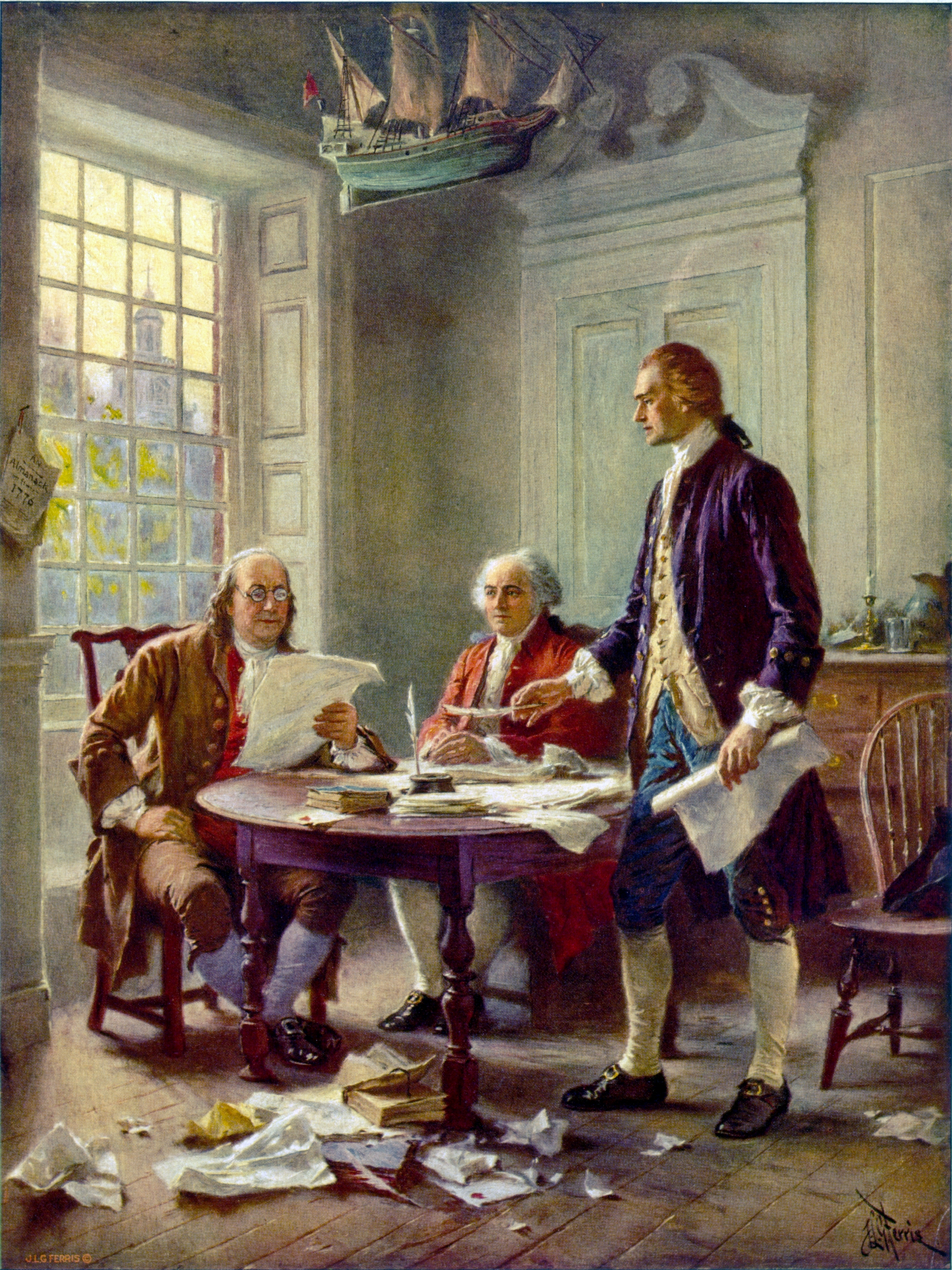
Writing the Declaration of Independence, 1776, a 1900 portrait by Jean Leon Gerome Ferris depicting Franklin, Adams, and Jefferson working on the Declaration

Support for a Congressional declaration of independence was consolidated in the final weeks of June 1776. On June 14, the Connecticut Assembly instructed its delegates to propose independence and, the following day, the legislatures of New Hampshire and Delaware authorized their delegates to declare independence. In Pennsylvania, political struggles ended with the dissolution of the colonial assembly, and a new Conference of Committees under Thomas McKean authorized Pennsylvania's delegates to declare independence on June 18. The Provincial Congress of New Jersey had been governing the province since January 1776; they resolved on June 15 that Royal Governor William Franklin was "an enemy to the liberties of this country" and had him arrested. On June 21, they chose new delegates to Congress and empowered them to join in a declaration of independence.

As of the end of June, only two of the thirteen colonies had yet to authorize independence, Maryland and New York. Maryland's delegates previously walked out when the Continental Congress adopted Adams' May 15 preamble, and had sent to the Annapolis Convention for instructions. On May 20, the Annapolis Convention rejected Adams' preamble, instructing its delegates to remain against independence. But Samuel Chase went to Maryland and, thanks to local resolutions in favor of independence, was able to get the Annapolis Convention to change its mind on June 28. Only the New York delegates were unable to get revised instructions. When Congress had been considering the resolution of independence on June 8, the New York Provincial Congress told the delegates to wait. But on June 30, the Provincial Congress evacuated New York as British forces approached, and would not convene again until July 10. This meant that New York's delegates would not be authorized to declare independence until after Congress had made its decision.

== Draft and adoption ==
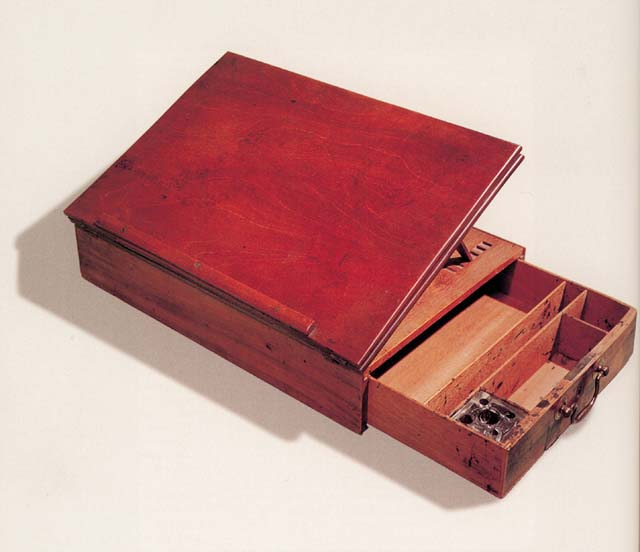
The portable writing desk on which Jefferson drafted the Declaration of Independence

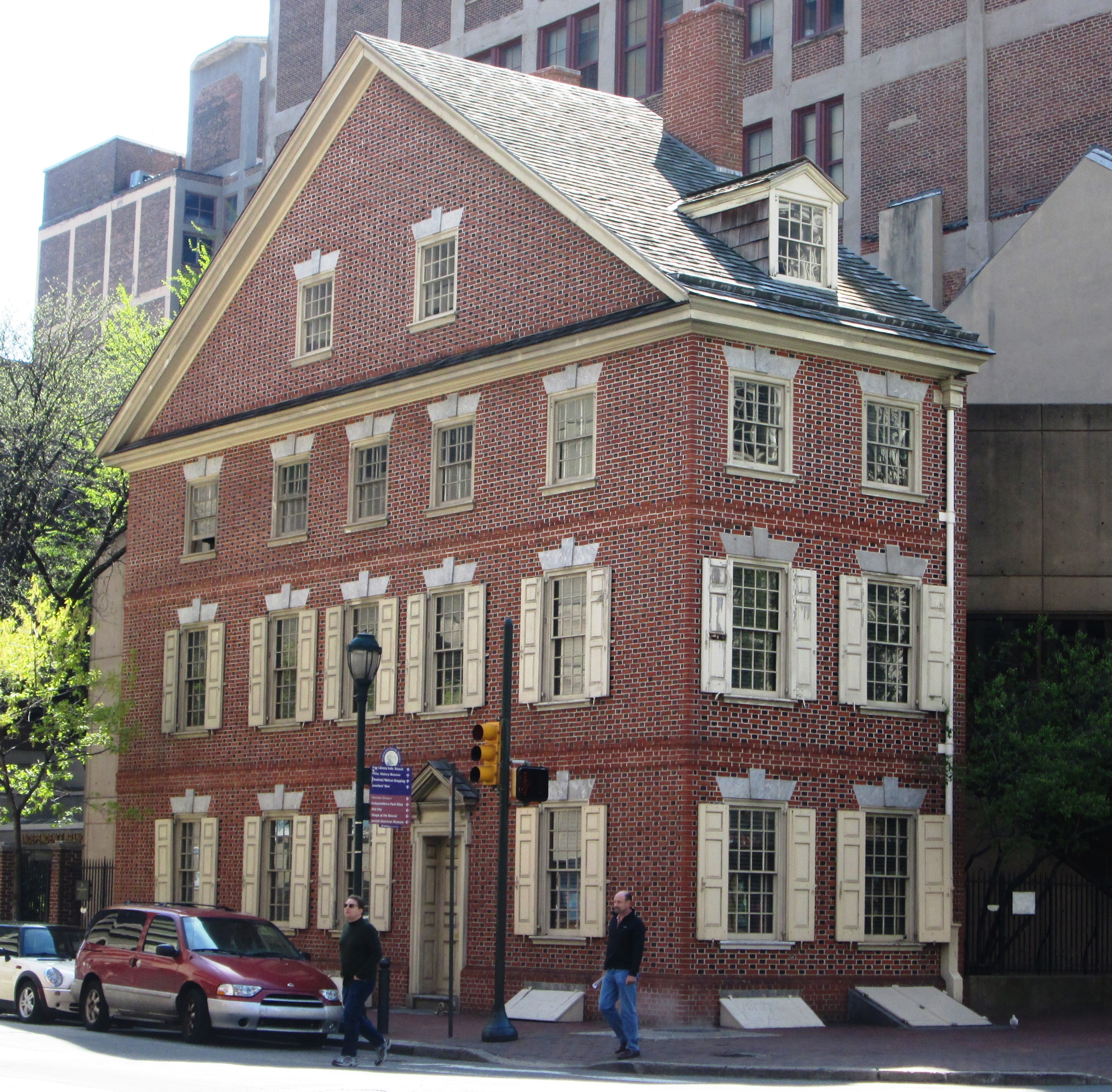
Declaration House, the reconstructed boarding house at Market and South 7th Streets in Philadelphia, where Jefferson wrote the Declaration in June 1776

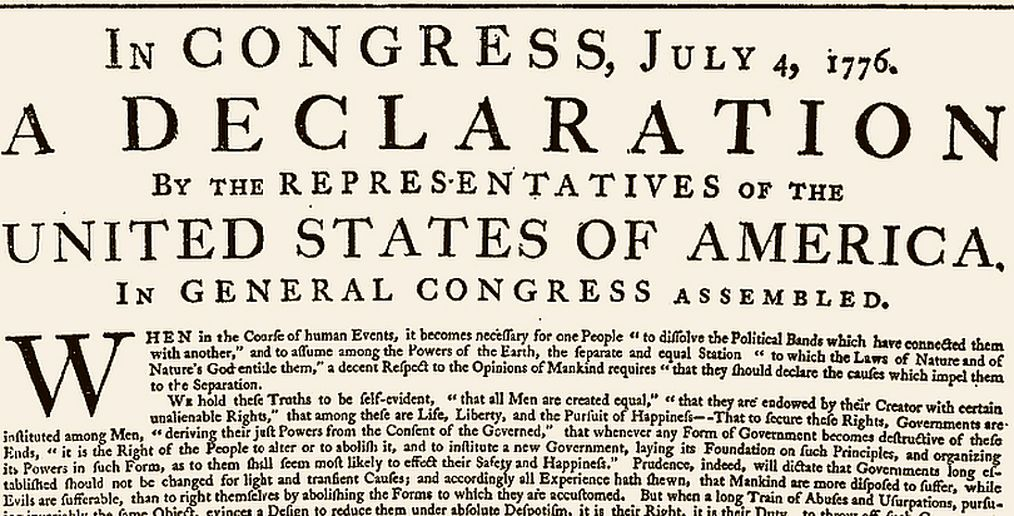
The opening of the Declaration's original printing on July 4, 1776, under Jefferson's supervision, engrossed and signed in August 1776 includes slightly edited phrasing to its opening lines, including the pointed addition of the word "unanimous", reflecting that each of the 56 delegates of the Second Continental Congress signed it.

Political maneuvering was setting the stage for an official declaration of independence even while a document was being written to explain the decision. On June 11, 1776, Congress appointed the Committee of Five to draft a declaration, including John Adams of Massachusetts, Benjamin Franklin of Pennsylvania, Thomas Jefferson of Virginia, Robert R. Livingston of New York, and Roger Sherman of Connecticut.

The committee took no minutes, so there is some uncertainty about how the drafting process proceeded; contradictory accounts were written many years later by Jefferson and Adams, too many years to be regarded as entirely reliable, although their accounts are frequently cited. What is certain is that the committee discussed the general outline which the document should follow and decided that Jefferson would write the first draft. The committee in general, and Jefferson in particular, thought that Adams should write the document, but Adams persuaded them to choose Jefferson and promised to consult with him personally.

Jefferson largely wrote the Declaration of Independence in isolation between June 11, 1776, and June 28, 1776, from the second floor of a three-story home he was renting at 700 Market Street in Philadelphia, now called the Declaration House and within walking distance of Independence Hall. Considering Congress's busy schedule, Jefferson probably had limited time for writing over these 17 days, and he likely wrote his first draft quickly.

Examination of the text of the early Declaration drafts reflects the influence that John Locke, the Enlightenment philosopher, and Thomas Paine, author of Common Sense, had on Jefferson. He then consulted the other members of the Committee of Five who offered minor changes, and then produced another copy incorporating these alterations. The committee presented this copy to the Congress on June 28, 1776. The title of the document was "A Declaration by the Representatives of the United States of America, in General Congress assembled."

Congress ordered that the draft "lie on the table" and then methodically edited Jefferson's primary document for the next two days, shortening it by a fourth, removing unnecessary wording, and improving sentence structure. They removed Jefferson's assertion that King George III had forced slavery onto the colonies, in order to moderate the document and appease those in South Carolina and Georgia, both states which had significant involvement in the slave trade.

Jefferson later wrote in his autobiography that Northern states were also supportive towards the clause's removal, "for though their people had very few slaves themselves, yet they had been pretty considerable carriers of them to others." Jefferson wrote that Congress had "mangled" his draft version, but the Declaration that was finally produced was "the majestic document that inspired both contemporaries and posterity", in the words of his biographer John Ferling.

Congress tabled the draft of the declaration on Monday, July 1, and resolved itself into a committee of the whole, with Benjamin Harrison of Virginia presiding, and they resumed debate on Lee's resolution of independence. John Dickinson made one last effort to delay the decision, arguing that Congress should not declare independence without first securing a foreign alliance and finalizing the Articles of Confederation. John Adams gave a speech in reply to Dickinson, restating the case for an immediate declaration.

A vote was taken after a long day of speeches, each colony casting a single vote, as always. The delegation for each colony numbered from two to seven members, and each delegation voted among themselves to determine the colony's vote. Pennsylvania and South Carolina voted against declaring independence. The New York delegation abstained, lacking permission to vote for independence. Delaware cast no vote because the delegation was split between Thomas McKean, who voted yes, and George Read, who voted no. The remaining nine delegations voted in favor of independence, which meant that the resolution had been approved by the committee of the whole. The next step was for the resolution to be voted upon by Congress itself. Edward Rutledge of South Carolina was opposed to Lee's resolution but desirous of unanimity, and he moved that the vote be postponed until the following day.

On July 2, South Carolina reversed its position and voted for independence. In the Pennsylvania delegation, Dickinson and Robert Morris abstained, allowing the delegation to vote three-to-two in favor of independence. The tie in the Delaware delegation was broken by the timely arrival of Caesar Rodney, who voted for independence. The New York delegation abstained once again since they were still not authorized to vote for independence, although they were allowed to do so a week later by the New York Provincial Congress. The resolution of independence was adopted with twelve affirmative votes and one abstention, and the colonies formally severed political ties with Great Britain. John Adams wrote to his wife on the following day and predicted that July 2 would become a great American holiday. He thought that the vote for independence would be commemorated; he did not foresee that Americans would instead celebrate Independence Day on the date when the announcement of that act was finalized.

I am apt to believe that [Independence Day] will be celebrated, by succeeding Generations, as the great anniversary Festival. It ought to be commemorated, as the Day of Deliverance by solemn Acts of Devotion to God Almighty. It ought to be solemnized with Pomp and Parade, with shews, Games, Sports, Guns, Bells, Bonfires and Illuminations from one End of this Continent to the other from this Time forward forever more.

Congress next turned its attention to the committee's draft of the declaration. They made significant changes in wording during several days of debate including the removal of nearly a fourth of the text. The final wording of the Declaration of Independence was approved on July 4, 1776, and sent to the printer for publication.

There is a distinct change in wording from this original broadside printing of the Declaration and the final official engrossed copy. The word "unanimous" was inserted as a result of a Congressional resolution passed on July 19, 1776: "Resolved, That the Declaration passed on the 4th, be fairly engrossed on parchment, with the title and stile of 'The unanimous declaration of the thirteen United States of America,' and that the same, when engrossed, be signed by every member of Congress."

== Annotated text of the engrossed declaration ==
The declaration is not divided into formal sections; but it is often discussed as consisting of five parts: introduction, preamble, indictment of King George III, denunciation of the British people, and conclusion.

Introduction Asserts as a matter of natural law the ability of a people to assume political independence; acknowledges that the grounds for such independence must be reasonable, and therefore explicable, and ought to be explained.	In CONGRESS, July 4, 1776. The unanimous Declaration of the thirteen united States of America, "When in the Course of human events, it becomes necessary for one people to dissolve the political bands which have connected them with another, and to assume among the powers of the earth, the separate and equal station to which the Laws of Nature and of Nature's God entitle them, a decent respect to the opinions of mankind requires that they should declare the causes which impel them to the separation."
Preamble Outlines a general philosophy of government that justifies revolution when government harms natural rights.	"We hold these truths to be self-evident, that all men are created equal, that they are endowed by their Creator with certain unalienable Rights, that among these are Life, Liberty and the pursuit of Happiness.—That to secure these rights, Governments are instituted among Men, deriving their just powers from the consent of the governed,—That whenever any Form of Government becomes destructive of these ends, it is the Right of the People to alter or to abolish it, and to institute new Government, laying its foundation on such principles and organizing its powers in such form, as to them shall seem most likely to effect their Safety and Happiness. Prudence, indeed, will dictate that Governments long established should not be changed for light and transient causes; and accordingly all experience hath shewn, that mankind are more disposed to suffer, while evils are sufferable, than to right themselves by abolishing the forms to which they are accustomed. But when a long train of abuses and usurpations, pursuing invariably the same Object evinces a design to reduce them under absolute Despotism, it is their right, it is their duty, to throw off such Government, and to provide new Guards for their future security."
Indictment A bill of grievances documenting the king's "repeated injuries and usurpations" of the Americans' rights and liberties.	"Such has been the patient sufferance of these Colonies; and such is now the necessity which constrains them to alter their former Systems of Government. The history of the present King of Great Britain is a history of repeated injuries and usurpations, all having in direct object the establishment of an absolute Tyranny over these States. To prove this, let Facts be submitted to a candid world. "He has refused his Assent to Laws, the most wholesome and necessary for the public good. "He has forbidden his Governors to pass Laws of immediate and pressing importance, unless suspended in their operation till his Assent should be obtained; and when so suspended, he has utterly neglected to attend to them. "He has refused to pass other Laws for the accommodation of large districts of people, unless those people would relinquish the right of Representation in the Legislature, a right inestimable to them and formidable to tyrants only. "He has called together legislative bodies at places unusual, uncomfortable, and distant from the depository of their Public Records, for the sole purpose of fatiguing them into compliance with his measures. "He has dissolved Representative Houses repeatedly, for opposing with manly firmness his invasions on the rights of the people. "He has refused for a long time, after such dissolutions, to cause others to be elected, whereby the Legislative Powers, incapable of Annihilation, have returned to the People at large for their exercise; the State remaining in the meantime exposed to all the dangers of invasion from without, and convulsions within. "He has endeavoured to prevent the population of these States; for that purpose obstructing the Laws for Naturalization of Foreigners; refusing to pass others to encourage their migrations hither, and raising the conditions of new Appropriations of Lands. "He has obstructed the Administration of Justice by refusing his Assent to Laws for establishing Judiciary Powers. "He has made Judges dependent on his Will alone for the tenure of their offices, and the amount and payment of their salaries. "He has erected a multitude of New Offices, and sent hither swarms of Officers to harass our people and eat out their substance. "He has kept among us, in times of peace, Standing Armies without the Consent of our legislatures. "He has affected to render the Military independent of and superior to the Civil Power. "He has combined with others to subject us to a jurisdiction foreign to our constitution, and unacknowledged by our laws; giving his Assent to their Acts of pretended Legislation: "For quartering large bodies of armed troops among us: "For protecting them, by a mock Trial from punishment for any Murders which they should commit on the Inhabitants of these States: "For cutting off our Trade with all parts of the world: "For imposing Taxes on us without our Consent: "For depriving us in many cases, of the benefit of Trial by Jury: "For transporting us beyond Seas to be tried for pretended offences: "For abolishing the free System of English Laws in a neighbouring Province, establishing therein an Arbitrary government, and enlarging its Boundaries so as to render it at once an example and fit instrument for introducing the same absolute rule into these Colonies: "For taking away our Charters, abolishing our most valuable Laws and altering fundamentally the Forms of our Governments: "For suspending our own Legislatures, and declaring themselves invested with power to legislate for us in all cases whatsoever. "He has abdicated Government here, by declaring us out of his Protection and waging War against us. "He has plundered our seas, ravaged our coasts, burnt our towns, and destroyed the lives of our people. "He is at this time transporting large Armies of foreign Mercenaries to compleat the works of death, desolation, and tyranny, already begun with circumstances of Cruelty & Perfidy scarcely paralleled in the most barbarous ages, and totally unworthy the Head of a civilized nation. "He has constrained our fellow Citizens taken Captive on the high Seas to bear Arms against their Country, to become the executioners of their friends and Brethren, or to fall themselves by their Hands. "He has excited domestic insurrections amongst us, and has endeavoured to bring on the inhabitants of our frontiers, the merciless Indian Savages whose known rule of warfare, is an undistinguished destruction of all ages, sexes and conditions. "In every stage of these Oppressions We have Petitioned for Redress in the most humble terms: Our repeated Petitions have been answered only by repeated injury. A Prince, whose character is thus marked by every act which may define a Tyrant, is unfit to be the ruler of a free people."
Failed warnings Describes the colonists' attempts to inform and warn the British people of the king's injustice, and the British people's failure to act. Even so, it affirms the colonists' ties to the British as "brethren."	"Nor have We been wanting in attentions to our British brethren. We have warned them from time to time of attempts by their legislature to extend an unwarrantable jurisdiction over us. We have reminded them of the circumstances of our emigration and settlement here. We have appealed to their native justice and magnanimity, and we have conjured them by the ties of our common kindred to disavow these usurpations, which, would inevitably interrupt our connections and correspondence. They too have been deaf to the voice of justice and of consanguinity."
Denunciation This section essentially finishes the case for independence. The conditions that justified revolution have been shown.	"We must, therefore, acquiesce in the necessity, which denounces our Separation, and hold them, as we hold the rest of mankind, Enemies in War, in Peace Friends."
Conclusion The signers assert that there exist conditions under which people must change their government, that the British have produced such conditions and, by necessity, the colonies must throw off political ties with the British Crown and become independent states. The conclusion contains, at its core, the Lee Resolution that had been passed on July 2.	"We, therefore, the Representatives of the united States of America, in General Congress, Assembled, appealing to the Supreme Judge of the world for the rectitude of our intentions, do, in the Name, and by Authority of the good People of these Colonies, solemnly publish and declare, That these United Colonies are, and of Right ought to be Free and Independent States; that they are Absolved from all Allegiance to the British Crown, and that all political connection between them and the State of Great Britain, is and ought to be totally dissolved; and that as Free and Independent States, they have full Power to levy War, conclude Peace, contract Alliances, establish Commerce, and to do all other Acts and Things which Independent States may of right do. And for the support of this Declaration, with a firm reliance on the protection of divine Providence, we mutually pledge to each other our Lives, our Fortunes and our sacred Honor."
Signatures The first and most famous signature on the engrossed copy was that of John Hancock, President of the Continental Congress. Two future presidents (Thomas Jefferson and John Adams) and a father and great-grandfather of two other presidents (Benjamin Harrison V) were among the signatories. Edward Rutledge (age 26) was the youngest signer, and Benjamin Franklin (age 70) was the oldest signer. The fifty-six signers of the Declaration represented the new states as follows (from north to south):	New Hampshire: Josiah Bartlett, William Whipple, Matthew Thornton; Massachusetts: Samuel Adams, John Adams, John Hancock, Robert Treat Paine, Elbridge Gerry; Rhode Island: Stephen Hopkins, William Ellery; Connecticut: Roger Sherman, Samuel Huntington, William Williams, Oliver Wolcott; New York: William Floyd, Philip Livingston, Francis Lewis, Lewis Morris; New Jersey: Richard Stockton, John Witherspoon, Francis Hopkinson, John Hart, Abraham Clark; Pennsylvania: Robert Morris, Benjamin Rush, Benjamin Franklin, John Morton, George Clymer, James Smith, George Taylor, James Wilson, George Ross; Delaware: George Read, Caesar Rodney, Thomas McKean; Maryland: Samuel Chase, William Paca, Thomas Stone, Charles Carroll of Carrollton; Virginia: George Wythe, Richard Henry Lee, Thomas Jefferson, Benjamin Harrison, Thomas Nelson Jr., Francis Lightfoot Lee, Carter Braxton; North Carolina: William Hooper, Joseph Hewes, John Penn; South Carolina: Edward Rutledge, Thomas Heyward Jr., Thomas Lynch Jr., Arthur Middleton; Georgia: Button Gwinnett, Lyman Hall, George Walton

The printed versions of the signed document known as the Goddard Broadsides include the printed names of signers of the Declaration as well as publisher Mary Katherine Goddard's name. Her name was printed at the bottom of the document. Goddard was the postmaster of Baltimore and was tasked by the Continental Congress in 1777 with printing copies of the signed Declaration. Her normal signature, in her capacity as the owner of the Maryland Journal, was "M.K. Goddard," but her full name appears on the Declaration of Independence.

== Reverse ==
"Original Declaration of Independence, dated 4th July 1776" is written along the edge on the back, which served as identification of the document when it was rolled up and stored. (Note: This information can be found in the United States National Archives at the following: "The Declaration of Independence - The Declaration of Independence (back)". National Archives and Records Administration. Archived from the original on July 22, 2025.)

== Influences and legal status ==
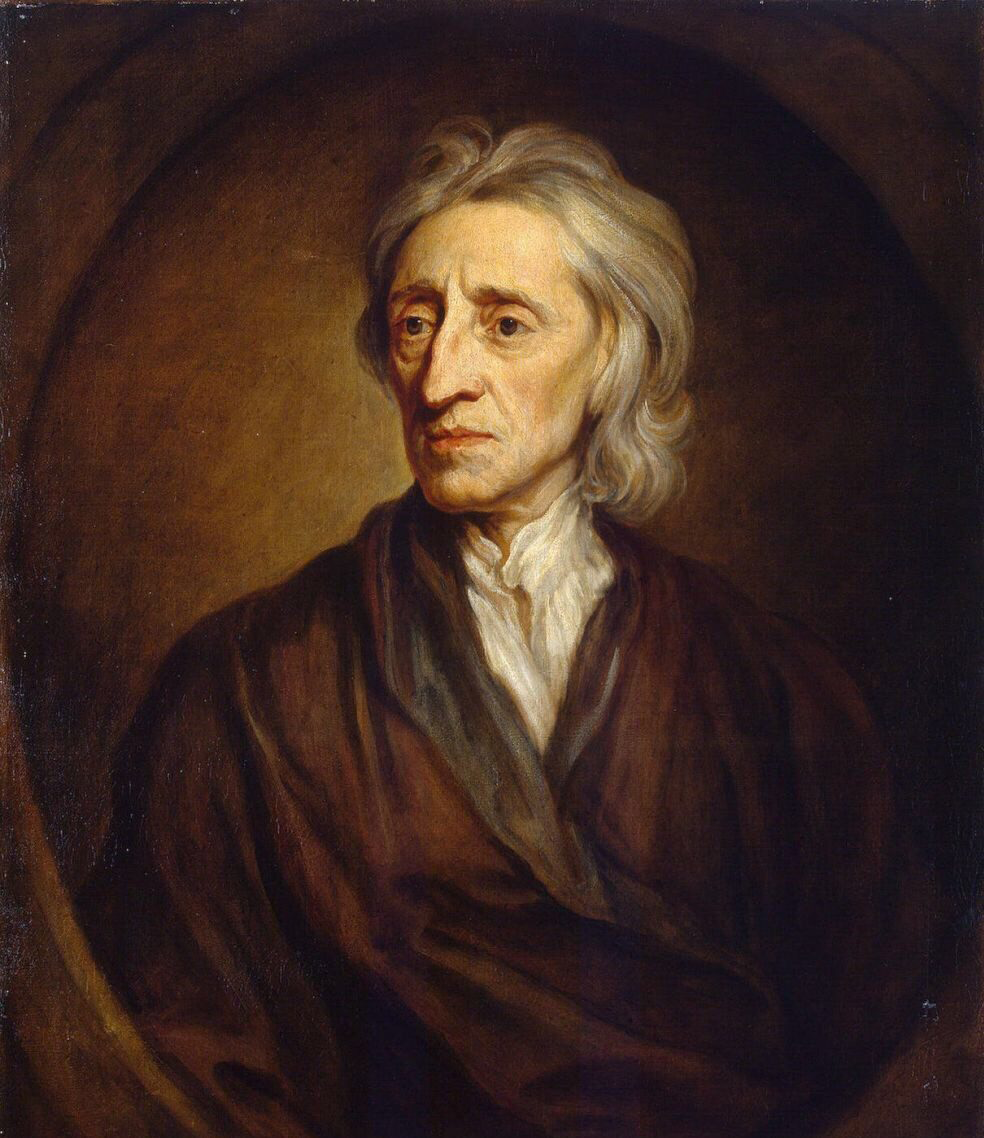
A 1697 portrait of English political philosopher John Locke

Historians have often sought to identify the sources that most influenced the words and political philosophy of the Declaration of Independence. By Jefferson's own admission, the Declaration contained no original ideas, but was instead a statement of sentiments widely shared by supporters of the American Revolution. As he explained in 1825:

Neither aiming at originality of principle or sentiment, nor yet copied from any particular and previous writing, it was intended to be an expression of the American mind, and to give to that expression the proper tone and spirit called for by the occasion.

Jefferson's most immediate sources were two documents written in June 1776: his own draft of the preamble of the Constitution of Virginia, and George Mason's draft of the Virginia Declaration of Rights. Ideas and phrases from both of these documents appear in the Declaration of Independence. Mason's opening was:

Section 1. That all men are by nature equally free and independent, and have certain inherent rights, of which, when they enter into a state of society, they cannot, by any compact, deprive or divest their posterity; namely, the enjoyment of life and liberty, with the means of acquiring and possessing property, and pursuing and obtaining happiness and safety.

Mason was, in turn, directly influenced by the 1689 English Declaration of Rights, which formally ended the reign of King James II. During the American Revolution, Jefferson and other Americans looked to the English Declaration of Rights as a model of how to end the reign of an unjust king. The Scottish Declaration of Arbroath (1320) and the Dutch Act of Abjuration (1581) have also been offered as models for Jefferson's Declaration, but these models are now accepted by few scholars. Maier found no evidence that the Dutch Act of Abjuration served as a model for the Declaration, and considers the argument "unpersuasive". Armitage discounts the influence of the Scottish and Dutch acts, and writes that neither was called "declarations of independence" until fairly recently. Stephen E. Lucas argued in favor of the influence of the Dutch act.

Jefferson wrote that a number of authors exerted a general influence on the words of the Declaration. English political theorist John Locke is usually cited as one of the primary influences, a man whom Jefferson called one of "the three greatest men that have ever lived".

In 1922, historian Carl L. Becker wrote, "Most Americans had absorbed Locke's works as a kind of political gospel; and the Declaration, in its form, in its phraseology, follows closely certain sentences in Locke's second treatise on government." The extent of Locke's influence on the American Revolution has been questioned by some subsequent scholars, however. Historian Ray Forrest Harvey argued in 1937 for the dominant influence of Swiss jurist Jean Jacques Burlamaqui, declaring that Jefferson and Locke were at "two opposite poles" in their political philosophy, as evidenced by Jefferson's use in the Declaration of Independence of the phrase "pursuit of happiness" instead of "property". Other scholars emphasized the influence of republicanism rather than Locke's classical liberalism. (Note: A brief, online overview of the classical liberalism vs. republicanism debate is by Alec Ewald at The American Republic: 1760-1870 at the Wayback Machine (archived 2008-05-17). Historian Robert Middlekauff argues that the political ideas of the independence movement took their origins mainly from the "eighteenth-century commonwealthmen, the radical Whig ideology", which in turn drew on the political thought of John Milton, James Harrington, and John Locke.)

Historian Garry Wills argued that Jefferson was influenced by the Scottish Enlightenment, particularly Francis Hutcheson, rather than Locke. (Note: See Inventing America, especially chapters 11–13. On Page 315 Wills states that "the air of enlightened America was full of Hutcheson's politics, not Locke's" an interpretation that has been strongly criticized by other historians) (Note: Hamowy in "Jefferson and the Scottish Enlightenment" argues that Wills gets much wrong (p. 523), that the Declaration seems to be influenced by Hutcheson because Hutcheson was, like Jefferson, influenced by Locke (pp. 508–09), and that Jefferson often wrote of Locke's influence, but never mentioned Hutcheson in any of his writings (p. 514). See also Kenneth S. Lynn, "Falsifying Jefferson", Commentary 66 (Oct. 1978), 66–71. Ralph Luker, in "Garry Wills and the New Debate Over the Declaration of Independence" Archived March 25, 2012, at the Wayback Machine (The Virginia Quarterly Review, Spring 1980, 244–61) agreed that Wills overstated Hutcheson's influence to provide a communitarian reading of the Declaration, but he also argued that Wills's critics similarly read their own views into the document.)

Legal historian John Phillip Reid has written that the emphasis on the political philosophy of the Declaration has been misplaced. The Declaration is not a philosophical tract about natural rights, argues Reid, but is instead a legal document—an indictment against King George for violating the constitutional rights of the colonists. As such, it follows the process of the 1550 Magdeburg Confession, which legitimized resistance against Holy Roman Emperor Charles V in a multi-step legal formula now known as the doctrine of the lesser magistrate.

Historian David Armitage has argued that the Declaration was strongly influenced by de Vattel's The Law of Nations, the dominant international law treatise of the period, and a book that Benjamin Franklin said was "continually in the hands of the members of our Congress". Armitage writes, "Vattel made independence fundamental to his definition of statehood"; therefore, the primary purpose of the Declaration was "to express the international legal sovereignty of the United States". If the United States were to have any hope of being recognized by the European powers, the American revolutionaries first had to make it clear that they were no longer dependent on Great Britain. The Declaration of Independence does not have the force of law domestically, but nevertheless it may help to provide historical and legal clarity about the Constitution and other laws.

Historian Andrew Roberts wrote about the United States Declaration of Independence that only two (justifications) stand up … the seventeeth about imposing taxes without the colonists’ consent and the twenty-second about Parliament being invested with power to legislate for us; but those two “went to the heart of the issue, and justified the whole rebellion on their own:

== Signing ==
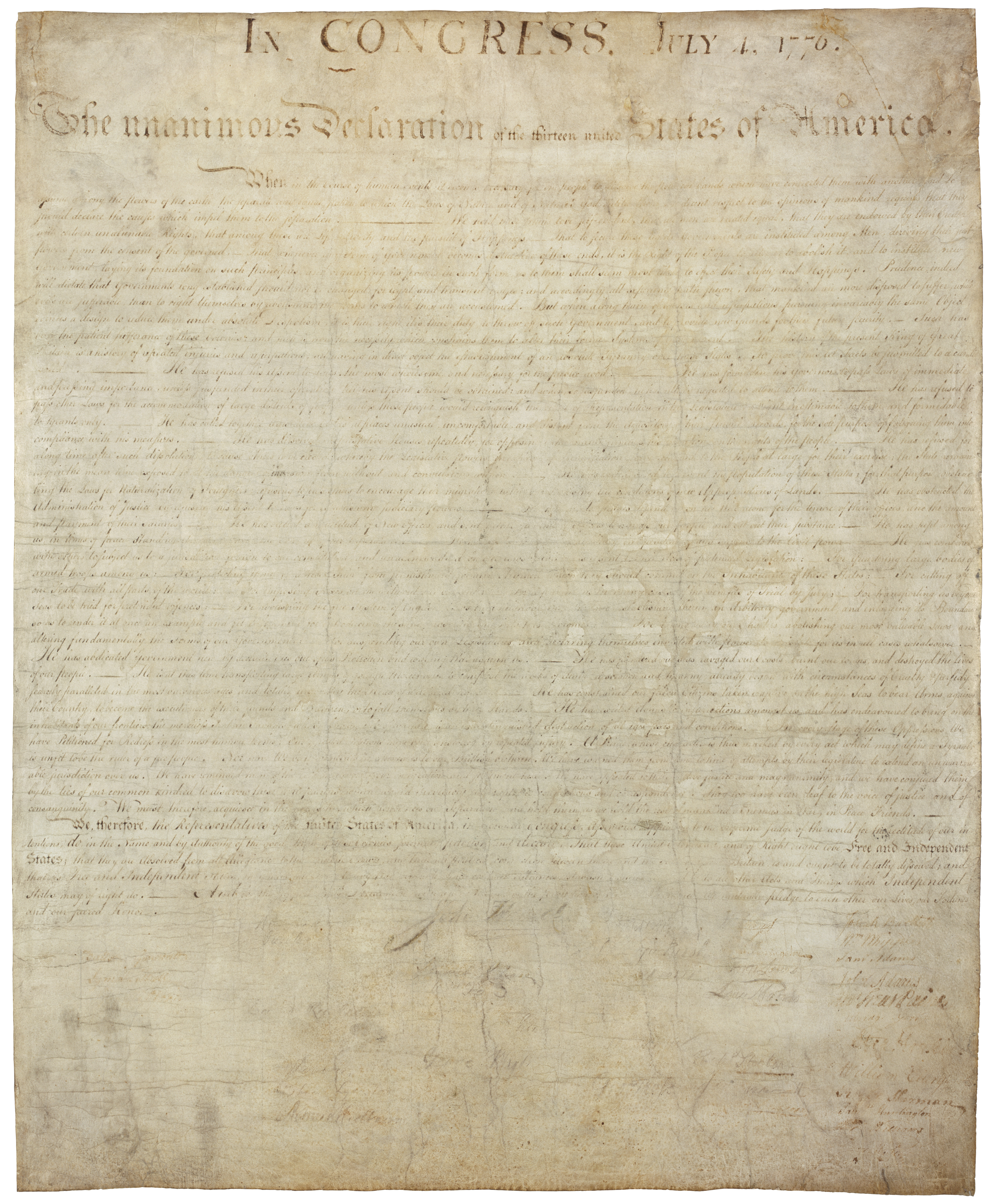
The signed Declaration of Independence, now badly faded because of poor preservation practices during the 19th century, is on display at the National Archives in Washington, D.C.

On July 4, 1776, Second Continental Congress President John Hancock's signature authenticated the Declaration of Independence.

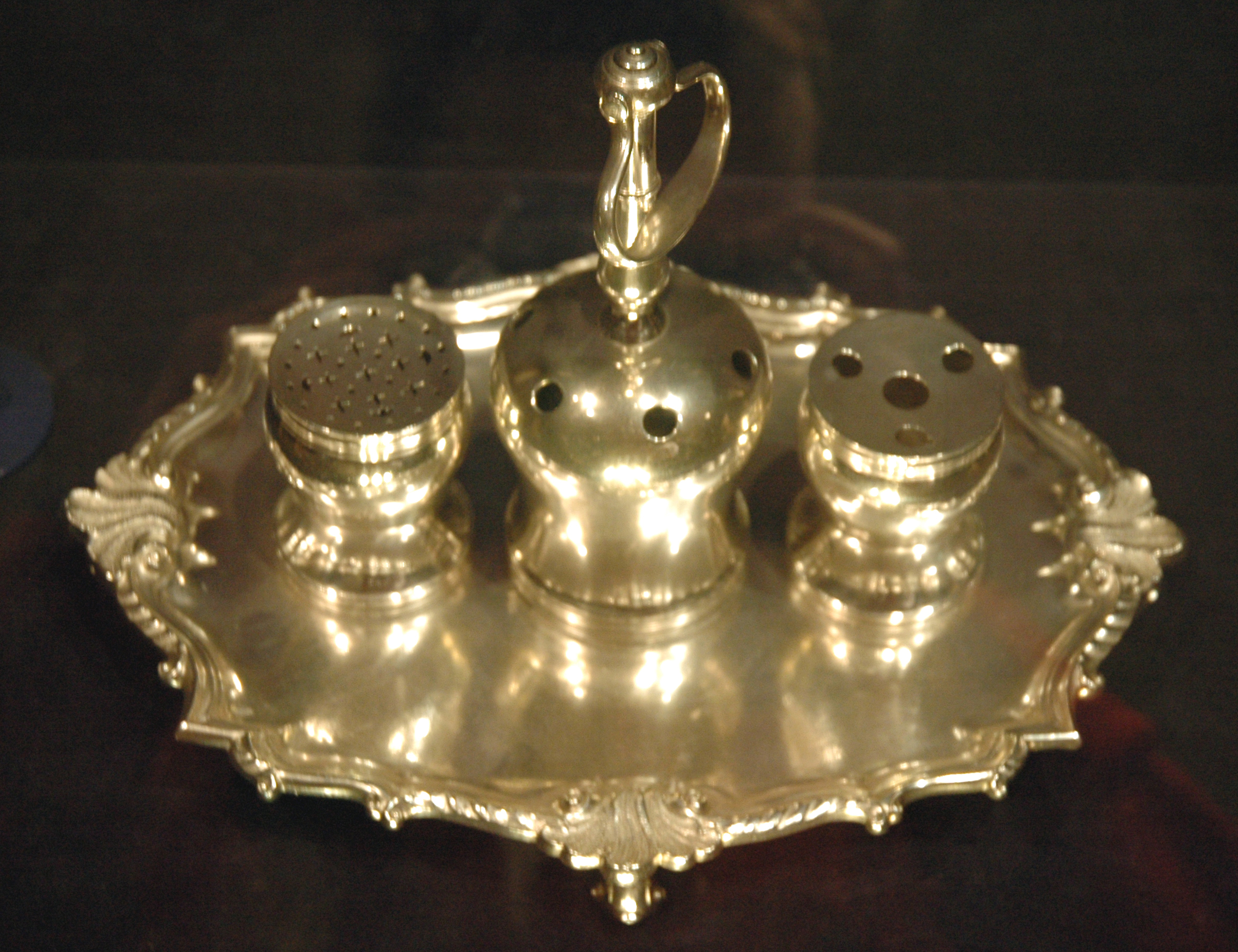
The Syng inkstand used for the signing of the Declaration and the Constitution

The Declaration became official when Congress recorded its vote adopting the document on July 4; it was transposed on paper and signed by John Hancock, President of the Congress, on that day. Signatures of the other delegates were not needed to further authenticate it. The signatures of fifty-six delegates are affixed to the Declaration, though the exact date when each person signed became debatable. Jefferson, Franklin, and Adams all wrote that the Declaration was signed by Congress on July 4. But in 1796, signer Thomas McKean disputed that, because some signers were not then present, including several who were not even elected to Congress until after that date. Historians have generally accepted McKean's version of events. History particularly shows most delegates signed on August 2, 1776, and those who were not then present added their names later.

In an 1811 letter to Adams, Benjamin Rush recounted the signing on August 2 in stark fashion, describing it as a scene of "pensive and awful silence". Rush said the delegates were called up, one after another, and then filed forward somberly to subscribe what each thought was their ensuing death warrant. He related that the "gloom of the morning" was briefly interrupted when the rotund Benjamin Harrison of Virginia said to a diminutive Elbridge Gerry of Massachusetts, at the signing table, "I shall have a great advantage over you, Mr. Gerry, when we are all hung for what we are now doing. From the size and weight of my body I shall die in a few minutes and be with the Angels, but from the lightness of your body you will dance in the air an hour or two before you are dead." According to Rush, Harrison's remark "procured a transient smile, but it was soon succeeded by the Solemnity with which the whole business was conducted."

The signatories include then future presidents John Adams and Thomas Jefferson, though the most legendary signature is John Hancock's. His large, flamboyant signature became iconic, and the term John Hancock emerged in the United States as a metaphor of "signature". A commonly circulated but apocryphal account claims that, after Hancock signed, the delegate from Massachusetts commented, "The British ministry can read that name without spectacles." Another report indicates that Hancock proudly declared, "There! I guess King George will be able to read that!"

A legend emerged years later about the signing of the Declaration, after the document had become an important national symbol. John Hancock is supposed to have said that Congress, having signed the Declaration, must now "all hang together", and Benjamin Franklin replied: "Yes, we must indeed all hang together, or most assuredly we shall all hang separately." That quotation first appeared in print in an 1837 London humor magazine.

The Syng inkstand used at the signing was also used at the signing of the United States Constitution in 1787.

== Publication and reaction ==
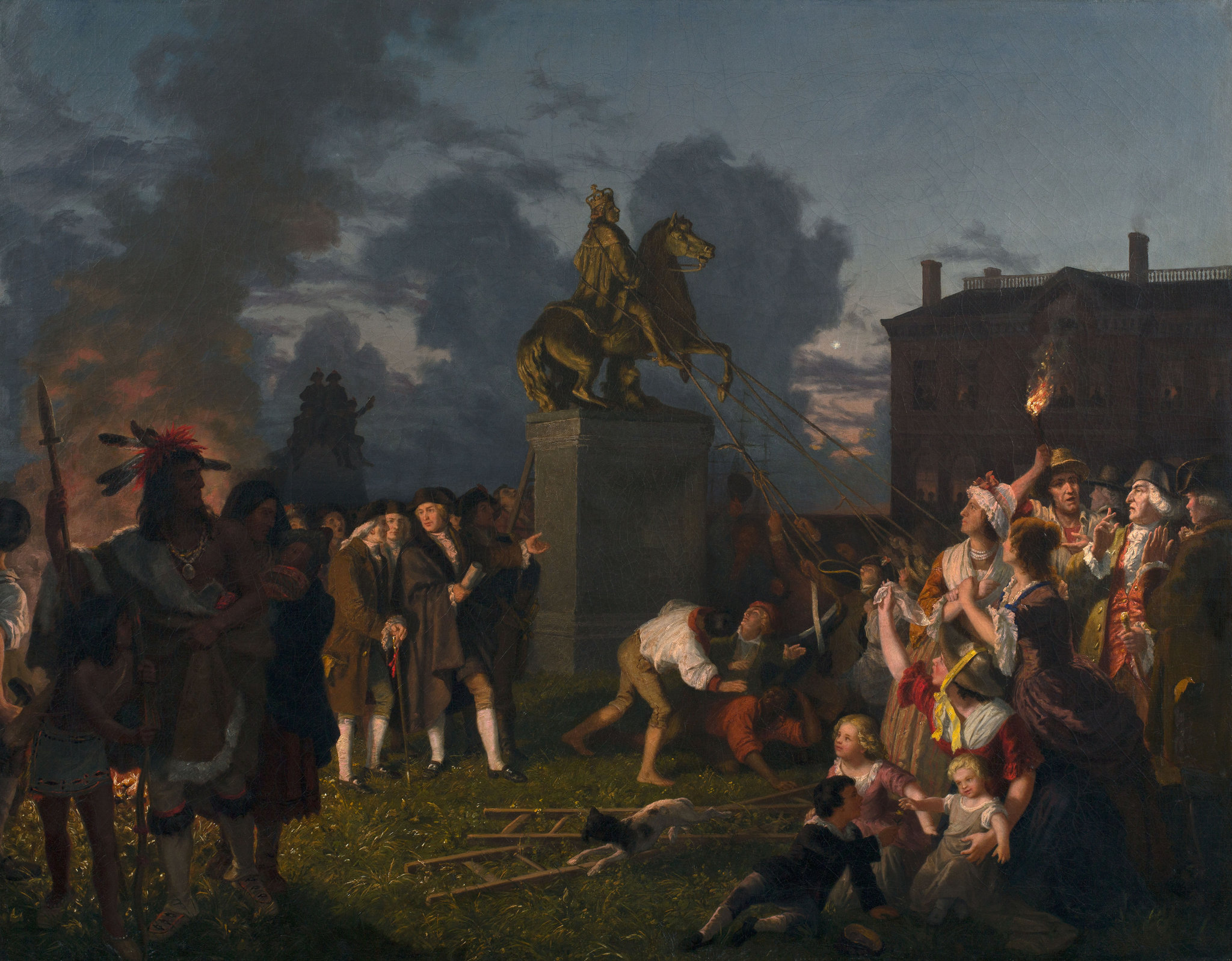
Johannes Adam Simon Oertel's portrait Pulling Down the Statue of King George III, N.Y.C., c. 1859, depicts citizens destroying a statue of King George after the Declaration was read in New York City on July 9, 1776.

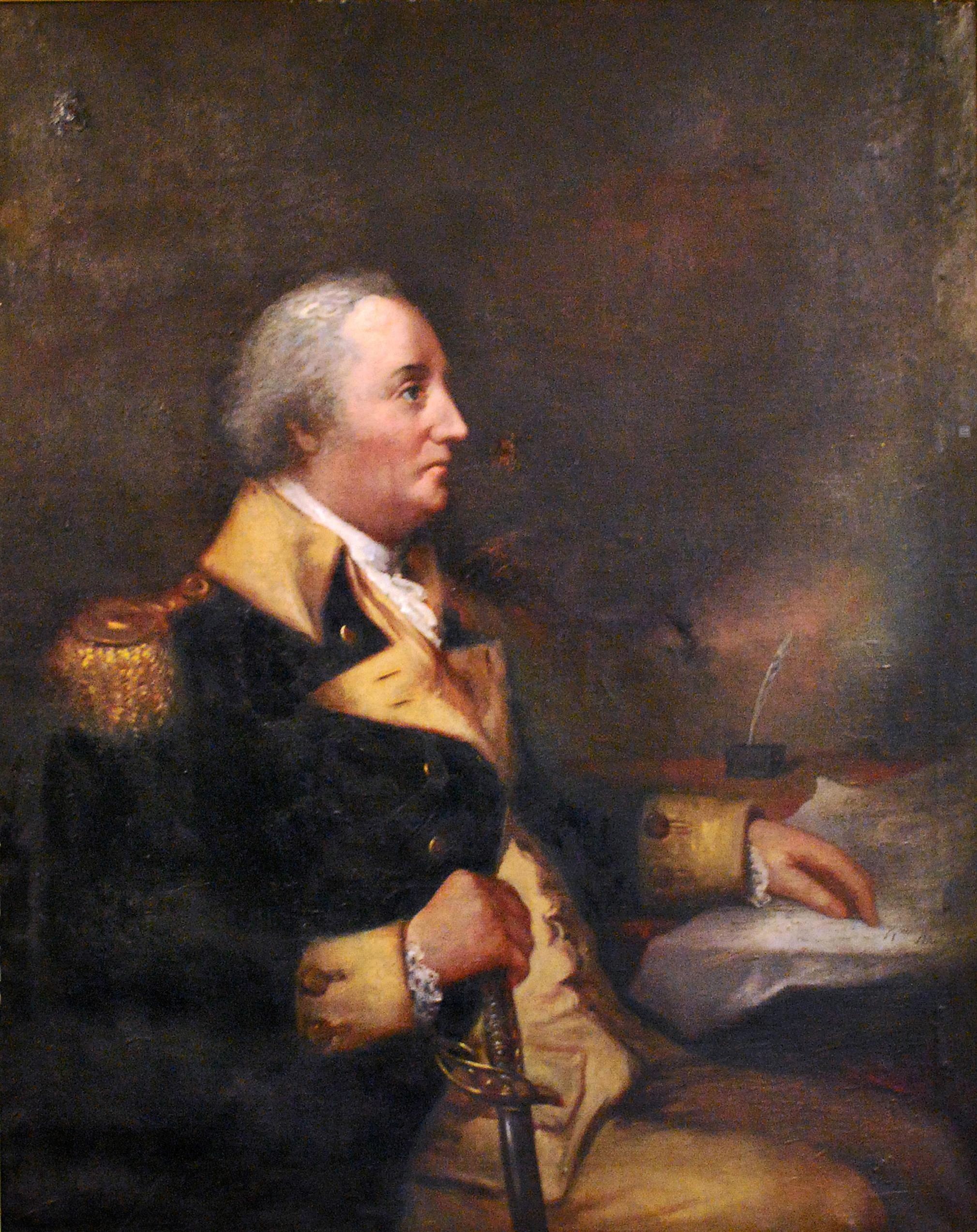
William Whipple, signer of the Declaration of Independence, freed a person he had enslaved, believing that he could not both fight for liberty and own a slave.

After the Second Continental Congress unanimously approved the final wording of the Declaration on July 4, a handwritten copy was sent a few blocks away to the printing shop of John Dunlap. Throughout the night, Dunlap printed about 200 broadsides for distribution. The source copy used for this printing has been lost and may have been a copy in Thomas Jefferson's hand. The first formal public readings of the document took place simultaneously on July 8, at noon in three locations: Philadelphia, where it was read by John Nixon in the yard of present-day Independence Hall, Trenton, New Jersey, and Easton, Pennsylvania. The first newspaper to publish the Declaration was The Pennsylvania Evening Post, which published it on July 6. A German translation of the Declaration was published in Philadelphia by July 9. It was subsequently widely read and published throughout the Thirteen Colonies.

President of Congress John Hancock sent a broadside to General George Washington, instructing him to have it proclaimed "at the Head of the Army in the way you shall think it most proper". Washington had the Declaration read to his troops in New York City on July 9, with thousands of British troops on ships in the harbor. Washington and Congress hoped that the Declaration would inspire the soldiers, and encourage others to join the army. After hearing the Declaration, crowds in many cities tore down and destroyed signs or statues representing royal authority. An equestrian statue of King George in New York City was pulled down and the lead used to make musket balls.

One of the first readings of the Declaration by the British is believed to have taken place at the Rose and Crown Tavern on Staten Island, New York in the presence of General Howe. British officials in North America sent copies of the Declaration to Great Britain. It was published in British newspapers beginning in mid-August, it had reached Florence and Warsaw by mid-September, and a German translation appeared in Switzerland by October. The first copy of the Declaration sent to France got lost, and the second copy arrived only in November 1776. News of the Declaration managed to reach Russia on August 13 via a dispatch from the Russian chargé d'affaires in London, Nikita Panin. It reached Portuguese America by Brazilian medical student "Vendek" José Joaquim Maia e Barbalho, who had met with Thomas Jefferson in Nîmes.

The Spanish-American authorities banned the circulation of the Declaration, but it was widely transmitted and translated: by Venezuelan Manuel García de Sena, by Colombian Miguel de Pombo, by Ecuadorian Vicente Rocafuerte, and by New Englanders Richard Cleveland and William Shaler, who distributed the Declaration and the United States Constitution among Creoles in Chile and Indians in Mexico in 1821. The North Ministry did not give an official answer to the Declaration, but instead secretly commissioned pamphleteer John Lind to publish a response entitled Answer to the Declaration of the American Congress. British Tories denounced the signers of the Declaration for not applying the same principles of "life, liberty, and the pursuit of happiness" to African Americans. Thomas Hutchinson, the former royal governor of Massachusetts, also published a rebuttal. These pamphlets challenged various aspects of the Declaration. Hutchinson argued that the American Revolution was the work of a few conspirators who wanted independence from the outset, and who had finally achieved it by inducing otherwise loyal colonists to rebel. Lind's pamphlet had an anonymous attack on the concept of natural rights written by Jeremy Bentham, an argument that he repeated during the French Revolution. Both pamphlets questioned how the American slaveholders in Congress could proclaim that "all men are created equal" without freeing their own slaves.

William Whipple, a signer of the Declaration of Independence who had fought in the war, freed his slave Prince Whipple because of his revolutionary ideals. In the postwar decades, other slaveholders also freed their slaves; from 1790 to 1810, the percentage of free blacks in the Upper South increased to 8.3 percent from less than one percent of the black population. Northern states began abolishing slavery shortly after the war for independence began, and all had abolished slavery by 1804.

Later in late November 1776, a group of 547 Loyalists, largely from New York, signed a Declaration of Dependence in New York City at Fraunces Tavern in Manhattan pledging their loyalty to the Crown.

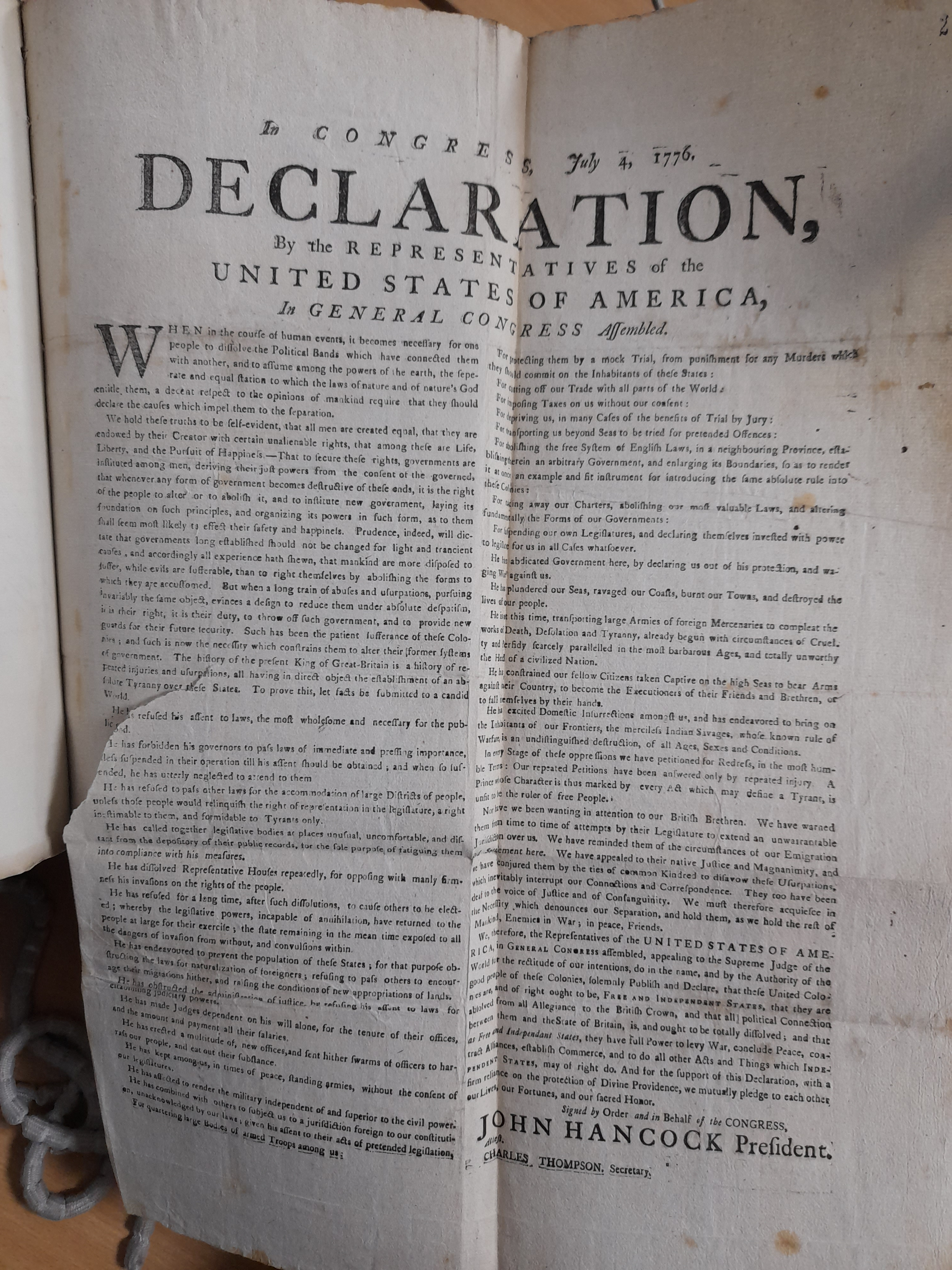
Copy of printed Declaration of Independence issued to American naval ships, captured at sea and sent to the Admiralty in London.

Printed copies of the Declaration of Independence were issued to the captains of vessels in the newly formed Navy of America which when captured were sent to Britain.

== History of the documents ==
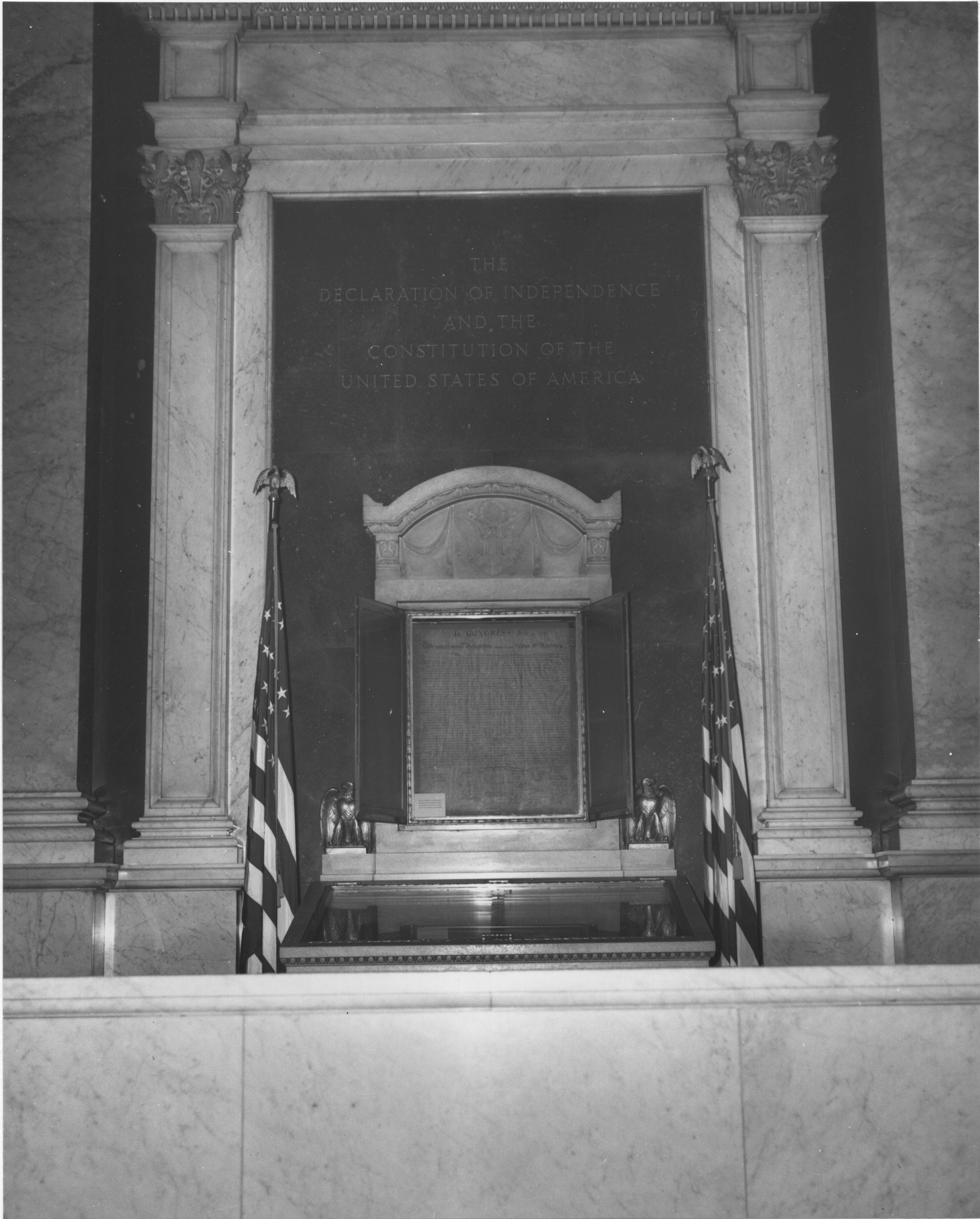
The Declaration of Independence and the Constitution on display in the Library of Congress prior to the removal to the National Archives, December 13, 1952

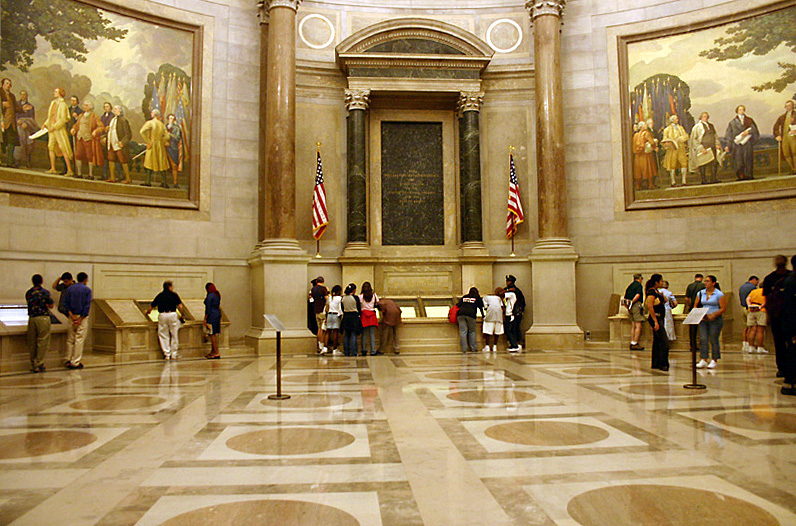
The National Archives' Rotunda for the Charters of Freedom where, between two Barry Faulkner murals, the original United States Declaration of Independence, United States Constitution, and other American founding documents are publicly exhibited

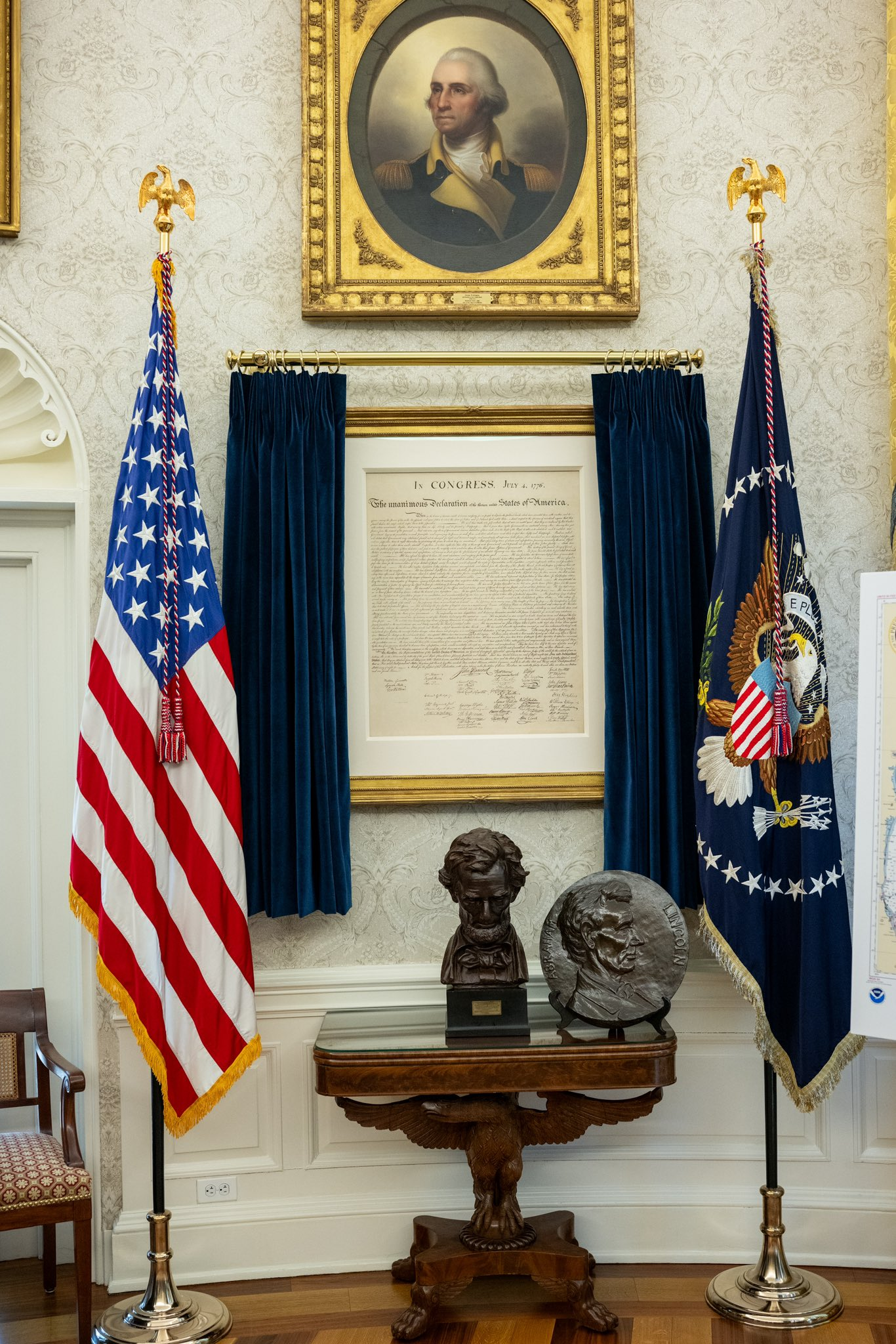
In March 2025, President Donald Trump requested that a copy of the Declaration of Independence be hung in the Oval Office.

The official copy of the Declaration of Independence was the one printed on July 4, 1776, under Jefferson's supervision. It was sent to the states and to the Army and was widely reprinted in newspapers. The slightly different "engrossed copy" (shown at the top of this article) was made later for members to sign. The engrossed version is the one widely distributed in the 21st century. Note that the opening lines differ between the two versions.

The copy of the Declaration that was signed by Congress is known as the engrossed or parchment copy. It was probably engrossed (that is, carefully handwritten) by clerk Timothy Matlack. A facsimile made in 1823 has become the basis of most modern reproductions rather than the original because of poor conservation of the engrossed copy through the 19th century. In 1921, custody of the engrossed copy of the Declaration was transferred from the State Department to the Library of Congress, along with the United States Constitution.

After the Japanese attack on Pearl Harbor in 1941, the documents were moved for safekeeping to the United States Bullion Depository at Fort Knox in Kentucky, where they were kept until 1944. In 1952, the engrossed Declaration was transferred to the National Archives and is now on permanent display at the National Archives in the "Rotunda for the Charters of Freedom".

The document signed by Congress and enshrined in the National Archives is usually regarded as the Declaration of Independence, but historian Julian P. Boyd argued that the Declaration, like Magna Carta, is not a single document. Boyd considered the printed broadsides ordered by Congress to be official texts, as well. The Declaration was first published as a broadside that was printed the night of July 4 by John Dunlap of Philadelphia. Dunlap printed about 200 broadsides, of which 26 are known to survive. The 26th copy was discovered in The National Archives in England in 2009.

In 1777, Congress commissioned Mary Katherine Goddard to print a new broadside that listed the signers of the Declaration, unlike the Dunlap broadside. Nine copies of the Goddard broadside are known to still exist. A variety of broadsides printed by the states are also extant, including seven copies of the Solomon Southwick broadside, one of which was acquired by Washington University in St. Louis in 2015.

Several early handwritten copies and drafts of the Declaration have also been preserved. Jefferson kept a four-page draft that late in life he called the "original Rough draught". Historians now understand that Jefferson's Rough draft was one in a series of drafts used by the Committee of Five before being submitted to Congress for deliberation. According to Boyd, the first, "original" handwritten draft of the Declaration of Independence that predated Jefferson's Rough draft, was lost or destroyed during the drafting process. It is not known how many drafts Jefferson wrote prior to this one, and how much of the text was contributed by other committee members.

In 1947, Boyd discovered a fragment of an earlier draft in Jefferson's handwriting that predates Jefferson's Rough draft. In 2018, the Thomas Paine National Historical Association published findings on an additional early handwritten draft of the Declaration, referred to as the "Sherman Copy", that John Adams copied from the lost original draft for Committee of Five members Roger Sherman and Benjamin Franklin's initial review. An inscription on the document noting "A beginning perhaps...", the early state of the text, and the manner in which this document was hastily taken, appears to chronologically place this draft earlier than both the fair Adams copy held in the Massachusetts Historical Society collection and the Jefferson "rough draft". After the text was finalized by Congress as a whole, Jefferson and Adams sent copies of the rough draft to friends, with variations noted from the original drafts.

During the writing process, Jefferson showed the rough draft to Adams and Franklin, and perhaps to other members of the drafting committee, who made a few more changes. Franklin, for example, may have been responsible for changing Jefferson's original phrase "We hold these truths to be sacred and undeniable" to "We hold these truths to be self-evident". Jefferson incorporated these changes into a copy that was submitted to Congress in the name of the committee. The copy that was submitted to Congress on June 28 has been lost and was either perhaps destroyed during the printing process, or destroyed during the debates in accordance with Congress's secrecy rule.

On April 21, 2017, it was announced that a second engrossed copy had been discovered in the archives at West Sussex County Council in Chichester, England. Named by its finders the "Sussex Declaration", it differs from the National Archives copy (which the finders refer to as the "Matlack Declaration") in that the signatures on it are not grouped by States. How it came to be in England is not yet known, but the finders believe that the randomness of the signatures points to an origin with signatory James Wilson, who had argued strongly that the Declaration was made not by the States but by the whole people.

Years of exposure to damaging lighting resulted in the original Declaration of Independence document having much of its ink fade by 1876.

At the request of President Donald Trump, a copy of the Declaration of Independence was hung in the Oval Office in March 2025.

== Legacy ==
The Declaration was given little attention in the years immediately following the American Revolution, having served its original purpose in announcing the independence of the United States. Early celebrations of Independence Day largely ignored the Declaration, as did early histories of the Revolution. The act of declaring independence was considered important, whereas the text announcing that act attracted little attention. The Declaration was rarely mentioned during the debates about the United States Constitution, and its language was not incorporated into that document. George Mason's draft of the Virginia Declaration of Rights was more influential, and its language was echoed in state constitutions and state bills of rights more often than Jefferson's words. "In none of these documents", wrote Pauline Maier, "is there any evidence whatsoever that the Declaration of Independence lived in men's minds as a classic statement of American political principles."

=== Global influence ===
Many leaders of the French Revolution admired the Declaration of Independence but were also interested in the new American state constitutions. The inspiration and content of the French Declaration of the Rights of Man and of the Citizen (1789) emerged largely from the ideals of the American Revolution. Lafayette prepared its key drafts, working closely in Paris with his friend Thomas Jefferson. It also borrowed language from George Mason's Virginia Declaration of Rights. The declaration also influenced the Russian Empire, and it had a particular impact on the Decembrist revolt and other Russian thinkers.

Historian George Athan Billias says: "Independence amounted to a new status of interdependence: the United States was now a sovereign nation entitled to the privileges and responsibilities that came with that status. America thus became a member of the international community, which meant becoming a maker of treaties and alliances, a military ally in diplomacy, and a partner in foreign trade on a more equal basis."

According to historian David Armitage, the Declaration of Independence did prove to be internationally influential, but not as a statement of human rights. Armitage argues that the Declaration was the first in a new genre of declarations of independence which announced the creation of new states. Other French leaders were directly influenced by the text of the Declaration of Independence itself. The Manifesto of the Province of Flanders (1790) was the first foreign derivation of the Declaration; others include the Venezuelan Declaration of Independence (1811), the Liberian Declaration of Independence (1847), the declarations of secession by the Confederate States of America (1860–61), and the Vietnamese Proclamation of Independence (1945). These declarations echoed the United States Declaration of Independence in announcing the independence of a new state, without necessarily endorsing the political philosophy of the original.

Other countries have used the Declaration as inspiration or have directly copied sections from it. These include the Haitian declaration of January 1, 1804, during the Haitian Revolution, the United Provinces of New Granada in 1811, the Argentine Declaration of Independence in 1816, the Chilean Declaration of Independence in 1818, Costa Rica in 1821, El Salvador in 1821, Guatemala in 1821, Honduras in 1821, Mexico in 1821, Nicaragua in 1821, Peru in 1821, Bolivian War of Independence in 1825, Uruguay in 1825, Ecuador in 1830, Colombia in 1831, Paraguay in 1842, Dominican Republic in 1844, Texas Declaration of Independence in March 1836, California Republic in November 1836, Hungarian Declaration of Independence in 1849, Declaration of the Independence of New Zealand in 1835, and the Czechoslovak declaration of independence from 1918 drafted in Washington, D.C., with Gutzon Borglum among the drafters. The Rhodesian declaration of independence is based on the American one, as well, ratified in November 1965, although it notably omits the phrases "all men are created equal" and "the consent of the governed". In a similar vein, the South Carolinian declaration of secession from December 1860 also mentions the U.S. Declaration of Independence, though it too omits references to "all men are created equal" and "consent of the governed".

=== Revival of interest ===
Interest in the Declaration was revived in the 1790s with the emergence of the United States's first political parties. Throughout the 1780s, few Americans knew or cared who wrote the Declaration. But in the next decade, Jeffersonian Republicans sought political advantage over their rival Federalists by promoting both the importance of the Declaration and Jefferson as its author. Federalists responded by casting doubt on Jefferson's authorship or originality, and by emphasizing that independence was declared by the whole Congress, with Jefferson as just one member of the drafting committee. Federalists insisted that Congress's act of declaring independence, in which Federalist John Adams had played a major role, was more important than the document announcing it. But this view faded away, like the Federalist Party itself, and, before long, the act of declaring independence became synonymous with the document.

A less partisan appreciation for the Declaration emerged in the years following the War of 1812, thanks to a growing American nationalism and a renewed interest in the history of the Revolution. In 1817, Congress commissioned John Trumbull's famous painting of the signers, which was exhibited to large crowds before being installed in the Capitol. The earliest commemorative printings of the Declaration also appeared at this time, offering many Americans their first view of the signed document. Collective biographies of the signers were first published in the 1820s, giving birth to what Garry Wills called the "cult of the signers". In the years that followed, many stories about the writing and signing of the document were published for the first time.

When interest in the Declaration was revived, the sections that were most important in 1776 were no longer relevant: the announcement of the independence of the United States and the grievances against King George. But the second paragraph was applicable long after the war had ended, with its talk of self-evident truths and unalienable rights. The identity of natural law since the 18th century has seen increasing ascendancy towards political and moral norms versus the law of nature, God, or human nature as seen in the past. The Constitution and the Bill of Rights lacked sweeping statements about rights and equality, and advocates of groups with grievances turned to the Declaration for support. Starting in the 1820s, variations of the Declaration were issued to proclaim the rights of workers, farmers, women, and others. In 1848, for example, the Seneca Falls Convention of women's rights advocates declared that "all men and women are created equal".

=== John Trumbull's Declaration of Independence (1817–1826) ===
John Trumbull's famous 1818 portrait is often identified as a depiction of the Declaration's signing, but it actually shows the drafting committee presenting its work to the Second Continental Congress.

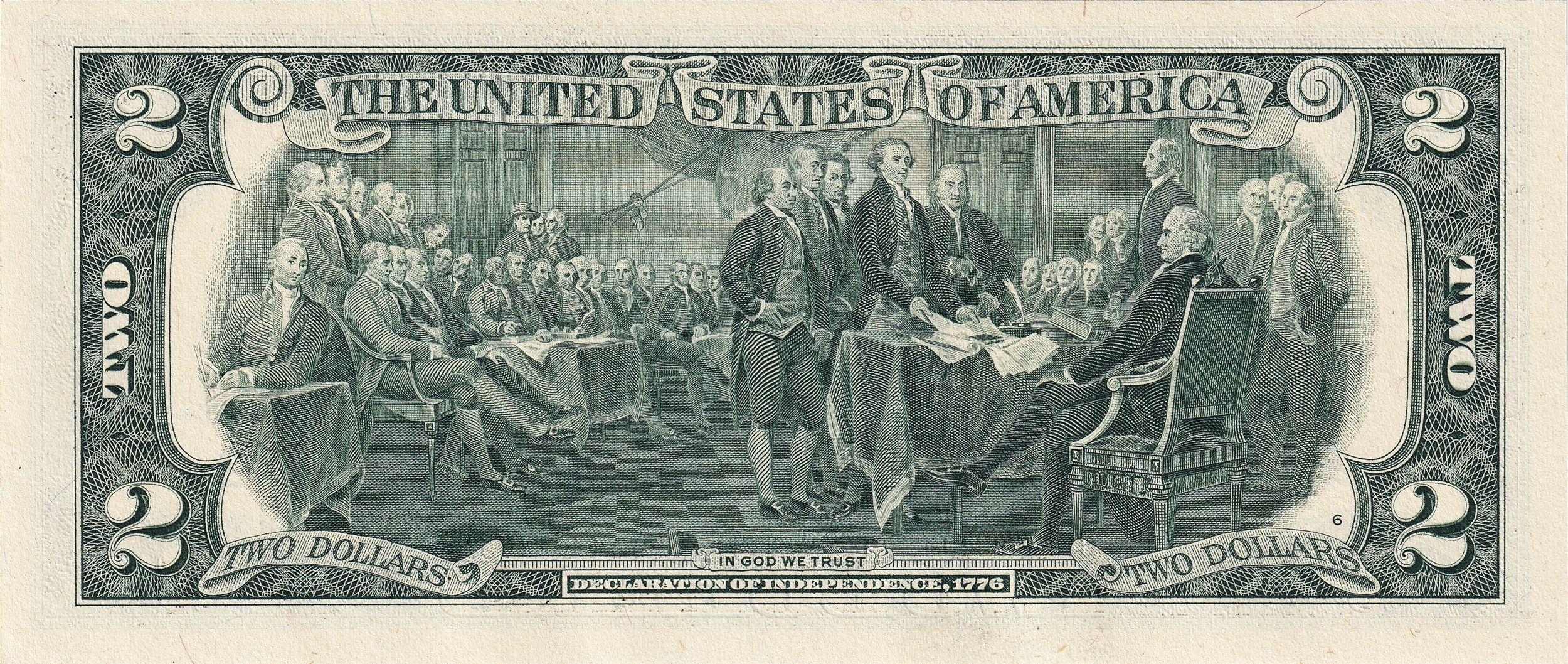
The reverse side of the United States two-dollar bill

John Trumbull's painting Declaration of Independence has played a significant role in popular conceptions of the Declaration of Independence. The painting is 12-by-18-foot (3.7 by 5.5 m) in size and was commissioned by the United States Congress in 1817; it has hung in the United States Capitol Rotunda since 1826. It is sometimes described as the signing of the Declaration of Independence, but it actually shows the Committee of Five presenting their draft of the Declaration to the Second Continental Congress on June 28, 1776, and not the signing of the document, which took place later.

Trumbull painted the figures from life whenever possible, but some had died and images could not be located; hence, the painting does not include all the signers of the Declaration. One figure had participated in the drafting but did not sign the final document; another refused to sign. In fact, the membership of the Second Continental Congress changed as time passed, and the figures in the painting were never in the same room at the same time. It is, however, an accurate depiction of the room in Independence Hall, the centerpiece of the Independence National Historical Park in Philadelphia, Pennsylvania.

Trumbull's painting has been depicted multiple times on U.S. currency and postage stamps. Its first use was on the reverse side of the $100 National Bank Note issued in 1863. A few years later, the steel engraving used in printing the bank notes was used to produce a 24-cent stamp, issued as part of the 1869 Pictorial Issue. An engraving of the signing scene has been featured on the reverse side of the United States two-dollar bill since 1976.

=== Slavery and the Declaration ===
The apparent contradiction between the claim that "all men are created equal" and the existence of slavery in the United States attracted comment when the Declaration was first published. Many of the founders understood the incompatibility of the statement of natural equality with the institution of slavery, but continued to enjoy the "Rights of Man". Jefferson had included a paragraph in his initial rough Draft of the Declaration of Independence vigorously condemning the evil of the slave trade, and condemning King George III for forcing it onto the colonies, but this was deleted from the final version.

he has waged cruel war against human nature itself, violating it's most sacred rights of life & liberty in the persons of a distant people who never offended him, captivating & carrying them into slavery in another hemisphere, or to incur miserable death in their transportation thither. this piratical warfare, the opprobrium of infidel powers, is the warfare of the CHRISTIAN king of Great Britain. determined to keep open a market where MEN should be bought & sold, he has prostituted his negative for suppressing every legislative attempt to prohibit or to restrain this execrable commerce: and that this assemblage of horrors might want no fact of distinguished die, he is now exciting those very people to rise in arms among us, and to purchase that liberty of which he had deprived them, & murdering the people upon whom he also obtruded them; thus paying off former crimes committed against the liberties of one people, with crimes which he urges them to commit against the lives of another.

Jefferson himself was a prominent Virginia slaveowner, owning six hundred enslaved Africans on his Monticello plantation. Referring to this contradiction, English abolitionist Thomas Day wrote in a 1776 letter, "If there be an object truly ridiculous in nature, it is an American patriot, signing resolutions of independency with the one hand, and with the other brandishing a whip over his affrighted slaves." The African-American writer Lemuel Haynes expressed similar viewpoints in his essay "Liberty Further Extended", where he wrote that "Liberty is Equally as pre[c]ious to a Black man, as it is to a white one".

In the 19th century, the Declaration took on a special significance for the abolitionist movement. Historian Bertram Wyatt-Brown wrote that "abolitionists tended to interpret the Declaration of Independence as a theological as well as a political document". Abolitionist leaders Benjamin Lundy and William Lloyd Garrison adopted the "twin rocks" of "the Bible and the Declaration of Independence" as the basis for their philosophies. He wrote, "As long as there remains a single copy of the Declaration of Independence, or of the Bible, in our land, we will not despair." For radical abolitionists such as Garrison, the most important part of the Declaration was its assertion of the right of revolution. Garrison called for the destruction of the government under the Constitution, and the creation of a new state dedicated to the principles of the Declaration.

On July 5, 1852, Frederick Douglass delivered a speech asking the question, "What to the Slave Is the Fourth of July?".

The controversial question of whether to allow additional slave states into the United States coincided with the growing stature of the Declaration. The first major public debate about slavery and the Declaration took place during the Missouri controversy of 1819 to 1821. Anti-slavery Congressmen argued that the language of the Declaration indicated that the Founding Fathers of the United States had been opposed to slavery in principle, and so new slave states should not be added to the country. Pro-slavery Congressmen led by Senator Nathaniel Macon of North Carolina argued that the Declaration was not a part of the Constitution and therefore had no relevance to the question.

With the abolitionist movement gaining momentum, defenders of slavery such as John Randolph and John C. Calhoun found it necessary to argue that the Declaration's assertion that "all men are created equal" was false, or at least that it did not apply to black people. During the debate over the Kansas–Nebraska Act in 1853, for example, Senator John Pettit of Indiana argued that the statement "all men are created equal" was not a "self-evident truth" but a "self-evident lie". Opponents of the Kansas–Nebraska Act, including Salmon P. Chase and Benjamin Wade, defended the Declaration and what they saw as its antislavery principles.

=== John Brown's Declaration of Liberty ===
In preparing for his raid on Harper's Ferry, said by Frederick Douglass to be the beginning of the end of slavery in the United States, abolitionist John Brown had many copies printed of a Provisional Constitution. When the seceding states created the Confederate States of America 16 months later, they operated for over a year under a Provisional Constitution. It outlines the three branches of government in the quasi-country he hoped to set up in the Appalachian Mountains. It was widely reproduced in the press, and in full in the Select Senate Committee report on John Brown's insurrection (the Mason Report).

Brown did not have it printed, and his Declaration of Liberty, dated July 4, 1859, was found among his papers at the Kennedy Farm. It was written out on sheets of paper attached to fabric, to allow it to be rolled, and it was rolled when found. The hand is that of Owen Brown, who often served as his father's amanuensis.

Imitating the vocabulary, punctuation, and capitalization of the 73-year-old U.S. Declaration, the 2000-word document begins:

July 4th 1859

A Declaration of Liberty By the Representatives of the slave Popolation [sic] of the United States of America

When in the course of human events, it becomes necessary for an Oppressed People to Rise, and assert their Natural Rights, as Human Beings, as Native & mutual Citizens of a free Republic, and break that odious Yoke of oppression, which is so unjustly laid upon them by their fellow Countrymen, and to assume among the powers of Earth the same equal privileges to which the Laws of Nature, & natures God entitle them; A moderate respect for the opinions of Mankind, requires that they should declare the causes which incite them to this just & worthy action.

We hold these truths to be Self Evident; That All Men are Created Equal; That they are endowed by their Creator with certain unalienable rights. That among these are Life, Liberty; & the persuit of happiness. That Nature hath freely given to all Men, a full Supply of Air. Water, & Land; for their sustinance, & mutual happiness, That No Man has any right to deprive his fellow Man, of these Inherent rights, except in punishment of Crime. That to secure these rights governments are instituted among Men, deriving their just powers from the consent of the governed. That when any form of Government, becomes destructive to these ends, It is the right of the People, to alter, Amend, or Remoddel it, Laying its foundation on Such Principles, & organizing its powers in such form as to them shall seem most likely to effect the safety, & happiness of the Human Race.

— John Brown

The document was apparently intended to be read aloud, but so far as is known Brown never did so, even though he read the Provisional Constitution aloud the day the raid on Harpers Ferry began. Very much aware of the history of the American Revolution, he would have read the Declaration aloud after the revolt had started. The document was not published until 1894, and by someone who did not realize its importance and buried it in an appendix of documents. It is missing from most but not all studies of John Brown.

=== Lincoln and the Declaration ===
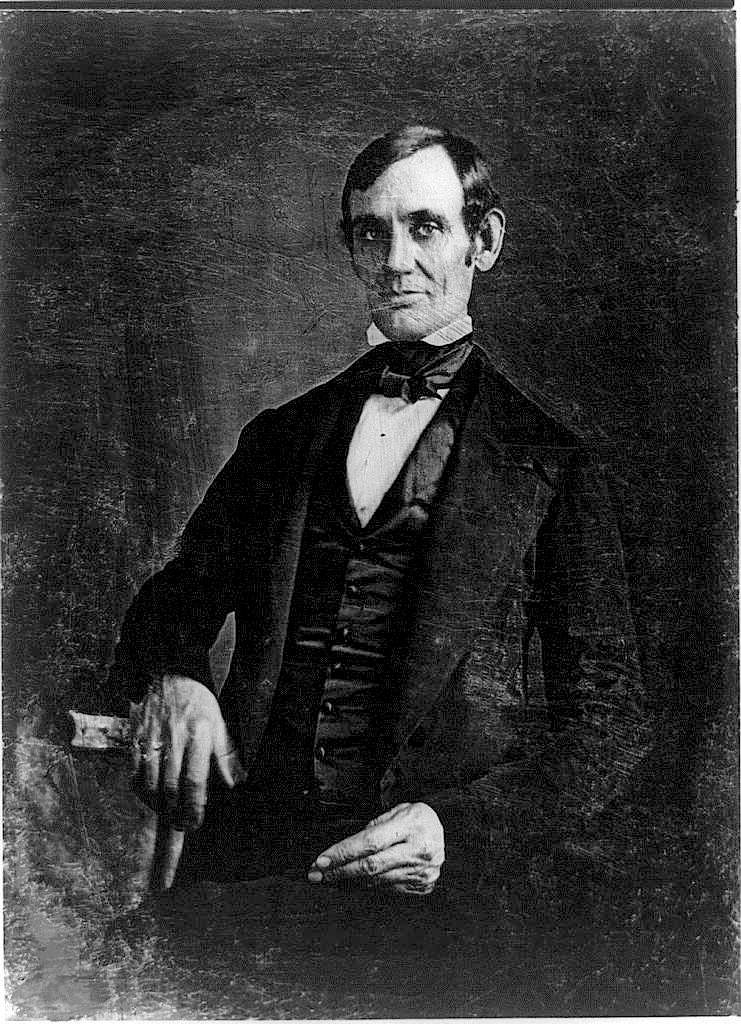
Then U.S. Congressman Abraham Lincoln, who believed the Declaration expressed the highest principles of the American Revolution, in 1846

The Declaration's relationship to slavery was taken up in 1854 by Abraham Lincoln, a little-known former Congressman who idolized the Founding Fathers. Lincoln thought that the Declaration of Independence expressed the highest principles of the American Revolution, and that the Founding Fathers had tolerated slavery with the expectation that it would ultimately wither away. For the United States to legitimize the expansion of slavery in the Kansas–Nebraska Act, thought Lincoln, was to repudiate the principles of the Revolution. In his October 1854 Peoria speech, Lincoln said:

Nearly eighty years ago we began by declaring that all men are created equal; but now from that beginning we have run down to the other declaration, that for some men to enslave others is a "sacred right of self-government". ... Our republican robe is soiled and trailed in the dust. ... Let us repurify it. Let us re-adopt the Declaration of Independence, and with it, the practices, and policy, which harmonize with it. ... If we do this, we shall not only have saved the Union: but we shall have saved it, as to make, and keep it, forever worthy of the saving.

The meaning of the Declaration was a recurring topic in the famed debates between Lincoln and Stephen Douglas in 1858. Douglas argued that the phrase "all men are created equal", which appears in the Declaration, referred to white men only. The purpose of the Declaration, he said, had simply been to justify the independence of the United States, and not to proclaim the equality of any "inferior or degraded race". Lincoln, however, thought that the language of the Declaration was deliberately universal, setting a high moral standard to which the American republic should aspire. "I had thought the Declaration contemplated the progressive improvement in the condition of all men everywhere", he said. During the seventh and last joint debate with Stephen Douglas at Alton, Illinois, on October 15, 1858, Lincoln said about the declaration:

I think the authors of that notable instrument intended to include all men, but they did not mean to declare all men equal in all respects. They did not mean to say all men were equal in color, size, intellect, moral development, or social capacity. They defined with tolerable distinctness in what they did consider all men created equal—equal in "certain inalienable rights, among which are life, liberty, and the pursuit of happiness." This they said, and this they meant. They did not mean to assert the obvious untruth that all were then actually enjoying that equality, or yet that they were about to confer it immediately upon them. In fact, they had no power to confer such a boon. They meant simply to declare the right, so that the enforcement of it might follow as fast as circumstances should permit. They meant to set up a standard maxim for free society which should be familiar to all, constantly looked to, constantly labored for, and even, though never perfectly attained, constantly approximated, and thereby constantly spreading and deepening its influence, and augmenting the happiness and value of life to all people, of all colors, everywhere.

According to Pauline Maier, Douglas's interpretation was more historically accurate, but Lincoln's view ultimately prevailed. "In Lincoln's hands," wrote Maier, "the Declaration of Independence became first and foremost a living document" with "a set of goals to be realized over time".

[T]here is no reason in the world why the negro is not entitled to all the natural rights enumerated in the Declaration of Independence, the right to life, liberty, and the pursuit of happiness. I hold that he is as much entitled to these as the white man.

— Abraham Lincoln, 1858

Like Daniel Webster, James Wilson, and Joseph Story before him, Lincoln argued that the Declaration of Independence was a founding document of the United States, and that this had important implications for interpreting the Constitution, which had been ratified more than a decade after the Declaration. The Constitution did not use the word "equality", yet Lincoln believed that the concept that "all men are created equal" remained a part of the nation's founding principles. He famously expressed this belief, referencing the year 1776, in the opening sentence of his 1863 Gettysburg Address: "Four score and seven years ago our fathers brought forth on this continent, a new nation, conceived in Liberty, and dedicated to the proposition that all men are created equal."

Lincoln's view of the Declaration became influential, seeing it as a moral guide to interpreting the Constitution. "For most people now," wrote Garry Wills in 1992, "the Declaration means what Lincoln told us it means, as a way of correcting the Constitution itself without overthrowing it." Admirers of Lincoln such as Harry V. Jaffa praised this development. Critics of Lincoln, notably Willmoore Kendall and Mel Bradford, argued that Lincoln dangerously expanded the scope of the national government and violated states' rights by reading the Declaration into the Constitution.

=== Women's suffrage and the Declaration ===
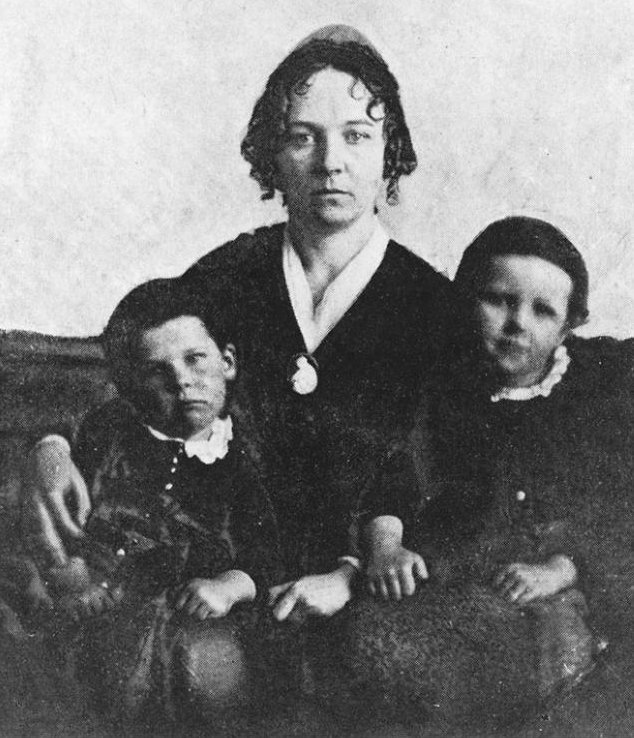
Elizabeth Cady Stanton and her two sons in 1848

In July 1848, the Seneca Falls Convention was held in Seneca Falls, New York, the first women's rights convention. It was organized by Elizabeth Cady Stanton, Lucretia Mott, Mary Ann McClintock, and Jane Hunt. They patterned their "Declaration of Sentiments" on the Declaration of Independence, in which they demanded social and political equality for women. Their motto was that "All men and women are created equal", and they demanded the right to vote. Excerpt from "Declaration of Sentiments":

We hold these truths to be self-evident, that all men and women are created equal

— The Declaration of Rights and Sentiments 1848

=== Civil Rights Movement and the Declaration ===
In 1963, at the March on Washington for Jobs and Freedom in Washington, D.C., Martin Luther King Jr. delivered his famous "I Have a Dream" speech. This speech was meant to inspire the nation, to take up the causes of the Civil Rights Movement. King uses quotations from the Declaration of Independence to encourage equal treatment of all persons regardless of race.

Excerpt from King's speech:

I have a dream that one day this nation will rise up and live out the true meaning of its creed: "We hold these truths to be self-evident: that all men are created equal."

— Martin Luther King, Jr., 1963

In 1966, Black Panther Party founders Huey P. Newton and Bobby Seale quoted the Declaration's preamble in its entirety in the party's Ten-Point Program—for the tenth point, "We want land, bread, housing, education, clothing, justice, peace and people's community control of modern technology". The Black Panthers were dedicated to community organizing for self-defense and mutual benefit among working-class Black people, and the Ten-Point Program was intended to serve as a concise statement of what the Panthers organization hoped to achieve for Black people, including full employment, decent housing, freedom from compulsory military service, and an end to police brutality.

=== LGBTQ+ rights movement and the Declaration ===
In 1978, at the Gay Pride Celebration in San Francisco, activist and later politician Harvey Milk delivered a speech. Milk alluded to the Declaration of Independence, emphasizing that the inalienable rights established by the Declaration apply to all persons and cannot be hindered because of one's sexual orientation.

Excerpt from Milk's speech:

All men are created equal and they are endowed with certain inalienable rights... that's what America is. No matter how hard you try, you cannot erase those words from the Declaration of Independence.

— Harvey Milk, 1978

=== 20th century and later ===
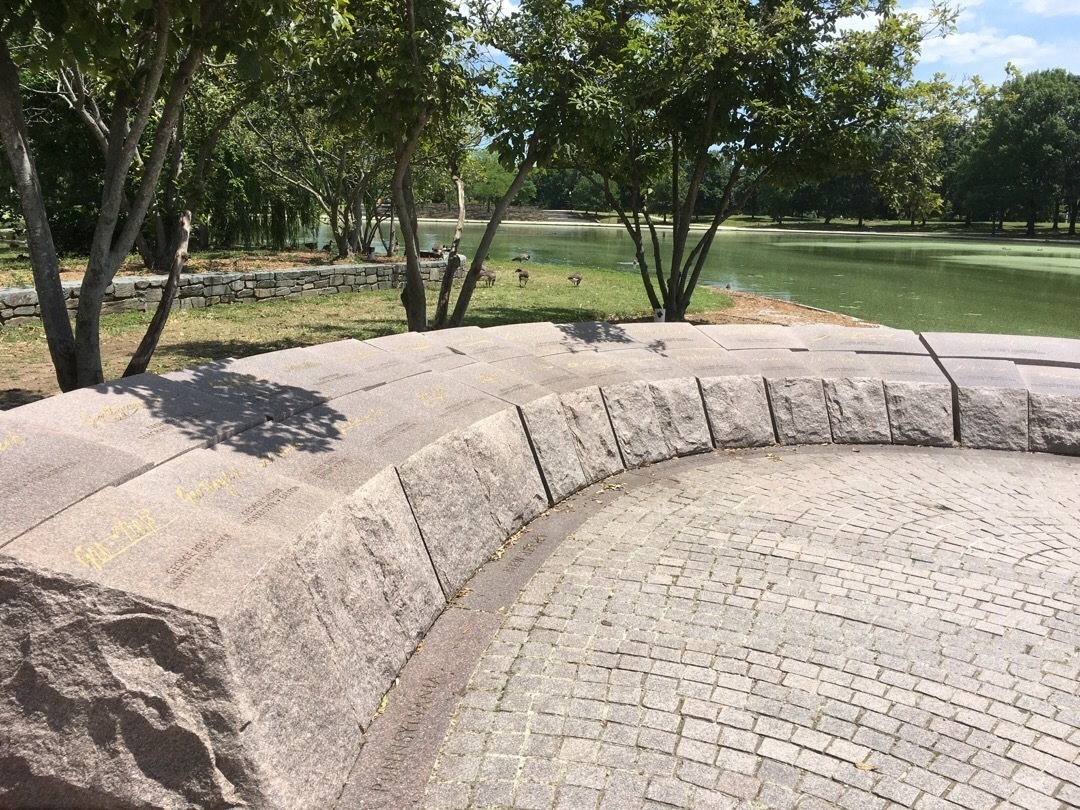
The Memorial to the 56 Signers of the Declaration of Independence in Washington, D.C.'s Constitution Gardens

The Declaration was one of the first texts to be made into an ebook (1971).

The Memorial to the 56 Signers of the Declaration of Independence was dedicated in 1984 in Constitution Gardens on the National Mall in Washington, D.C., where the signatures of all the original signers are carved in stone with their names, places of residence, and occupations.

The new One World Trade Center building in New York City (2014) is 1776 feet high to symbolize the year that the Declaration of Independence was signed.

=== Popular culture ===
The adoption of the Declaration of Independence was dramatized in the 1938 Academy Award–winning short film Declaration of Independence, the 1969 Tony Award–winning musical 1776, the 1972 film version, and the 2008 television miniseries John Adams. In 1970, The 5th Dimension recorded the opening of the Declaration on their 1970 album Portrait in the song "Declaration". It was first performed on The Ed Sullivan Show on December 7, 1969, and it was taken as a song of protest by some opposed to the Vietnam War.

The original handwritten and signed Declaration of Independence is a plot device in the 2004 American film National Treasure.

The 2008 video game Fallout 3 involves a quest in which the playable character acquires the Declaration of Independence from the National Archives. The player is tasked with bringing the document back to a history lover who wants to reclaim pieces of America following a nuclear war.

After the 2009 death of radio broadcaster Paul Harvey, Focus Today aired a clip of Harvey speaking about the lives of all the signers of the Declaration of Independence.

== See also ==
- Influence of the American Revolution on the French Revolution
- Journals of the Continental Congress
- Signers Monument
