= Beerwolf =

German folk-tale monster

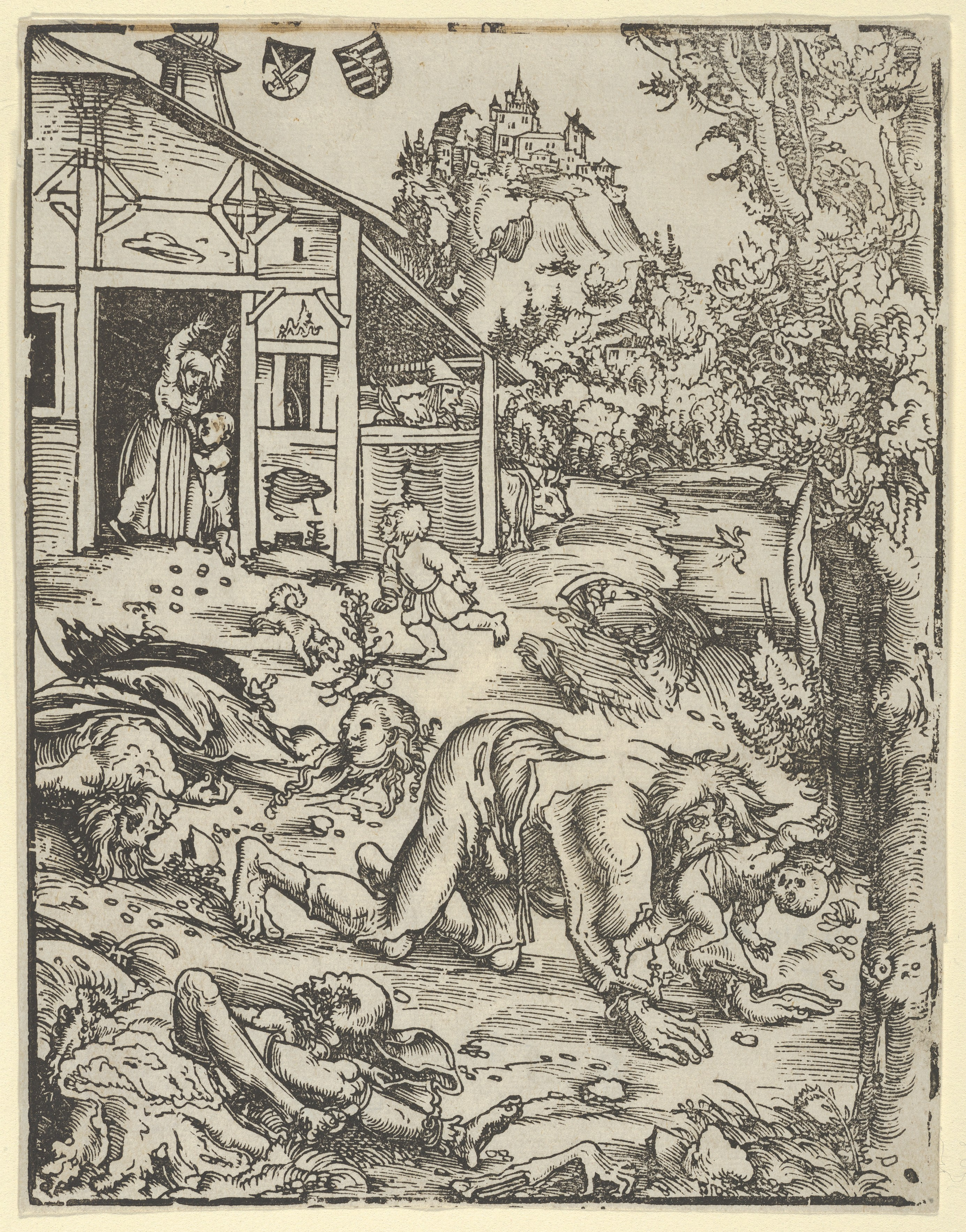
Woodcut of a werewolf attack by Lucas Cranach the Elder, 1512

A Beerwolf (Bärwolf, Werwolf) is a German folk-tale monster commonly known as a werewolf.

In a debate arranged by Philip of Hesse and the Elector of Saxony in 1539, when it appeared the Holy Roman Emperor Charles V was readying to attack the Lutherans, Martin Luther introduced the concept of Beerwolf to describe the Pope and the Emperor. In the context of resistance theory, the Beerwolf, "in contrast to a mere tyrant, not only broke the law, but overturned the entire moral order upon which it is based. All the subjects of such a ruler ... had the right to resist and even to kill him and all his supporters". The point was that Luther thought the Emperor and the Pope were just such apocalyptic tyrants, and that the present situation justified all efforts to resist them. Despite this Luther continued to resist armed religious conflict against the Emperor and Pope, the Schmalkaldic War beginning a year after his death.

The significance of the term lies in the fact that, for most of his life, Luther held that no subject could actively resist his secular ruler, an issue of obvious significance in a time when many rulers in the German lands and their respective subjects held competing religious beliefs. The concept of Beerwolf marked Luther's final, and most extreme, position on resistance theory, as it relied on natural law (specifically, in a similar manner to what would later be called Hobbes' right to self-preservation) instead of earlier and more limited rights to resistance that Luther had accepted as flowing from German constitutional law.

The 1550 Magdeburg Confession included a Beerwolf clause that had to be fulfilled before an evil ruler could be resisted by the lesser magistrates.

The concept of just rebellion that the term Beerwolf introduced was subsequently developed by fellow Protestants who faced a similar situation in France, the Huguenot Monarchomachs.

== See also ==
- Right of rebellion
