= Resistance theory in the early modern period =

Aspect of political thought

Resistance theory is an aspect of political thought, discussing the basis on which constituted authority may be resisted, by individuals or groups. In the European context it came to prominence as a consequence of the religious divisions in the early modern period that followed the Protestant Reformation. Resistance theories could justify disobedience on religious grounds to monarchs, and were significant in European national politics and international relations in the century leading up to the Peace of Westphalia of 1648. They can also underpin and justify the concept of revolution as now understood. The resistance theory of the early modern period can be considered to predate the formulations of natural and legal rights of citizens, and to co-exist with considerations of natural law.

Any "right to resist" is a theory about the limitations on civil obedience. Resistance theory is an aspect of political theory; the right of self-defence is usually taken to be a part of legal theory, and was no novelty in the early modern period. Arguments about the two concepts do overlap, and the distinction is not so clear in debates.

== The language of magistracy ==
Resistance theory has been formulated as "resistance to the magistrate", where magistrate stands for authority in the legal form. In effect "magistrate" here may stand for head of state, but the modern concept of state grew up alongside the early modern resistance theories, rather than preceding them. Reference was made, for example by Althusius to classical history: to the ephors of the Spartan Constitution, as "lesser magistrates", or to the optimates of the late Roman Republic.

== Christian resistance theories of the early modern period ==
The various strands did not develop separately, and drew on pre-Reformation thinkers as well as contemporaries.

=== Lutheran resistance theory ===
It is argued that the beginnings of Protestant resistance theory lay in the legal positions worked out after the 1530 Diet of Augsburg, by jurists working for the Electorate of Saxony and the Landgraviate of Hesse. A summary on Lutheran ideas about resistance was included with the 1550 Magdeburg Confession. It argues that the "subordinate powers" in a state, faced with the situation where the "supreme power" is working to destroy true religion, under very specific circumstances (such as when the Beerwolf clause is fulfilled) may go further than non-cooperation with the supreme power and assist the faithful to resist.

=== Calvinist resistance theory ===
The mainstream ideas from the Magdeburg Confession recur in Calvinist writings, from 1558 onwards. A little before that development come statements of John Ponet, Christopher Goodman and John Knox (The Monstruous Regiment of Women). The annotations of the Geneva Bible pointed to exemplars of resistance theory (and were not unique in that).

The literature includes but is not limited to the Huguenot resistance theory of the French Wars of Religion. Theodore Beza produced the 1574 work Right of Magistrates; it was followed by the anonymous Vindiciae contra tyrannos (1579). Resistance theory also became important for the justification of the Dutch Revolt. In the Politica (1603) of Johannes Althusius, one of the occasions justifying resistance to a supreme magistrate by inferior magistrates (roughly, members of the "ruling class"), in the case of tyranny, is for a prince or group of rulers of provinces, extended to the provincial "authorities", this matching the situation of the Revolt. Althusius was closer to Zwingli than Calvin in his approach, in fact, and clarified his views on church and state in successive editions.

Hugo Grotius, expelled from the Dutch Reformed Church because of his Remonstrant views, altered the question of resistance theory in two ways. In De jure belli ac pacis he argued against the distinction from the right of self-defence and accountable government. But he also modified the question, influentially, to include the removal of private warfare from political society (an issue of pacification).

=== Catholic resistance theory ===
In the French context, Catholic resistance theory grew on the ultramontanism of the time, and developed through controversy and political alignment. This situation came about because the opposite "cismontane" tendency, Gallicanism, came to be allied with the politiques, and the royalist view tending to divine right. Therefore, the opponents of the monarchs Henry III and Henry IV in France, in the Catholic League, came to reason in favour of the limitations on royal power that their opponents denied. The position after the Council of Trent left the Jesuits opposed to the "liberties" claimed by the Gallican Church, and defenders of ultramontanism. The tradition of the papal deposing power was defended, in indirect form, by Robert Bellarmine in 1586, which amounted to validating some resistance by subjects; in reply Louis Servin in 1591 wrote a vindication in extreme form of Gallican liberties.

=== Resistance theory and the Church of England ===
The Church of England after the Elizabethan Settlement was a church open to Calvinist ideas, rather than a Calvinist church: Reformed theology was accepted on a piecemeal basis. The 1568 Bishops' Bible contained annotations with political content similar to those in the Geneva Bible. Thomas Bilson published in 1585 The True Difference betweene Christian Subiection and Unchristian Rebellion, in the context of the Treaty of Nonsuch between England and the United Provinces. It was reprinted in 1643, at the outbreak of the First English Civil War. Bilson argued against religion alone as a basis for resistance, so discounting the resistance theories of Christopher Goodman, John Knox and Huldrich Zwingli as politically based.

In The True Law of Free Monarchies (1598), James VI of Scotland set out his views on the relationship of king and subjects, against the current contractarian theories and especially the resistance theory of George Buchanan, who had been his tutor. Besides theoretical reasons for denying what Buchanan had written in De juri regni apud Scotos (1579), and dedicated to James, he felt that Buchanan had used Scottish history to support his claims only by misprision; and those views led to disorder. These opinions he did not vary on becoming king in England five years later; as for religious strife he was a conciliarist of an older tradition, in harmony with the views of Richard Hooker. Hooker's actual views on resistance theory were careful; he criticised aspects of the Vindiciae contra tyrannos, but avoided commenting in particular on legitimate resistance. Churchmen who would later be seen as poles apart on theology, Thomas Morton and David Owen, wrote in the period 1605–10 on resistance theory in a way equating it with a Catholic tradition; Owen commented that the analogy general council is to papacy as peers to monarchy is false.

By the time of the reign of Charles I, other considerations had come to matter more. Arminianism in the Church of England had become a source of great tension. But in theological terms Arminianism was compatible with divine right, as it was with resistance theory. The argument on resistance was going on elsewhere.

== Resistance theory and the English Civil war ==
A context for resistance theory in England was in the theoretical discussions of common law about how to incorporate monarchy into the "ancient constitution". Political conflicts that were stoked up by the outbreak of the Thirty Years' War took place in the 1620s with a shared consensus assumption against the legitimacy of resistance. It has been argued that the theorising from the late sixteenth century on the English ancient constitution was an "antidote" to resistance theory.

Conrad Russell's biography of John Pym in the Oxford Dictionary of National Biography comments that, while Pym almost certainly was familiar with resistance theory in its Protestant form, around the time in early 1642 when the First English Civil War was breaking out, he was too good a politician to show that he knew it. Russell has also argued that the Parliamentarians were almost completely successful in avoiding formulating a resistance theory.

== Whig resistance theory ==
The Whig faction was founded at the time of the Exclusion Crisis around 1680 in British politics, and its initial purpose was to resist the legitimate succession to the throne of James, Duke of York. "Whig resistance theory" had numerous strands, in particular when compared with the opposing legitimists (Jacobites) and the other major political faction, the Tories who advocated passive obedience as dissent, and as a definite limitation on resistance theories supported only passive resistance, indeed preferring nonresistance. John Locke's Two Treatises of Government, written at the time of the Exclusion Crisis but published after the Glorious Revolution, went back to the Calvinist resistance theory as in George Buchanan. Algernon Sidney like Locke replied to the Patriarcha of Robert Filmer, and provided a thorough animadversion.

The trial in 1710 of Henry Sacheverell, a High Church and High Tory cleric, brought Whig resistance theories into prominence and focus, by generating a controversial literature. These developments broke apart any semblance of unity in Anglican resistance theory. Constantine Phipps defended Sacheverell, and Benjamin Hoadley who was an extreme Whig in his The Original and Institution of Civil Government Discuss'd (1710), made opposite and incompatible claims about the treatment of resistance in Richard Hooker, who by now was an iconic figure in Anglican theology.

== See also ==
- Tyrant
- Tyrannicide
- Popular sovereignty
