= Lesser magistrate =

Protestant doctrine

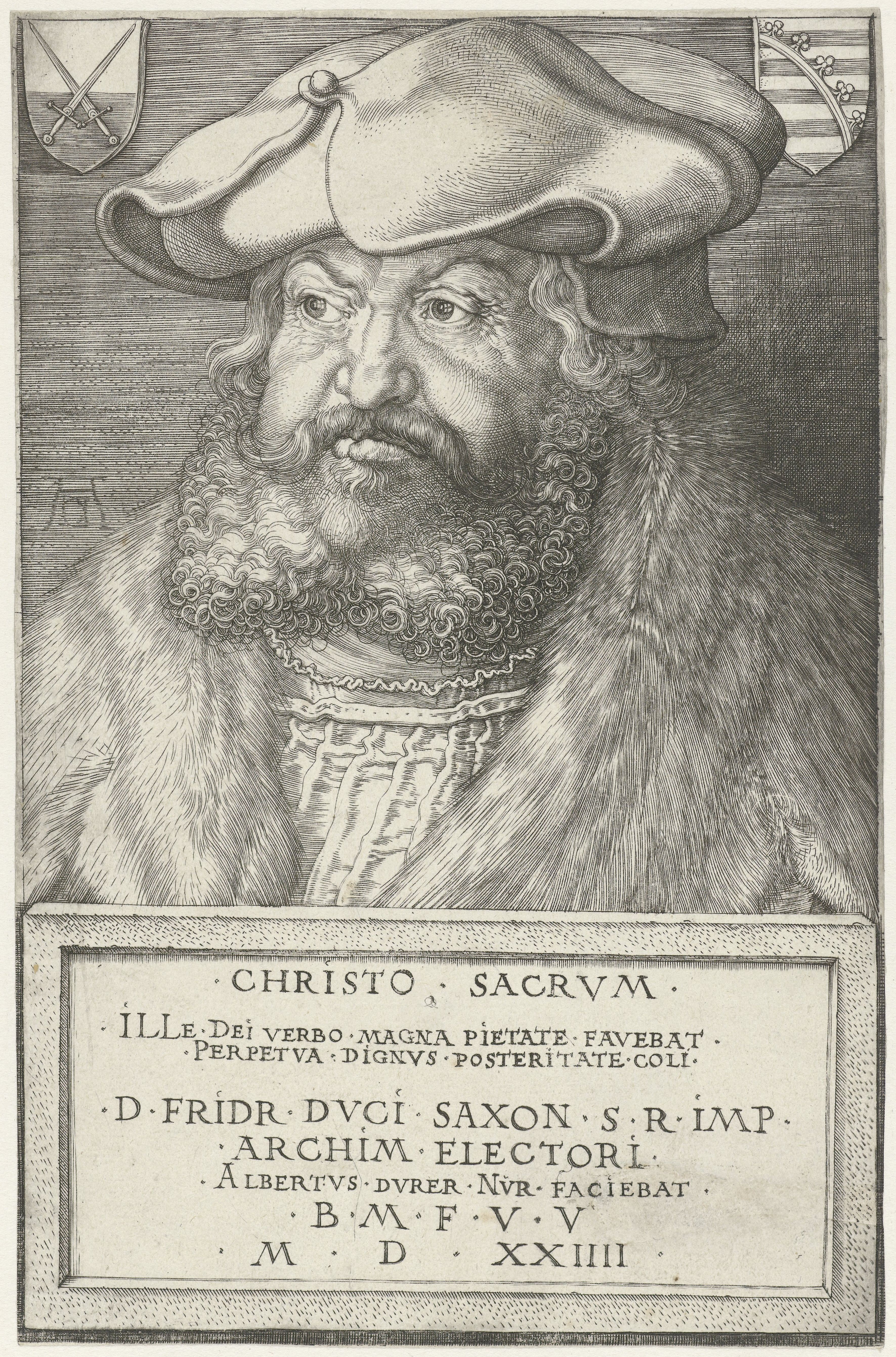
Frederick III, Elector of Saxony, who protected Martin Luther, was a "lesser magistrate" under Emperor Charles V.

The doctrine of the lesser magistrate is a concept in Protestant thought. A lesser magistrate is a ruler such as a prince who is under a greater ruler such as an emperor. The doctrine of the lesser magistrate is a legal system explaining the exact circumstances in which a lesser magistrate has both the right and the responsibility to resist the greater ruler.

The doctrine of the lesser magistrate is dependent on the private citizen argument from before the Reformation, which stated that any evil done by an officeholder is committed as a private citizen, rather than by the office.

The use of the doctrine of the lesser magistrates carries with it the possibility of violence and war.

== Reformation ==
The doctrine of the lesser magistrate was first popularized in a simpler form by John Calvin, who wrote that private Christians must submit to the ruling authorities, but there may be "popular magistrates" who have "been appointed to curb the tyranny of kings". When these magistrates "connive at kings when they tyrannise and insult over the humbler of the people" they "fraudulently betray the liberty of the people" when God has appointed them guardians of that liberty.

A more elaborate doctrine of the lesser magistrate was first employed in the Lutheran Magdeburg Confession of 1550, which argued that the "subordinate powers" in a state, faced with the situation where the "supreme power" is working to destroy true religion, may go further than non-cooperation with the supreme power and assist the faithful to resist. This work drew heavily on Luther, including his Beerwolf concept as one of multiple conditions an evil ruler would need to fulfill before opposition to his rule could be justified. In other words, even though an evil ruler is acting as a private citizen, he still may not be resisted unless all of the other conditions are fulfilled. One of them was that the evil ruler must show himself to be a true Beerwolf and servant of the devil.

Variations on this doctrine of the lesser magistrate were commonly taught by orthodox Calvinists such as Theodore Beza. The doctrine of the lesser magistrate became important for the justification of the Dutch Revolt. According to Johannes Althusius in 1603 work, Politica, resistance to a supreme magistrate by lesser magistrates is justified in the case of tyranny. Althusius argued that the provincial authorities of the United Provinces were in this situation.

Gary M. Simpson suggests that after the St. Bartholomew's Day massacre in 1572 there was a "populist expansion" of the doctrine in which "the ruled would no longer be merely the subject of the ruler; they would become citizens." Nicholas Wolterstorff argues that for citizens of liberal democracies, "some of the responsibilities belonging to the lesser magistrates of Calvin's day belong to us," but that on Calvin's view we do not "have the right to engage in civil disobedience or armed resistance."

== Later developments of the concept ==
Following the spread of Hegelianism, the doctrine of the lesser magistrate became less important. This is because in Hegel's thought, authority within a society could bleed in at all levels, not just from the top executive down through a hierarchy, even though the philosopher noted that in matters of national importance, there must be a top executive to decide.

== See also ==
- Resistance theory in the Early Modern period
- Monarchomachs
- Interposition
- Nullification (U.S. Constitution)
