= Magdeburg Confession =

1550 Lutheran statement of faith

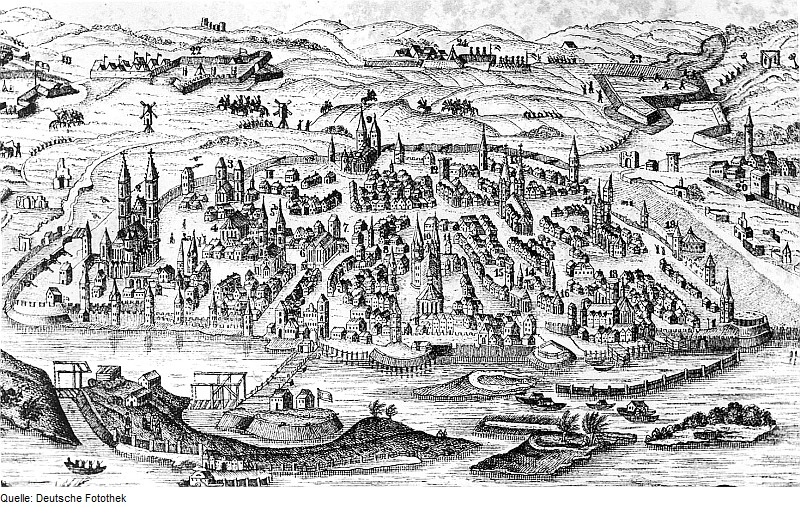
Magdeburg in 1551

The Magdeburg Confession (officially, the Confession, Instruction, and Admonition of the pastors and preachers of the Christian congregations of Magdeburg) was a Lutheran statement of faith. It was written by nine pastors of the city of Magdeburg in 1550 in response to the Augsburg Interim and the imposition of Roman Catholicism. The Confession explains why the leaders of the city refused to obey the imperial law, and were prepared to resist its implementation with force if necessary. The Magdeburg Confession calls for resistance to political tyranny, and argues that the "subordinate powers" in a state, faced with the situation where the "supreme power" is working to destroy true religion, may go further than non-cooperation with the supreme power and assist the faithful to resist.

Carter Lindberg calls it "the first Protestant religious justification of the right of defense against unjust higher authorities." John Witte notes that Theodore Beza saw the Magdeburg Confession as an example of how to respond to political abuse of tyranny, and that it was a "major distillation of the most advanced Lutheran resistance theories of the day, which the Calvinist tradition absorbed."
