= Provincial troops in the French and Indian Wars =

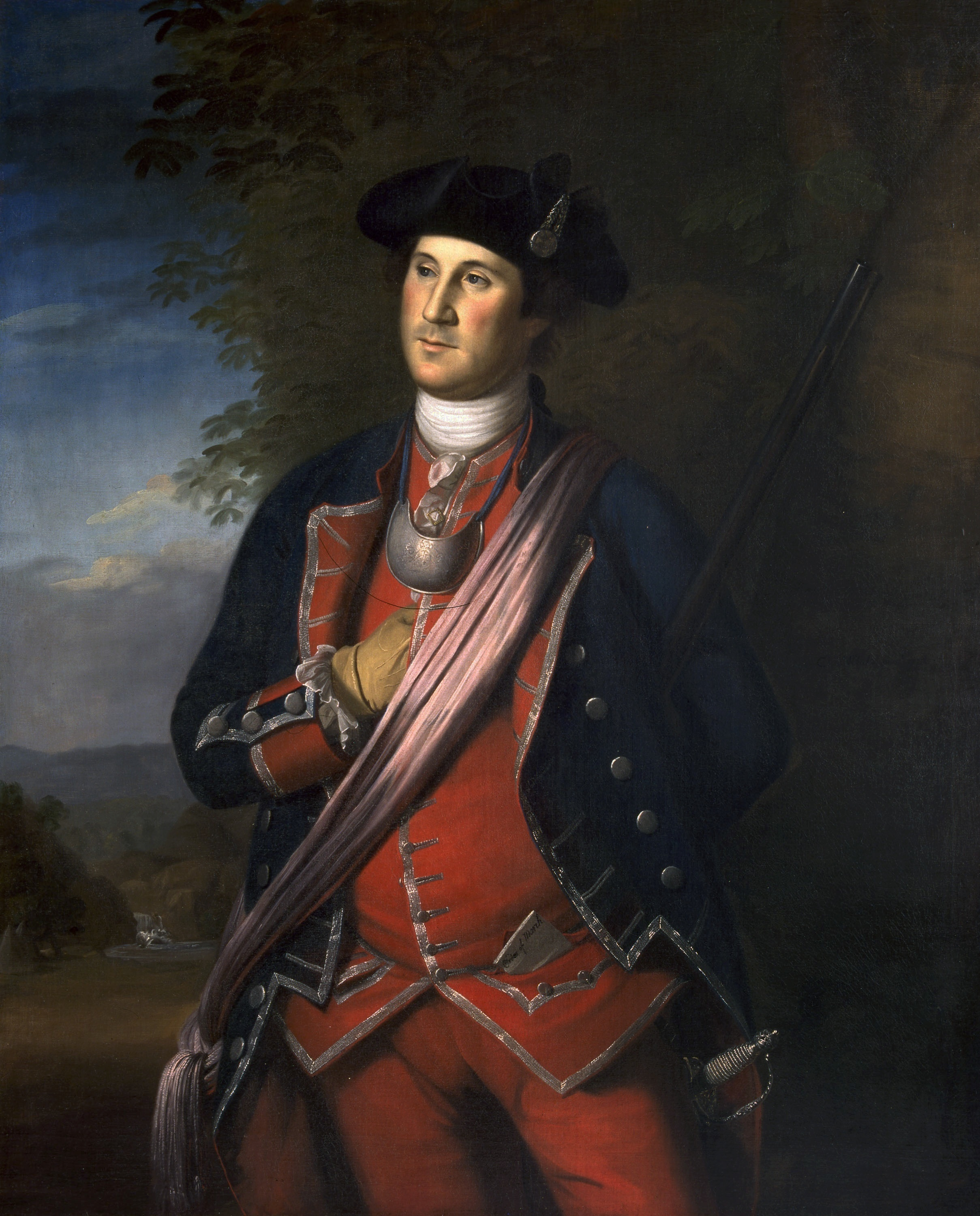
1772 portrait of George Washington as colonel of the Virginia Regiment

Provincial troops were military units raised by colonial governors and legislatures in British America for extended operations during the 18th century. The provincial troops differed from the militia, in that they were a full-time military organization conducting extended operations. They differed from the regular British Army in that they were recruited only for one campaign season at the time. These forces were often recruited through a quota system applied to the militia. Officers were appointed by the provincial governments. During the eighteenth century militia service was increasingly seen as a prerogative of the social and economic well-established, while provincial troops came to be recruited from different and less deep-rooted members of the community.

The first provincial forces in British North America were organized in the 1670s. The major operations during King William's War were conducted by provincial troops from Massachusetts Bay. During Queen Anne's War provincial troops from Massachusetts Bay, Connecticut, and New Hampshire made up the bulk of the English forces. During King George's War the land forces that took Louisbourg were entirely supplied by Massachusetts, Connecticut, New Hampshire, and Rhode Island. During the French and Indian War the imperial government in London took an increasingly more leading part, relegating the provincial troops to a non-combat role, largely as pioneers and transportation troops, while the bulk of the fighting was done by the regular British Army. However the contributions of Connecticut, Massachusetts Bay, New Hampshire, and Rhode Island were essential.

== Organization ==
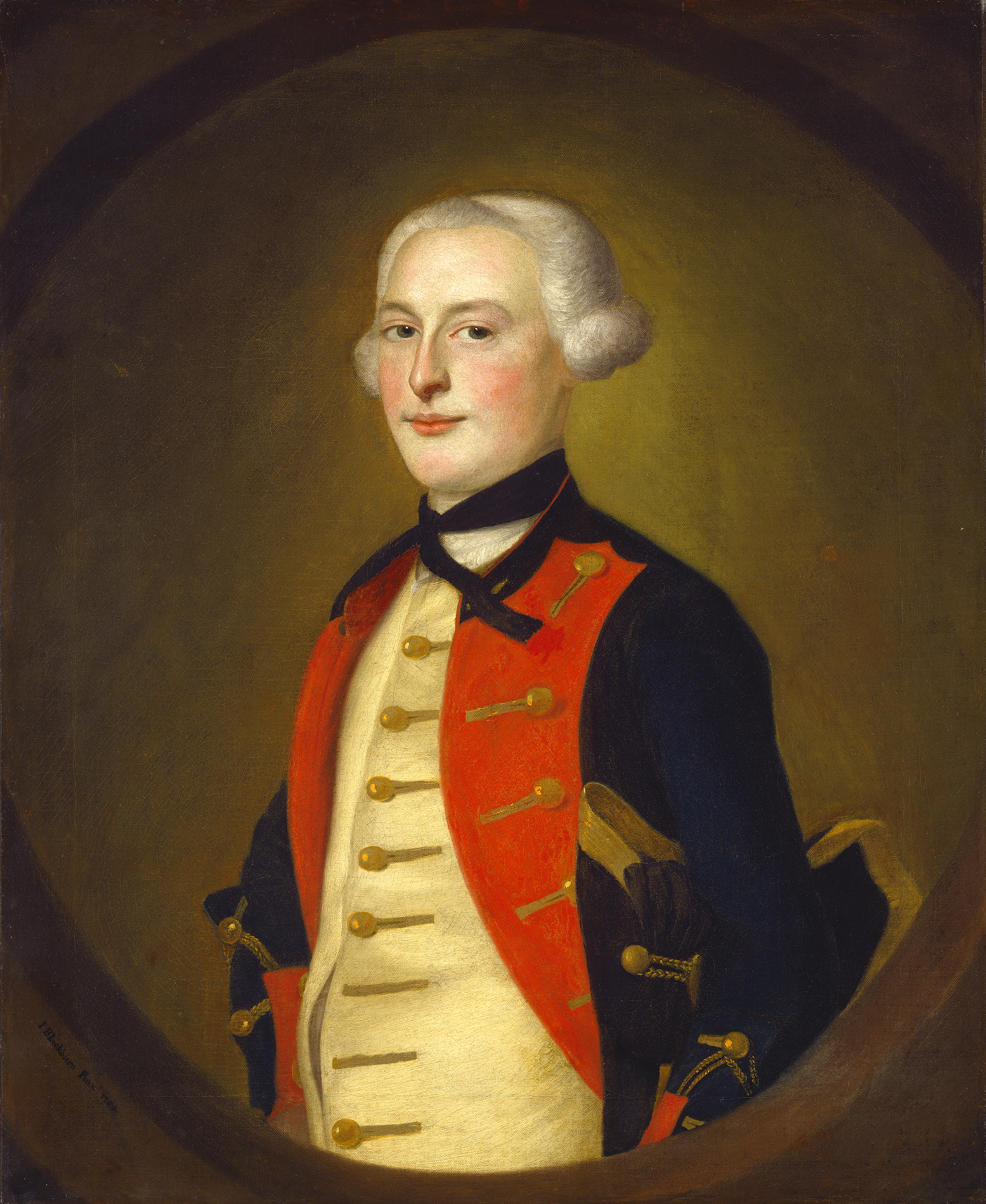
1756 portrait of a Massachusetts provincial officer

Those Men, posted on the Frontier, are not the Militia, but what we call our Provincial Troops, being regularly inlisted to serve for a Term, and in the Pay of the Province; and do nothing but bear Arms like your Regulars.

— Benjamin Franklin, 1756.

During the French and Indian Wars, provincial troops separate of the militia were raised by the colonial governors and legislatures for extended operations. These forces were often recruited through a quota system applied to the militia; drafts would only be used when enough volunteers didn't sign up. Bounties were used to boast volunteer enlistment. The officers were appointed by the provincial governments; the field officers were mostly men of political importance and members of the legislatures with many years service in the militia, while the junior officers were efficient and popular militia officers. The provincial troops were enlisted for specific campaign seasons, and organized anew each spring, yet most of the officers served year after year. The colonial governments also appointed persons in charge of logistics, often prominent merchants who had the business acumen and knowledge to run the extensive logistic operations required.

The distinction between the militia and the provincial troops was not always understood in contemporary Britain, and Benjamin Franklin tried to explain the differences in a 1756 letter to his English friend Peter Collinson. The men serving on the frontier, Franklin clarified, were not militia but full-time soldiers enlisted to fight for a specific period of time, and paid by the colonial governments. In contrast, the militia were men following their normal business, mustering on specific days to train, and ready to fight only in case of an emergency. Massachusetts Bay was the colony that made the largest contribution to the war effort during the French and Indian Wars. In the seventeenth century provincial forces were first raised for offensive operations through volunteers from the militia regiments. After King William's War, the colonial legislature enacted new laws that embodied the basic principles that would govern the colony's military forces during a century of warfare. The militia's role was relegated from a prospective combat force, to "a combination of home guard, draft-board, and [...] supply network," forming the base from which the provincial troops were recruited and supplied.

== Recruitment and social composition ==
During the eighteenth century militia service was increasingly seen as a prerogative of the social and economic well-established, while provincial troops came to be recruited from different and less deep-rooted members of the community. Legislation often excluded several categories of men from the militia that the colonial governments were perfectly willing to enlist as provincial troops, such as settled Indians, free persons of color, servants, and vagrants. The provincial troops were recruited from the elements of the population that were easiest to do without; young men without property, with no stake in the society. In order to fill the quotas assigned to them by the imperial government, the several colonies used bounties as carrots, and draft as a stick. Offering money induced propertyless men to enlist, while the draft often was directed at the elements of society that the colonial governments saw as problematic, such as vagrants or disorderly young men. Drafted men could hire substitutes, and they were most often belonging to the least well-established groups. Those who were recruited to the provincial troops in Connecticut and Virginia were men that had been outside the organized militia and hence lacking the social status suggested by militia membership. But in Massachusetts the provincial soldiers came from segments of the population more reflective of the society at large, although research done only covers the first year of the French and Indian War and it's possible that the social composition changed over time.

== Comparison between militia, associators, provincial troops, and regulars ==
	Organized militia	Associators	Provincial troops	British Army
Combat role	Home guard	Home guard in the Province of Pennsylvania, in lieu of a militia	Extended operations within the North American theater of operations	Extended operations without global geographical limitations.
Main occupation	Civilian	Civilian	Military	Military
Enlistment	In theory all able-bodied men, but in reality only those who could equip, pay and subsist themselves.	Only those who could equip, pay and subsist themselves.	In theory only volunteers, but sometimes drafted men.	In theory only volunteers, but sometimes also men raised through impressment.
Service obligation	Part-time; 16–60 years of age	Part-time; 16–60 years of age	Full-time; one campaign season	Full-time; life, although during the French and Indian war, also for three years or for the duration of the war.
Articles of War	No	No	Only when in conjoint operations with the British army	Yes
Pay	Unpaid Militiaman	Unpaid Volunteer	Colonial government	Crown
Clothing	Militiaman himself	Volunteer himself	Colonial government	Crown
Arms and equipment	Militiaman himself	Volunteer himself	Colonial government; Crown from 1758.	Crown
Subsistence	Militiaman himself	Volunteer himself	Colonial government; Crown during conjoint operations with the British Army.	Crown

== King William's War ==
The first provincial forces in British North America were organized in the 1670s, when several colonial governments raised ranger companies for one year's paid service to protect their borders.

=== Port Royal 1690 ===
Port Royal in French Acadia was taken in 1690, by one provincial regiment of foot from Massachusetts under William Phips. The regiment was organized in seven companies and contained 446 officers and men at the time of the French surrender, although it had a strength of about 700 when leaving Boston.

=== Quebec 1690 ===
The land forces of the Quebec Expedition 1690 were entirely composed of provincial troops from Massachusetts under William Phipps. The 2,300 foot soldiers were organized in four regiments and one Indian company:

- Essex Regiment
- Middlesex Regiment
- Suffolk Regiment
- Plymouth Regiment

== Queen Anne's War ==
=== Carolina and Florida ===
Most combat operations of the province of Carolina during Queen Anne's War were conducted by Indian allies, such as the Yamasee and the Creeks, although Carolinians participated in the St. Augustine expedition 1702 and defense of Charles Town 1706. The militia, which in war time included armed slaves, was supplemented by a small provincial full-time force of garrison troops and rangers.

=== Port Royal 1707 ===
The expeditions to Port Royal in 1707 were made up entirely of provincial troops from Massachusetts Bay, New Hampshire, and Rhode Island:

- The First or Red Regiment, twelve companies in red uniforms, under Colonel Francis Wainwright of Ipswich, Massachusetts.
- The Second or Blue Regiment, eleven regiments in blue uniforms, under Winthrop Hilton of Exeter, New Hampshire.

=== Port Royal 1710 ===
The expedition to Port Royal in 1710 contained both regular troops from the British Army, and four provincial regiments from Massachusetts Bay, Connecticut, and New Hampshire:

- Hobby's Regiment (Massachusetts Bay), a Boston regiment under Colonel Sir Charles Hobby of Boston, Massachusetts.
- Tailer's Regiment (ditto), under Colonel William Tailer of Dorchester, Massachusetts.
- Whiting's Regiment (Connecticut), under Colonel William Whiting of Hartford, Connecticut.
- Walton's Regiment (New Hampshire), under Colonel Shadrach Walton of New Castle, New Hampshire.

=== Quebec 1711 ===
In addition to the regular troops of the British Army, the expedition to Quebec 1711 contained two provincial regiments from Massachusetts Bay, Rhode Island, and New Hampshire:

- Vetch's Regiment (Massachusetts Bay), under Colonel Samuel Vetch of Boston, Massachusetts.
- Walton's Regiment (Rhode Island-New Hampshire), under Colonel Shadrach Walton of Portsmouth, New Hampshire.

== War of Jenkins's Ear ==
The militia was the ultimate line of defense for the province of Georgia. Yet it was too small, and its members too occupied in civil pursuits, to efficiently protect the colony. James Oglethorpe therefore created a small paid provincial force of "soldiers recruited for combat," containing a Highland company and some 130 rangers, as well as boatmen manning scout boats and some smaller ships. During Oglethorpe's offensive against Spanish Florida, the siege of St. Augustine, and the battle of Fort Mose, the British force contained the Georgia provincials and a provincial regiment from South Carolina, as well as Oglethorpe's own regiment of the British army. The South Carolina regiment had a strength of 500 soldiers, and was partly recruited in North Carolina and Virginia.

== King George's War ==
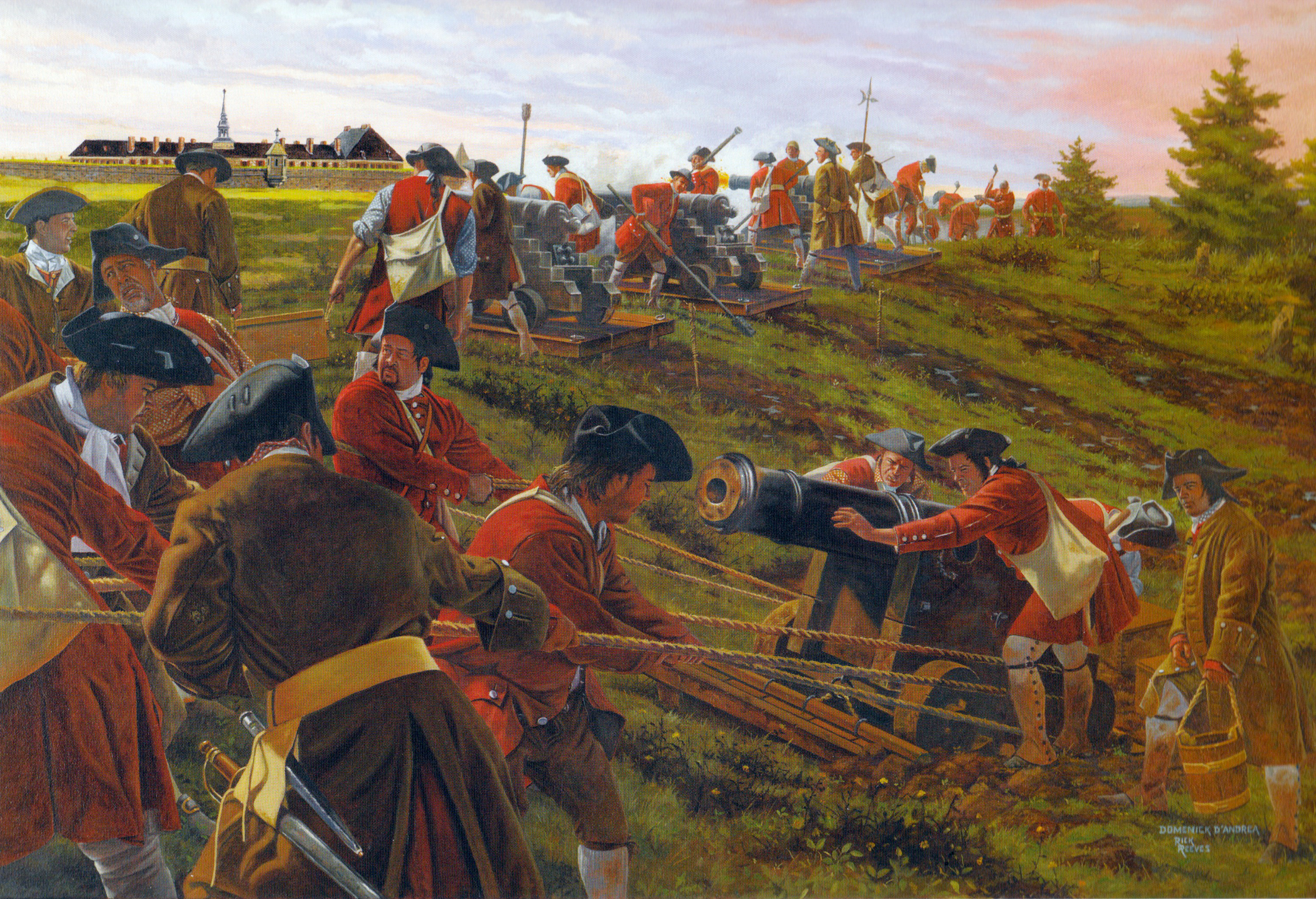
Provincial troops during the siege of Louisbourg in 1745

The land forces of the Louisbourg expedition in 1745 were entirely a colonial affair, with Massachusetts contributing 3,000 provincial soldiers, Connecticut 500, New Hampshire 500, and Rhode Island 300. Pennsylvania had refused to raise any soldiers, but after the fall of the French fortress the province appropriated moneys for the maintenance of an occupying force. For the ultimately aborted intercolonial operation against Canada in 1746, Massachusetts would mobilize 3,500 provincial troops, New York 1,600, Connecticut 1,000, New Hampshire 500, New Jersey 500, Pennsylvania 400, Rhode Island 300, Maryland 300, and Virginia 100.

The province of New Hampshire kept paid ranger units or scouts in provincial service during the whole war, as well as raising five hundred provincial soldiers for the Louisbourg expedition; two hundred of whom served as part of a Massachusetts regiment, while the rest formed a regiment of seven companies:

- Moore's Regiment, under Colonel Samuel Moore of Portsmouth, New Hampshire.

Massachusetts Bay organized seven regiments of foot for the Louisbourg expedition:

- First Massachusetts Regiment, under Colonel William Pepperell of Kittery Point, Maine.
- Second Massachusetts Regiment, under Colonel Samuel Waldo of Boston.
- Third Massachusetts Regiment, under Colonel Jeremiah Moulton of York, Maine.
- Fourth Massachusetts Regiment, under Colonel Samuel Willard of Lancaster, Massachusetts.
- Fifth Massachusetts Regiment, under Colonel Robert Hale of Beverly, Massachusetts.
- Sixth Massachusetts Regiment, under Colonel Sylvester Richmond of Dighton, Massachusetts.
- Seventh Massachusetts Regiment, under Colonel Shubael Gorham of Barnstable, Massachusetts.

King George's War also saw the birth of Gorham's Rangers, a Massachusetts provincial ranger company that was a permanent organization until its disbandment in 1762.

Connecticut participated in the Louisbourg expedition with one regiment:

- Connecticut Regiment, under Colonel Andrew Burr of Fairfield, Connecticut.

Rhode Island and Providence Plantations mobilized three provincial companies for the Louisbourg expedition. The enthusiasm for the undertaking was very low in the province, and it was difficult to fill the ranks of the three companies. The Assembly had to lower the strength of them, from a hundred men each to fifty, in order to complete the recruitment. The Rhode Island contingent was thereby belated by a month, and did not reach Cape Breton Island in time to participate in the siege and victory.

== French and Indian War ==
In 1757 and again in 1758 Prime Minister Pitt requested the northern colonies in British North America to furnish 20,000 men for the coming campaign seasons, and the southern colonies for large, but unspecified numbers. The response to this call was met with varied enthusiasm; Massachusetts, Connecticut, and New York were as always willing to do their share and more. The northern colonies furnished about 17,000 men for 1758 and the following years; the southern colonies much fewer. There were provincial forces participating in the sieges of Louisbourg in 1758 and Quebec in 1759. The British army that operated against Fort Carillon in 1758 contained a majority of provincial troops, although most of the fighting was done by the regulars. The capture of Fort Frontenac in 1758, was done by a force dominantly provincial. The main task of the provincials, with the exception of multiple ranger companies, during this campaign in the war was largely as pioneers, fort garrisons and transportation troops.

=== Connecticut ===
The General Assembly in March 1755 authorized 1,000 men in the pay of Connecticut Colony to be mobilized in late May in two regiments of six companies each. They also empowered the governor to raise 500 additional men should it become necessary. This additional force was raised at the end of August in consequence of letters received from Major-General William Johnson. These six companies were added to the two regiments already raised. Around the end of August, the General Assembly authorized the raising and payment of two additional regiments to be mobilized in September, each to consist of 750 men divided into nine companies.

According to the future Governor and then militia Colonel Jonathan Trumbull, by October 1755, a total of 3,975 Connecticut militia had been mobilized and sent to four fronts. Some 900 of these were paid by Massachusetts and New York and placed in their regiments, but served under their own captains.

- 300 were "gone to Nova Scotia" to join Lieutenant-Colonel Robert Monckton and at the successful Battle of Fort Beauséjour.
- 300 were urged "to inlist in Gov. Shirley & S Wm Pepperell's Regiments" and probably served in Shirley's disastrous Fort Oswego campaign.
- 75 were Stationed at "The Forts in The County of Hampshire in the Massachusetts Bay", probably in Maine at Fort Halifax and Fort Western on the Kennebec River.
- 3,000 Connecticut paid militia went "into the Service" under Major-General William Johnson for the expedition to take Fort Saint-Frédéric (later Fort Crown Point) by way of Lake George.
- 300 were in service to General Johnson for the expedition to Lake George on "the Pay & Sustenance" of New York.

William Johnson's expedition to take Fort Saint-Frédéric on "Pointe à la Chevelure" (called by the British Crown Point), took place in 1755. Phineas Lyman of Suffield, Connecticut was appointed major-general, and second-in-command. The Province of Connecticut initially sent 1,000 men in June in two regiments in the pay of Connecticut and one in the pay of New York Colony to General Johnson for the Crown Point expedition. The expedition never made it to Crown Point, but were surprised by the French at the Battle of Lake George.

- First Connecticut Regiment, under Major-General Lyman.
- Second Connecticut Regiment, under Colonel Elizur Goodrich, Senior.
- New York Regiment, under Connecticut Major Eliezer Fitch of Windham.

In August 1755, an additional 500 men in the pay of Connecticut were mobilized. However these arrived too late to participate in the Battle of Lake George. They were added as additional companies to the First and Second Regiments. Connecticut now had 1,800 provincial soldiers in the Crown Point expedition. In late August 1755 two new regiments of 750 men each in the pay of Connecticut were newly authorized and mobilized. This brought the total of Connecticut militia serving in the first Crown Point expedition to 3,300.

- Third Connecticut Regiment, under Colonel Eliphalet Dyer.
- Fourth Connecticut Regiment, under Colonel Elihu Chauncey.

For the 1756 expedition against Crown Point, the province voted 2,500 troops. Phineas Lyman was again appointed major-general, and second-in-command:

- First Connecticut Regiment, under Major-General Lyman.
- Second Connecticut Regiment, under Colonel David Wooster.
- Third Connecticut Regiment, under Colonel Nathan Whiting.
- Fourth Connecticut Regiment, under Colonel Andrew Ward, Junior.

Connecticut voted 1,400 provincial soldiers for the campaign season of 1757. After the alarm created by the fall of Fort William Henry the province mobilized five thousand men of the organized militia and sent them north as a temporary reinforcement against a feared French invasion:

- Col. Lyman's Regiment, under Colonel Phineas Lyman.

As a response to Prime Minister Pitt's call for troops, the General Court of Connecticut voted to raise five thousand provincial troops in four regiments, for the campaign season of 1758. They came to participate in the disastrous expedition against Fort Carillon. Phineas Lyman appointed major-general:

- First Connecticut Regiment, under Major-General Lyman.
- Second Connecticut Regiment, Colonel Nathan Whiting.
- Third Connecticut Regiment, under Colonel Eleazar Fitch.
- Fourth Connecticut Regiment, under Colonel David Wooster.

For the campaign season of 1759, the province voted 5,000 soldiers in four regiments. Phineas Lyman appointed major-general. The troops participated in the Ticonderoga expedition:

- First Connecticut Regiment, under Major-General Phineas Lyman.
- Second Connecticut Regiment, under Colonel Nathan Whiting.
- Third Connecticut Regiment, under Colonel David Wooster.
- Fourth Connecticut Regiment, under Colonel Eleazar Fitch.

The province voted five thousand men in four regiments for the campaign season 1760. Phineas Lyman appointed major-general. The troops participated in the British attack on Montreal:

- First Connecticut Regiment, under Major-General Phineas Lyman.
- Second Connecticut Regiment, under Colonel Nathan Whiting.
- Third Connecticut Regiment, under Colonel David Wooster.
- Fourth Connecticut Regiment, under Colonel Eleazar Fitch.

For the campaign season 1761 Connecticut voted 2,300 officers and men in two regiments; of these 2,000 were actually raised. Phineas Lyman appointed major-general:

- First Connecticut Regiment, under Major-General Phineas Lyman.
- Second Connecticut Regiment, under Colonel Nathan Whiting.

Two companies were raised for service during the winter of 1761/1762:

- Capt. Fitch's Independent Company, under Captain Azel Fitch.
- Capt. Ledlie's Independent Company, under Captain Hugh Ledlie.

For 1762, the province also voted 2,300 officers and men in two regiments. Phineas Lyman appointed major-general:

- First Connecticut Regiment, under Major-General Phineas Lyman.
- Second Connecticut Regiment, under Colonel Nathan Whiting

Two companies were raised for service during the winter of 1762/1763:

- Capt. Pearce's Independent Company, under Captain Thomas Pearce.
- Capt. Hait's Independent Company, under Captain Joseph Hait.

The General Assembly voted in 1764, to raise 265 men for participating in the campaign against Pontiac:

- Lieut.-Colonel Putnam's Battalion, under Lieutenant-Colonel Israel Putnam.

=== Delaware ===
It was not until 1755 that the Lower Counties on Delaware enacted a militia law. They supported the Braddock Expedition with provisions, but not with any troops. In 1758 the province raised 300 men for service as provincial soldiers:

- The Lower County Provincials, French Battell, captain.

The following year the General Assembly decided to raise 106 men to serve in the southern colonies. In 1760 the province appropriated a sum of money to the governor for warlike purposes, but did not raise any soldiers.

=== Georgia ===
At the beginning of the hostilities, the Province of Georgia had a population of less than seven thousand free inhabitants, and an organized militia of 750 men in eight companies. Governor John Reynolds argued that the province could only be defended with the help of fortified places. Two hundred rangers were needed to hold the line of communications open. In addition regular troops in peacetime, supported by militia and friendly Indians in wartime, were needed to hold the required forts. This plan was rejected by the Board of Trade, and nothing came out of it. Yet, Governor Reynolds organized a company of 40 rangers under Captain John Milledge. The rangers were supplemented by a mounted troop of volunteer militia, the First Troop of Horse Militia, consisting of men of substance who could equip and mount the troop at their own expense. Reynolds successor, Henry Ellis raised another ranger company under William Francis, but lack of appropriations forced him to pay the rangers out of his own pocket.

=== Maryland ===
The Province of Maryland built Fort Cumberland in 1754 and a ranger company protected its borders at the beginning of the war. That company participated in the Braddock Expedition, and its place as frontier guards were taken by paid volunteers from the militia:

- Maryland Ranger Company, under Captain John Dagworthy.

After Braddock's defeat in July 1755, the militia was mobilized but relieved in October by paid volunteers. In the spring of 1756 the General Assembly appropriated moneys for erecting Fort Frederick and several frontier blockhouses, and to raise a provincial force of 200 men to garrison these fortifications. In the fall of 1756 they appropriated more moneys for raising and maintaining 300 men for the Royal American Regiment, and another 100 men for a company to be incorporated in Dagworthy's battalion; one third of the battalion to be on constant duty at the frontier as rangers. In the spring of 1757 the Assembly introduced tax credits for those who enlisted in provincial service, and hired a band of Cherokees for frontier service. Three militia companies were also mobilized and sent to Fort Frederick as garrison. Maryland participated in the Forbes Expedition 1758 with the frontier force under Colonel Dagworthy, about 500 men. To replace them the militia of the western counties were mobilized, and marched under Governor Sharpe to take control of Fort Cumberland, when the Virginia Regiment under George Washington left it. Maryland raised the following provincial units annually from 1755 to the end of the war:

- Maryland Garrison Battalion, under Lieutenant-Colonel John Dagworthy.
- Cresap's Rangers, under Captain Thomas Cresap.

=== Massachusetts ===
In 1754 Massachusetts Bay voted 800 provincial soldiers under John Winslow, who built Fort Halifax and Fort Western on the Kennebec River.

In 1755, the province first voted 1,200 provincial soldiers for William Johnson's Crown Point expedition against Fort Saint-Frédéric, who participated in the Battle of Lake George. Then another 2,000 to serve for two months, but a full year if necessary, for the Bay of Fundy Campaign, under John Winslow.

The soldiers from Johnson's expedition returned in the fall of 1755, except 600 men posted at Fort William Henry and Fort Edward over the winter. In 1756 the General Court voted 3,000 men to dislodge the French from Crown Point, and the commander-in-chief, governor William Shirley appointed John Winslow to command the force. The capture of Fort Oswego, and the bad feelings between the new British commander-in-chief, Lord Loudon, and the provincial officers, led to the ultimate failure of this expedition without any serious fighting. The following Massachusetts regiments were raised in 1756:

- Colonel Jonathan Bagley's Massachusetts Regiment
- Colonel Joseph Dwight's Massachusetts Regiment
- Colonel Richard Gridley's Massachusetts Regiment
- Colonel Ichabod Plaisted's Massachusetts Regiment
- Colonel Timothy Ruggles' Massachusetts Regiment
- Colonel Joseph Thatcher's Massachusetts Regiment

Lord Loudon's attitudes toward the provincial soldiers, seeing them as subordinate auxiliaries instead of brothers-in-arms, created political dissent in Massachusetts, and the General Court voted only 1,800 soldiers for the campaign season of 1757. The Massachusetts provincials served at Fort William Henry and Fort Edward, under British superior officers, fed by the British commissary, and subject to the Articles of War. About 800 Massachusetts provincials were part of the garrison of Fort William Henry and suffered the siege and massacre in the summer of 1757.

When William Pitt became prime minister in 1757, the attitudes toward the war made a remarkable change in the colonies, and in 1758, the Massachusetts General Court voted to raise 7,000 provincial soldiers to serve until November unless released earlier. The Massachusetts provincials participated in Abercrombie's expedition against Ticonderoga. The failed attack on Fort Carillon stalled further advances, and the provincials spent the rest of the summer at Lake George, building Fort George as a replacement for William Henry.

The good feelings continued in the colonies, and for the campaign season 1759 Massachusetts voted 7,000 and Connecticut 5,000 soldiers. The Massachusetts troops were used to garrison Louisbourg and other Atlantic forts; freeing regular soldiers for field operations. But the provincials also participated in Wolfe's expedition against Quebec, and Amherst's against Ticonderoga and Crown Point.

The fall of Quebec did not lessen the zeal of Massachusetts, and the province voted 5,000 men for 1760, and reenlisted as many as possible of the provincial garrison troops in the Atlantic forts. The Massachusetts soldiers in the field belonged mainly to Haviland's expedition over Lake Champlain to Montreal. The following year 3,000 Massachusetts provincials saw service, mainly as garrison troops. In 1762 3,220 garrison troops were voted, but 2,637 actually raised. A Massachusetts regiment fought at the Battle of Signal Hill.

=== New Hampshire ===
As a response to the attack and abduction of a family of settlers by hostile Indians in 1754, the province of New Hampshire hastily raised a company of provincial soldiers pursuing the perpetrators, but to no avail. Under royal command the province also garrisoned the provincial forts in the Connecticut River valley from the summer of 1754, to the spring of 1755, when the Crown took control of them. Further depredations by hostiles in 1754, was met with mobilization of detachments from the companies and regiments of the organized militia. Temporary ranger companies were also raised for short-term emergencies.

In 1755, New Hampshire voted 600 provincial soldiers for William Johnson's expedition against Fort Saint-Frédéric, who participated in the Battle of Lake George. After that battle, another regiment of 300 men were raised by the province. In the fall, a ranger company was raised for two months, protecting the frontier. Another company was later the same year raised, as New Hampshire's quota for garrisoning forts Edward and William Henry over the winter:

- New Hampshire Provincial Regiment, under Colonel Joseph Blanchard of Dunstable, New Hampshire.
- Second New Hampshire Regiment, under Colonel Peter Gilman of Exeter, New Hampshire.
- Ranger Company, under Captain James Neall.
- Garrison Company under Captain Robert Rogers.

In the spring of 1756, Robert Rogers was commissioned by William Shirley, as general and commander-in-chief, to raise an independent company of rangers, outside the provincial establishment; the nucleus and beginning of Rogers' Rangers. New Hampshire participated in the expedition against Crown Point with a regiment of 600 men:

- New Hampshire Provincial Regiment, under Colonel Nathaniel Meserve of Portsmouth, New Hampshire.

New Hampshire voted a regiment of 500 men for the campaign season of 1757. The Colonel, a company of carpenters, and three ranger companies served with Lord Loudon at Halifax, Nova Scotia, in the aborted expedition against Louisbourg. The rest of the regiment, forming a battalion under its lieutenant-colonel, was part of the garrison of Fort William Henry, and suffered the fate of the siege and the capitulation. After the fall of William Henry, New Hampshire voted to raise another battalion of 250 men for the defense of Fort Edward. They were stationed at the Fort at Number 4. There was also a company at Fort William and Mary:

- New Hampshire Provincial Regiment, under Colonel Nathaniel Meserve of Portsmouth, New Hampshire.
- New Hampshire Provincial Battalion, under Major Thomas Tash.
- Garrison Company at Fort William and Mary, under Captain Thomas Bell.

In 1758 New Hampshire furnished 800 men in a regiment; a portion of the regiment served in the expedition against Louisbourg under its colonel, and the remainder did duty on the western frontier under its Lieutenant-Colonel:

- New Hampshire Provincial Regiment, under Colonel John Hart of Portsmouth, New Hampshire.

For the campaign season of 1759, 1,000 men was raised through drafts from the militia regiments. They served in the expedition against Fort Niagara, later participating in the battle of Ticonderoga and the battle of Quebec:

- New Hampshire Provincial Regiment, under Colonel Zaccheus Lovewell of Dunstable, New Hampshire.

In 1760 a regiment of 800 men were voted for the conquest of Canada.

- New Hampshire Provincial Regiment, under Colonel John Goffe of Derryfield, New Hampshire.

=== New Jersey ===
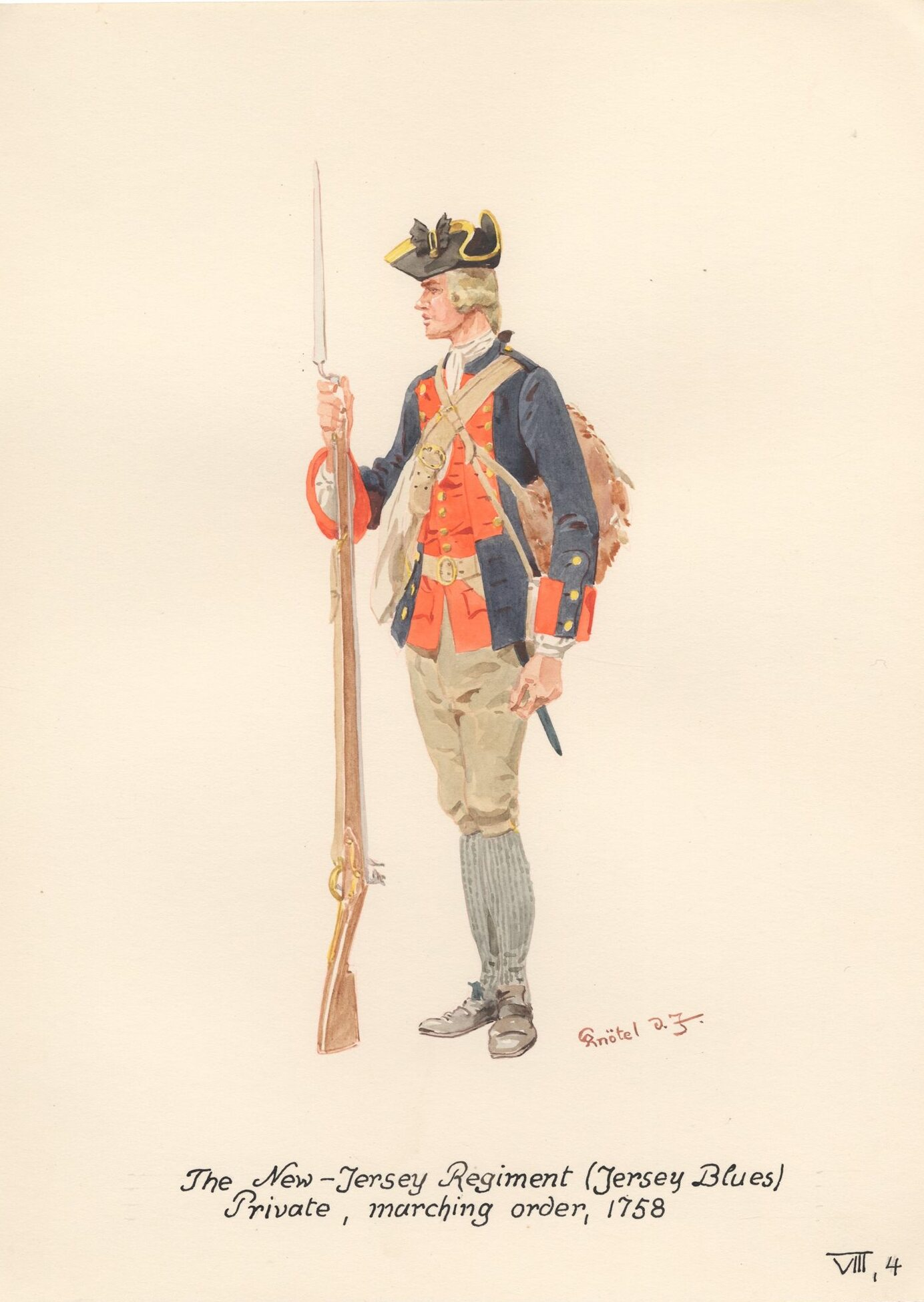
Illustration of a Jersey Blues private in marching order in 1758

The province of New Jersey voted 500 men for service during the campaign season 1755. The battalion was sent north; after reaching Albany it was divided, one detachment with William Johnson's expedition to Lake George, and one with William Shirley against Fort Niagara. After Braddock's defeat, the citizens of the province raised, on their own initiative and cost, a frontier force of 400 men, and it was not until December that the Assembly put it on the provincial establishment, at the same time withdrawing its battalion from the northern operations.

- New Jersey Provincial Battalion, under Colonel Peter Schuyler.
- New Jersey Frontier Guard, under Colonel John Anderson.

In 1756 the Assembly voted 250 men for frontier service. At the fall of Fort Oswego Colonel Schuyler and half the New Jersey Regiment were taken prisoners-of-war and taken to Canada; they were released at the end of the campaign, but under parole not to serve for 18 months. A new enlistment replaced the loss:

- New Jersey Provincial Regiment, under Colonel Schuyler; after his capture, Colonel John Parker.
- New Jersey Frontier Guards, under Colonel Jacob DeHart of Elizabeth, New Jersey.

New Jersey voted 500 men for the campaign season of 1757, but refused to use a draft to increase the force to 1,000 men. The provincial regiment was part of the garrison of Fort William Henry, and suffered the same fate as the rest of the garrison troops after the capitulation in 1757. The prisoners-of-war taken were released under parole not to serve for 18 months. A detachment of the regiment had already suffered heavily at the Sabbath Day Point massacre. The Assembly also voted 100 rangers for service over the winter 1757/1758:

- New Jersey Provincial Regiment, under Colonel John Parker.
- New Jersey Ranger Company, under Captain Gardiner and his three lieutenants John Rickey, John Stull, and John Wood.

The new vigor with which the war was fought, made the New Jersey Assembly vote 1,000 men for the campaign season of 1758; offering bounties to induce enlistment, and raising the officers' pay. This complement of a thousand men, the province tried to keep in the field during the campaign seasons 1758, 1759, and 1760; voting 600 men for each of the seasons 1761 and 1762, and actually raising 554 for 1762. Furthermore, raising a separate garrison company in 1762:

- New Jersey Provincial Regiment
- New Jersey Garrison Company

=== New York ===
In 1755 the province of New York voted to raise 800 provincial soldiers, impressed artisans for making boats, and bought weapons in Virginia, all in preparation for William Johnson's expedition against Crown Point. Connecticut supplied 300 of these men in companies of these soldiers, although on the establishment of New York; drafts from the militia would be used to fill the province's commitment. The expedition's artillery train was funded by New York and Massachusetts. After Braddock's defeat the lieutenant-governor proposed the raising of another 450 provincial soldiers, but it was rejected by the Assembly.

- New York Regiment of Foot, under Colonel William Cockcroft.

In 1756 the New York Assembly, amidst a raging controversy over the provincial civil list and the colony's debt, voted to raise 1,000 provincial soldiers for that years campaign, but withheld the final decision. The governor proposed to call out the militia if the Assembly did not give a final affirmative; eventually it did, and also voted an additional 550 soldiers, on the condition that 400 of these would be used against the Indians on the western frontier of the province. The fall of Fort Oswego led to widespread panic in the province, and the mobilization of the militia in Albany and Orange counties.

- New York Forces, under Colonel Beamsley Glazier.

In 1757 the Assembly voted to 1,000 provincial soldiers for that years campaign. During the siege of Fort William Henry, the militia of Albany, Dutchess, and Ulster counties, and parts of Orange County were eventually mobilized, but soon became mutinous. In a much different spirit than earlier in the war, the Assembly voted to raise 2,680 men for the campaign of 1758, with ten pounds bounty for every volunteer, and twenty shilling to the officer for every recruit; furthermore to maintain every poor soldier's family during his absence.

In 1759 and again in 1760, the Assembly voted to raise 2,680 men for the campaign season, under the same conditions as in 1758; although the bounty was increased to 20 pounds. In 1761 the Assembly voted to raise two-thirds of the previous levies, 1,787 men for that season. The government in London requested in 1762 a levy of 479 men for the regular army, for operations in the West Indies. The Assembly, not wanting to establish a dangerous precedent, instead voted a large sum of money in support. It again voted 1,787 men, although with the proviso that they would not serve outside the continent, and actually raised 1,547 men.

- New York Regiment, Colonel John Johnston 1759.
- First New York Regiment, Colonel Bartholomew Le Roux 1760; Colonel Michael Thodey 1761.
- Second New York Regiment, Colonel Isaac Corsa 1760; Colonel George Brewerton 1761.
- Third New York Regiment, Colonel Nathaniel Woodhull 1760.

=== North Carolina ===
At the outbreak of hostilities with France in 1754, the organized militia of the province of North Carolina had fallen into decay, and was hardly any more than a paper organization; many of the officer billets were unfilled, and about half of the men lacked arms. The Crown supplied one thousand stand of arms. They were issued to the western militia and to the provincial troops now raised. The Assembly had decided to organize a force of 750 men for service against the French at Fort Duquesne, but not having taken into account that the province had to provision the force outside its borders, the strength had to be lowered to 450 in order to afford the required victuals. Funds were still not sufficient, and the North Carolina troops had just reached Winchester, Virginia when they were disbanded:

- North Carolina Regiment, under Colonel James Innes.

North Carolina participated with a ranger company of one hundred men under Captain Dobbs in Braddock's expedition against Fort Duquesne 1755; it avoided annihilation As it was attached to Dunbar's brigade, far from the action. The province also raised a company of 50 men for the protection of the frontier:

- North Carolina Provincial Company, under Captain Brice Dobbs, the son of governor Arthur Dobbs.
- Frontier Company, under Captain Hugh Waddell.

The Assembly responded to Braddock's defeat by levying three more companies, and ordered Dobbs' company to New York, to join with the three other companies in forming a battalion. After the fall of Fort Oswego 1756, the battalion was disbanded and most of the soldiers enlisted in the 60th Regiment of Foot:

- North Carolina Battalion, under Major Brice Dobbs.

Governor Dobbs had promised the other southern colonies that North Carolina would raise 400 provincial soldiers for 1757, but the Assembly voted to raise only 200 men, specifically for service in South Carolina under Colonel Bouquet. The governor ordered the militia in the southern border counties to be prepared to join Bouquets army, but they refused to leave the colony.

Two companies of 50 men each were formed for service on the western frontier of the colony. One, under Hugh Waddell garrisoned Fort Dobbs. The other, under Captain Bailey was sent to build a fort for the Catawba Indians. When the fort for the Catawba was abandoned, Bailey's Company was sent to Fort Dobbs:

- Company under Major Hugh Waddell.
- Company under Captain Andrew Bailey.

For 1758 the Assembly voted 450 provincial soldiers. The battalion was to join in the Forbes Expedition in Pennsylvania. Two garrison companies were also raised; one for Fort Johnston, and one for Fort Granville at Ocracoke:

- North Carolina Battalion, under Major Hugh Waddell.
- Garrison Company at Fort Johnston, under Captain James Moore.
- Garrison Company at Fort Granville, under Captain Charles McNair.

A long and tedious power struggle between the governor and the Assembly had as a consequence that no provincial troops were raised by North Carolina until late 1759, in spite of the start of the Anglo-Cherokee War. Two 30-man companies were raised to serve at Fort Dobbs on the western frontier late in the year:

- 30-man company under Major Hugh Waddell
- 30-man company under Capt Andrew Bailey

In early February, 1760, NC reduced the Fort Dobbs garrison to just 1 Captain, 1 Lieutenant, 1 Ensign, 2 Drummers, and 26 Privates. Now a colonel, Hugh Waddell remained at the fort as well. Fort Dobbs was attacked by a party of Cherokee on February 27, 1760.

- 30-man company under Colonel Waddell and Captain Bailey.

In 1761, North Carolina agreed to raise a regiment of 500 men organized into 5 companies for 7 months service. Colonel Waddell commanded the regiment, which took quite a bit of time to raise and equip. By July the regiment began marching to southwestern Virginia to rendezvous with a 750 strong Virginia regiment. Together they were to support a British Invasion of the Lower and Middle Cherokee towns by attaching the Overhill settlements. The force only made it as far as modern Kingsport, Tennessee before peace was concluded. The North Carolina Provincial Regiment was disbanded by December, 1761:

- North Carina Provincial Regiment under Colonel Hugh Waddell.

=== Pennsylvania ===
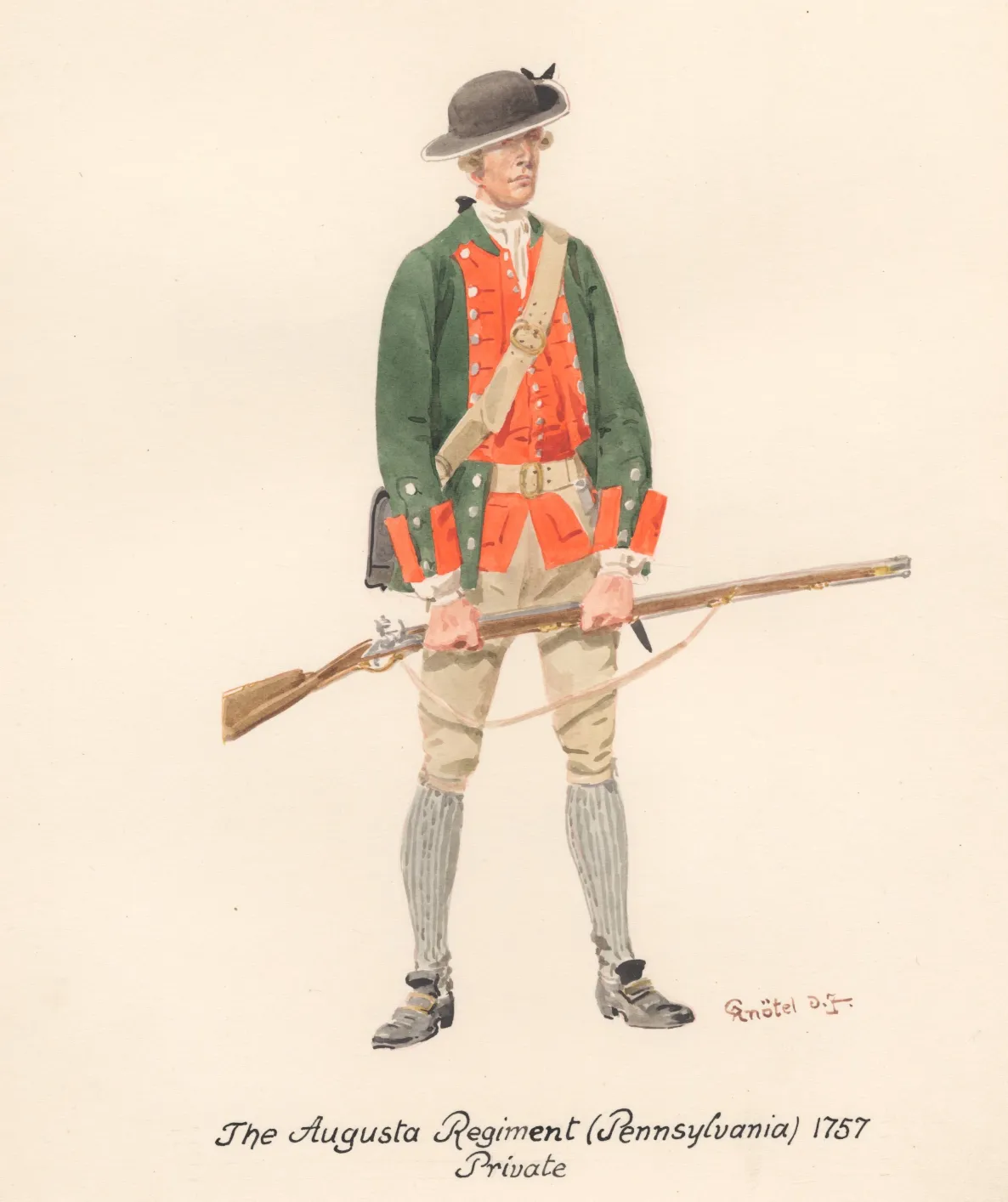
Illustration of an Augusta Regiment private in 1757

At the outbreak of hostilities, the Province of Pennsylvania lacked proper militia laws, as the General Assembly long had been dominated by pacifist Quakers. Instead a voluntary association whose members armed and equipped themselves, the Associated Companies, founded by Benjamin Franklin acted as a substitute militia. The Associators were regulated by law in 1755, when the election of officers were prescribed. The act specifically proclaimed that it could not be in any way construed to affect the rights of those who had conscientious objections against bearing arms. It also specified that no member of the Association was obliged to march more than three days from the settled country, or lay in garrison more than three weeks.

The pacifist nature of the Assembly did not prevent Pennsylvania from raising provincial troops. The Deputy Governor and the Provincial Commissioners (a board of war and Indian affairs) organized a provincial force of 25 companies and 1,400 men in the province's pay. Armstrong's battalion being the force of the Kittanning Expedition 1756.

- First Battalion, Pennsylvania Regiment, under Lieutenant Colonel Conrad Weiser.
- Second Battalion, Pennsylvania Regiment, under Lieutenant Colonel John Armstrong.
- Augusta Regiment or Third Battalion at Fort Augusta, under Lieutenant Colonel William Clapham.

In 1756 the Assembly found it necessary to regulate the provincial forces by law, putting them under the British Articles of War, and authorizing the creation of courts-martial. The following year a new militia law was enacted, making militia service compulsory for all but conscientious objectors. Catholics were obliged to serve, but were not allowed to vote for, or be elected, officers.

In 1757 the Assembly allowed bounties for the recruitment of 200 extra provincial soldiers, to be sent to South Carolina. After the fall of Fort William Henry, the Assembly also authorized the Deputy Governor to raise 1,000 soldiers, or draw them from the frontier garrisons, for the impending operations against the French in the Lake Champlain area. If the garrisons were used, their place should be filled by locally recruited garrison and ranger companies. In 1758 the Assembly approved the raising of 700 soldiers, soon raised to 1,000, of which 700 would be serving with the British forces operating against the French, and 300 be kept in the province. A provincial frigate was also commissioned for the defense of the Delaware Bay. Encouraged by the new prime minister, William Pitt, the Assembly resolved to put 2,700 men under British command for the Forbes Expedition of 1758, including the 1,000 provincial soldiers already serving.

- Provincial ship Pennsylvania, Captain John Sibbald.
- Pennsylvania Regiment, Deputy Governor William Denny, colonel.
- Pennsylvania Regiment, Conrad Weiser, lieutenant colonel.
- Pennsylvania Regiment, James Burd, major.
- Pennsylvania Regiment, Hugh Mercer, major.

After the fall of Fort Duquesne, the Pennsylvania provincial force specifically raised for Forbes' expedition was disbanded, but the old troops remained in service. The Assembly voted to raise 1,300 soldiers for the campaign season 1759. Encouraged by the British victories in Canada the Assembly in 1760 at first reduced the number of provincial soldiers to 150, but when the Crown insisted that the province should do its part, it agreed on raising 2,700 men again. After the final fall of Canada to the British in 1760, the Pennsylvania forces were reduced to 150 soldiers that had to be kept beyond their enlistment period. The Assembly refused to pay them, but conceded to raise a garrison of 30 men for Fort Augusta. For 1761 the Crown requested 2/3 of the men levied in 1760, but the Assembly refused to oblige, and agreed only to raise 900 soldiers on a promise that they would remain in the province. The Assembly voted 1,000 soldiers for 1762, but refused to furnish recruits for the regular army.

- Pennsylvania Regiment, Deputy Governor William Denny, colonel.
- Pennsylvania Regiment, First Battalion, John Armstrong, Colonel Commandant.
- Pennsylvania Regiment, Second Battalion, James Burd, colonel commandant.
- Pennsylvania Regiment, Third Battalion, Hugh Mercer, colonel commandant.
- The New Levies (1759), William Clapham, colonel.

=== Rhode Island ===
Early in 1755, the province of Rhode Island and Providence Plantations recruited 113 men, but they were not intended for provincial service, but as recruits for Shirley's and Pepperrell's regiments-regular British army regiments raised in North America under special terms of enlistment. But when Governor Shilrey of Massachusetts requested soldiers for William Johnson's expedition to Crown Point, the General Assembly repealed the enlistment of the 113 men, and voted to raise 400 men in four companies, for the expedition. The men could be recruited from other colonies or from the Iroquois, if necessary. Four companies of the regiment participated in the battle of Lake George, distinguishing themselves at the "Bloody Morning Scout." Before the war, the province had had only had a few soldiers in its pay, manning Fort George on Goat Island in Narragansett Bay. Now the Assembly ordered its commandant to enlist 50 more men for the garrison. After Braddock's defeat, another three companies, of 50 men each, were levied and augmented with deserters from the original regiment. Later four additional companies, of 50 men each, were raised:

- Rhode Island Regiment, Christopher Harris, colonel.

Over the winter 1755/56 Rhode Island retained only 185 men in military service, one hundred at home, and the rest at Fort William Henry. A regiment of 500 men, divided into ten companies, were voted for 1756; recruited by impressment if necessary. Later the same year a hundred additional men, in two companies, were voted. Rumors of a French advance against the fort encouraged the Assembly to vote another 400 men; this time by draft if necessary, from every man between 16 and 60 years of age, with some exceptions. The governor was made colonel of the new regiment, but Lord Loudoun countermanded its marching orders as the season was too late, and the soldiers were discharged:

- Rhode Island Regiment, Christopher Harris, colonel.
- Second Rhode Island Regiment ("The 400 men"), Governor Stephen Hopkins, colonel.

In February 1757, the General Assembly voted to raise a regiment of 450 men, in five companies, to serve for a year. Later the Assembly, on Lord Loudon's request, voted another 150 men, to be ready to serve if required by the commandant of Fort Edward. Some of the Rhode Island soldiers were stationed at Fort Edward, others under the colonel at Fort William Henry. After the fall of Fort William Henry, the Assembly ordered a new regiment to be formed, by drafting one-sixth of the militia. But the French withdrew to Canada, and the army in the field was put on winter establishment. Most soldiers were discharged; a company of 100 rangers retained for winter service, and 250 men reenlisted to serve as a readiness force in the province:

- Rhode Island Regiment, Samuel Angel, colonel.
- Second Rhode Island Regiment John Andrews, colonel.
- Ranger Company
- "Readiness Battalion"

In 1758, the Rhode Island Assembly voted to raise a regiment of 1,000 men for the campaign season. Old officers were retained, but billets made empty by death, sickness or resignation were filled, commissions being conditioned on fulfilling recruitment quotas. The Rhode Island Regiment participated in the disastrous expedition against Ticonderoga, all but two companies participating in the battle. Frequent desertions plagued this and other regiments during that campaign. A detachment from the regiment took part in the capture of Fort Frontenac:

- Rhode Island Regiment, Godfrey Malbone, colonel; Henry Babcock, colonel.

In December 1758, upon the request of General Amherst, the Assembly decided to retain the troops over winter 1758/59, to be ready early in the spring. In February 1759, it voted to furnish 1,000 men in 13 companies for the campaign season, the number of seamen joining Royal Navy service, to be deducted from the one thousand:

- Rhode Island Regiment, Henry Babcock, colonel.

Early in 1760, the Assembly voted to raise a regiment of 1,000 men for the campaign. After the victory in Canada, the Assembly voted to disband the regiment, fifteen days after its discharge, many men already having "discharged" themselves after the fall of Montreal:

- Rhode Island Regiment, Christopher Harris, colonel.

The Assembly voted to raise 666 men in seven companies for 1761; 395 of these were actually raised. General Amherst requested that a company of 64 men be kept over the winter 1761/62, which the Assembly approved; it formed part of the garrison of Fort Stanwix:

- Rhode Island Regiment, John Whiting, colonel.

In 1762 the Assembly voted to raise a provincial regiment of 666 men, and also an additional 178 recruits for the regular British Army, as requested by General Amherst. Three companies of the regiment participated in the British attack on Cuba, losing about half of its strength through sickness. The rest of the regiment was stationed at Albany, New York:

- Rhode Island Regiment, Samuel Rose, colonel.
- "Cuba Detachment", Christopher Hargil, lieutenant colonel.

=== South Carolina ===
The province of South Carolina did not raise one single soldier for the fight against the French. It was first with the outbreak of the Cherokee War that any provincial forces were organized. Provincial troops from South Carolina participated in the construction of Fort Loudon. In 1759 the province mounted an expedition against the Cherokee homeland, but it did not get farther than to Fort Prince George. In the spring of 1760 the Royal Scots and Montgomerie's Highlanders arrived to South Carolina for an offensive against the Cherokees. They were supported by seven troops of mounted rangers raised by Lieutenant Governor Bull. In spite of the success of the offensive, Fort Loudon had to capitulate. South Carolina now raised a provincial regiment for a renewed offensive with the Royal Scots that reached the heart of the Cherokee homeland, and resulted in a peace treaty in 1761. Attempts were made to raise an additional regiment in 1760, but not enough men could be recruited.

- South Carolina Mounted Rangers
- South Carolina Regiment, Colonel Probart Howarth (also a lieutenant in one of the independent companies of the British Army stationed in South Carolina) 1758.
- South Carolina Regiment, Colonel Thomas Middleton 1760.
- Additional South Carolina Regiment, Colonel Richard Richardson.

=== Virginia ===
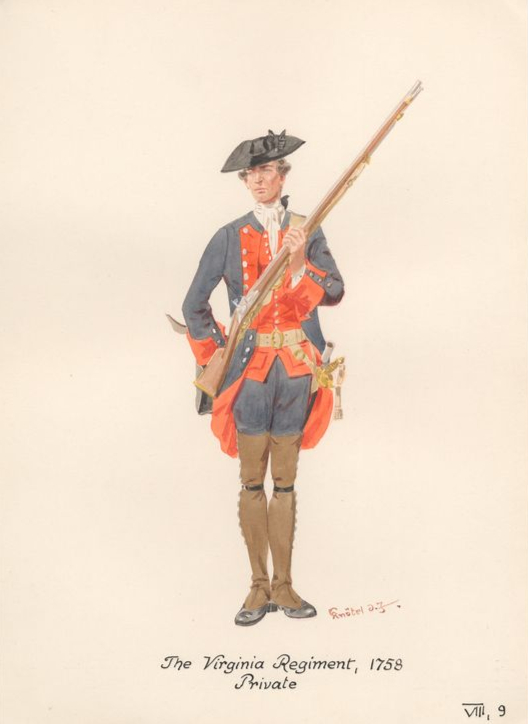
Illustration of a Virginia Regiment private in 1758

The conflict over the Ohio Country led to raising of the first provincial regiment in Virginia. In 1754 the General Assembly voted to raise a regiment of 300 men and send it to the confluence of the Alleghany and Monongahela rivers.

- Virginia Regiment, Colonel Joshua Fry; Colonel George Washington.
  - Lieutenant Colonel George Muse
  - Major Adam Stephen
  - Captain Robert Stobo
  - Captain Peter Hog
  - Captain Andrew Lewis
  - Captain Jacob van Braam
  - Captain Thomas Waggoner
  - Captain George Mercer
  - Captain William Polson

After the battle of Fort Necessity the Assembly voted to raise the regiment from five to ten companies.

The Virginia provincial troops that participated in the Braddock Expedition of 1755, and suffered defeat at the Battle of the Monongahela were unregimented; at the behest of General Braddock they were organized in two companies of carpenters, six companies of rangers, and one troop of mounted rangers, in all 450 men. The remaining 350 from the original ten companies of the Virginia Regiment were used to augment the two regular regiments of the expedition.

After Braddock's defeat, the Virginia regiment was immediately reformed, and the Assembly voted in 1755 to raise it to 1,500 men in 16 companies. In 1756 its actual strength was 1,400 men, while in 1757 it was reduced to 1,000 men.

- Virginia Regiment, Colonel George Washington.

In 1758 Virginia raised two regiments of a thousand men each for the Forbes Expedition. The enlistment period for the first regiment expired in May 1759, and for the second in December 1758:

- First Virginia Regiment, Colonel George Washington.
- Second Virginia Regiment, Colonel William Byrd III.

After the fall of Fort Duquesne, the Assembly voted in 1759 to fill up the one regiment still in service, and to raise a force of another 500 men that would remain in the province for its immediate defense. The regiment would remain in service until May 1760:

- Virginia Regiment, Colonel William Byrd III.
- Additional force of 500 men.

With the outbreak of the Cherokee War, the Assembly prolonged the Regiments service, adding 300 men in three companies as frontier guards. It remained on the Cherokee frontier until early 1762, when the governor disbanded it:

- Virginia Regiment, Colonel William Byrd III; Lieutenant Colonel Adam Stephen.

In 1762 the British government wanted Virginia to raise a regiment that would be put on the regular British establishment, but the General Assembly voted to re-raise the Virginia Regiment. That regiment was disbanded in May 1763, just before the outbreak of Pontiac's War, since the province could not maintain it without the paper money disallowed by the Board of Trade.

- Virginia Regiment, Colonel Adam Stephen.

== Successors ==
Both the state regiments outside the Continental Army, and the loyalist regiments, often called provincials attached to the British Army, of the American Revolutionary War can be seen as successors to the provincial troops of the French and Indian Wars era.
