= Enoch Hale =

Colonel Enoch Hale (1733–1813) was born in Rowley, Province of Massachusetts Bay, on November 28, 1733. He and his brother Nathan (who was not the like-named Nathan Hale, famous spy of the American Revolution) lived as children in Hampstead, Province of New Hampshire, before moving to Rindge as young men and rising to prominence in the area.

== Biography ==
Enoch Hale was a man of large possessions and very prominent in civil and military affairs, particularly during his residence in Rindge, Jaffrey and Walpole, New Hampshire. He became an extensive landowner shortly after settling in Rindge, and dealt largely in lands. He was the first justice of the peace of Rindge in 1768. Was Selectman of Rindge 1772, 73, 74,75 and 83 and was present and officiated at such town meetings in 1784; was a member of the New Hampshire Assembly in 1776 and 1778 representing Rindge, Jaffrey and Peterboro Slip (now Sharon); was delegate to the Provincial Congress at Exeter in 1775; high sheriff of Cheshire, 1778 to 1783; a member of the State Council, 1780 to 1783; senator from Cheshire County, 1784. In 1776 he was appointed colonel of a "geographical regiment" of the New Hampshire militia, and held that position during the war, having charge of all the raising, mustering and paying of troops within his district. In 1778 he raised a regiment to reinforce General Sullivan, then operating in Rhode Island in conjunction with the French Fleet, and marched in command of it to Rhode Island. The records of the New Hampshire Committee of Safety abound in references to him.(7th vol. Trans. N.H. Hist. Soc.) Before this he had served in the old French war, and was under Col. Monroe at Fort Wm. Henry at the massacre in 1758. Was a private in Captain Bayley's company, Col. Meserve's regiment, in the expedition to Crown Point March to November, 1757, and again in Capt. Hasen's company, Col. Hart's regiment, April to October, 1758.

He was an original member of the Congregational Church in Rindge at its organization in 1765, served frequently on ecclesiastical committees, and was active in the settlement of Rev. Dr. Seth Payson as pastor in 1781.

In 1785, after his removal to Walpole, he built, under an act of the Legislature of New Hampshire authorizing it, the first bridge across the Connecticut River at Bellows Falls, which remained the only bridge across the river until 1796. The Vilas Bridge is now in this location. After his removal to Grafton, Vermont, he represented that town in the Legislature of Vermont for two years when about 75 years of age. Wherever he lived, his vigorous intellect and energy of character impressed themselves on all about him and made him always a leader.

=== Sheriff of Cheshire County ===
"While Sheriff of Cheshire county in 1781 the controversy between the State of New Hampshire and the towns the known as the "New Hampshire grants" now Vermont, was at its height, the new State also claimed jurisdiction of several towns east of Connecticut River and within the county of Cheshire. In performance of his duty as sheriff, Col. Hale undertook to release certain prisoners held in jail in Charlestown, under the so-called Vermont authorities, for alleged resistance to the Vermont officials, but was himself arrested, refusing to give bail or in any way recognize the authority of Vermont officials, was committed to his own jail at Charlestown, under the charge of Dr. William Page of Charlestown, who claimed to act as sheriff of the county of Washington, Vt. Dr. Page was grandfather of Gov. John B. Page of Rutland and Dr. George Page of Crown Point. Troops were ordered out on both sides and the condition of affairs looked serious. Dr. Page was in turn arrested at Exeter by order of the New Hampshire Legislature, and confined in jail there. Hale was released on 30 Dec., 1781, and Page on 10 Jan., 1782, and the whole matter was finally settled in 1782 on the basis proposed by the Federal Congress, The Vermont Legislature withdrawing all claim of jurisdiction of the towns east of the Connecticut river."

=== Battles ===
During the French and Indian War Enoch Hale served in the New Hampshire Provincial Regiment in 1755 and 1757-1758. Enoch Hale was the 1st magistrate in the town of Rindge. During the American Revolutionary War Colonel Enoch Hale led the 15th New Hampshire Militia Regiment at the Battle of Bennington and Battle of Rhode Island in 1778.

== Genealogy ==
Enoch Hale was not the son of Moses Hale (Thomas3, Thomas2, Thomas1) is said to be born in Rowley 28 Nov. 1733. Enoch was one of 7 children; Nathan who died young, Moses, Elizabeth, Eunice,

Lucy and another Nathan. According to Descendants of Thomas Hale P. 94 indicates Moses family. Moses father was Justice Thomas Hale of Newbury, grandson of Thomas Hale, Watton-at-Stone, Hertfordshire, England who arrived in 1637 and was founder of Newbury, Ma.

Colonel Enoch Hale died April 9, 1813, in Grafton, Vermont.

== See also ==
- New Hampshire historical marker no. 61: First Connecticut River Bridge

== Sources ==
- Derby, Samuel Carroll (1901). Early Dublin: A List of the Revolutionary Soldiers of Dublin, N.H. Columbus, Ohio: Press of Spahr & Glenn.
- The Connecticut River Valley in southern Vermont and New Hampshire: historical sketches. Rutland, Vt.: Tuttle Co. Marble City Press. 1929.
- State Builders: An Illustrated Historical and Biographical Record of the State of New Hampshire. State Builders Publishing Manchester, NH 1903
