= Nathan Whiting =

American soldier and merchant

Member of the Connecticut General Assembly
- In office c. 1763 – 9 April 1771

Personal details
- Born: 4 May 1724 Windham, Connecticut, Great Britain
- Died: 9 April 1771 (aged 46)
- Resting place: New Haven, Connecticut, United States
- Children: 8
- Education: Yale University

Military service
- Allegiance: Great Britain
- Years of service: 1745-1757
- Battles/wars: War of the Austrian Succession 1st Siege of Louisbourg 7 Years War Battle of Lake George

Nathan Whiting (4 May 1724 – 9 April 1771) was a soldier and merchant in Colonial America.

== Biography ==
Whiting's parents died while he was a child, and he was raised by father's sister Mary and her husband, Reverend Thomas Clap. Whiting graduated from Yale in 1743 while his uncle Thomas was president of the university.

In 1745, Ensign Nathan Whiting joined the New England army being raised to capture Fort Louisbourg from the French. After his service in King George's War, he became a merchant in New Haven. In 1750, Nathan married Mary Saltonstall. They would have eight children together.

At the start of the 7 Years War, Whiting was appointed as Lieutenant Colonel of the 2nd Connecticut Provincial Regiment. During the Battle of Lake George on September 8, 1755, the 2nd Regiment and the Massachusetts regiment of Col. Ephraim Williams were marching between Lake George and Fort Edward 14 miles away, when their column was ambushed by an army of French and their native allies. With the death of Col. Williams, Col. Whiting led the survivors back to Sir William Johnson's camp at Lake George. There, the British army held off the French attacks until men from Joseph Blanchard's New Hampshire Provincial Regiment attacked the rear of the French army and captured the French commander Jean Erdman, Baron Dieskau.

In 1756, Whiting was promoted to full Colonel in the Connecticut militia. In 1757, his provincial regiment was at Fort at Number 4 on the Connecticut River in New Hampshire guarding the frontier. After the war, Whiting served in the Connecticut General Assembly until his death on 9 April 1771. He is buried at the Grove Street Cemetery, New Haven.
