= Jonathan Blanchard =

Jonathan Blanchard may refer to:

- Jonathan Blanchard (abolitionist) (1811–1892), American educator, first president of Wheaton College, Illinois
- Jonathan Blanchard (statesman) (1738–1788), American statesman, Continental Congressman for New Hampshire
