= Battle of the Monongahela order of battle =

1755 battle in present-day Pennsylvania, US

Order of battle at the Battle of the Monongahela lists the opposing forces engaged in the Battle of the Monongahela July 9, 1755.

== British Crown ==
- Major-general Edward Braddock (commander-in-chief) DOW
  - Colonel George Washington, formerly of the Virginia Regiment (volunteer aide)
  - Captain Robert Orme, Coldstream Guards (aide) WIA
  - Captain Roger Morris, 48th Foot (aide) WIA
  - Captain William Shirley (secretary) KIA
  - Captain Francis Halkett, 44th Foot (brigade major)
- Lieutenant-colonel Sir John St. Clair, 22nd Foot (deputy quartermaster-general) WIA
  - Lieutenant Mathew Leslie, 44th Foot (deputy quartermaster) WIA
- Captain Christopher Gist, formerly of the Virginia Regiment (guide)

=== British Army ===
- 44th Regiment of Foot, Colonel Sir Peter Halkett (commanding officer) KIA; Ensign Daniel Disney (adjutant) WIA
- 48th Regiment of Foot, Lieutenant-colonel Ralph Burton (commanding officer) WIA; Lieutenant John Gordon (adjutant)
- 3rd Independent New York Company, Captain John Rutherford (commanding)
- 4th Independent New York Company, Captain Horatio Gates (commanding) WIA
- 3rd Independent South Carolina Company, Captain Paul Demere (commanding)

=== Board of Ordnance ===
- Train of Royal Artillery (some 60 officers and men, six 12 pounders, six 6 pounders, 4 howitzers and around 30 coehorn mortars) commanded by Captain Orde

=== Royal Navy ===
- A detachment of 33 sailors, Lieutenant Charles Spendelowe, R.N. (commanding) KIA, two midshipmen, two boatswain's mates, one carpenter, and twenty-seven able seamen. (Note: Two additional members of the detachment (an able seaman and a midshipman) were left sick in Frederick and Fort Cumberland, and not present for the battle.)

=== Indian Department ===
- Captain George Croghan (interpreter)
- Captain Andrew Montour (interpreter)
- Seven Indian scouts, Scarouady (leader)

=== Provincial troops ===
==== Virginia ====
- Captain Polson's Carpenters, Captain William Polson (commanding) KIA
- Captain Mercer's Carpenters, Captain George Mercer (commanding)
- Captain Stephen's Rangers, Captain Adam Stephen (commanding) WIA
- Captain Waggoner's Rangers, Captain Thomas Waggoner (commanding)
- Captain Peyronnie's Rangers, Captain William Peyronnie (commanding) KIA
- Captain Hogg's Rangers, Captain Peter Hogg (commanding)
- Captain Cocke's Rangers, Captain Thomas Cocke (commanding)
- Captain Lewis' Rangers, Captain Andrew Lewis (commanding)
- Captain Stewart's Mounted Rangers or Virginia Light Horse Troop, Captain Robert Stuart (commanding)

==== North Carolina ====
- North Carolina Provincial Regiment (Major Edward Brice Dobbs commanding)

== French Crown ==
- Captain Daniel Liénard de Beaujeu (commanding officer) KIA

=== Compagnies Franches de la Marine ===
- 105 officers and men (3 officers, 20 cadets, 72 other ranks)
  - Captain Daniel Liénard de Beaujeu (see above).
  - Captain Jean-Daniel Dumas
  - Ensign Charles Michel Mouet de Langlade

=== Canadian militia ===
- 146 militiamen

=== Indian Allies ===
- Seven Nations of Canada
  - Hurons
  - Abenaki
- From the Pays d'en Haut
  - Odawa
  - Lenni Lenape

A total of 640 warriors.
