= British soldiers in the eighteenth century =

c. 1795 illustration of musket drills used by British soldiers

The experience of British soldiers in the eighteenth century would have depended on where they were stationed, the time period and who they were fighting. The British Army underwent significant changes during the eighteenth century, mainly to ensure they would be able to perform well in the numerous wars that Great Britain participated in during the century, such as the War of the Spanish Succession, the War of the Austrian Succession, the Seven Years' War, the American Revolutionary War, and the French Revolutionary Wars.

Life for a British soldier was often harsh and unforgiving. Discipline was strict in the British Army, with harsh punishments commonly meted out for even minor offences. This was in part a reaction to the constant gambling, whoring, drinking, and brawling that British soldiers participated in due to a variety of reasons. A significant amount of training was required before a British soldier was allowed to be sent into the field; while harsh, this allowed the British to become one the foremost powers in Europe by the end of the century.

== A soldier in the army ==
1780 caricature of three working class men being enlisted into the British Army

The British Army in the 18th century was commonly seen as disciplined, regimented and harsh. Camp life was dirty and cramped with the potential for a rapid spread of disease, and punishments could be anything from a flogging to a death sentence. Yet, many men volunteered to join the army, to escape the bleak conditions of life in the cities, for a chance to travel the world and earn a regular wage.

There were a number of names used to describe the variety of groups serving within the army, including the militia, fencibles, associations, volunteers, yeomanry, rangers, local militia and provisional cavalry. Although many of the men rarely saw active service abroad, the army was often used as a constabulary force within the British Isles and it was often questioned whether a standing force was actually needed. However, the growth of the British Empire in the 19th century demanded the use of an established imperial force.

=== Nature of recruitment ===
During the 18th century, men who joined the army were recruited in a number of ways. The regular army used recruitment parties and occasionally press gangs to enlist men, while the militia regiments were raised by a ballot, a process that was established in the Militia Act 1757: "Thirty-two thousand men, all of them good Protestants, were to be ... subjected to martial law in time of active service". There were also many part-time forces, often called volunteers, and they were not in short supply. Becoming a volunteer exempted men from the militia ballot and part-time service as a volunteer was certainly easier than disciplined life with the militia or regular army.

Motivations behind the volunteering nature were not solely patriotic, but also commonly economic. Many men who joined as volunteers and went on to serve with the regular army were unemployed urban dwellers, and prospects of a standard income were better than none at all. Tradesmen could be sure to make a tidy profit from selling their wares to the soldiers, and sutlers often became camp followers, following a regiment, while on campaign. Certainly more applicable to the landed and wealthy gentlemen, fears of invasion also persuaded many to serve; not so much to support the nation as a whole, but to preserve their own interests, money and property which could be lost if the enemy succeeded.

==== Officers ====
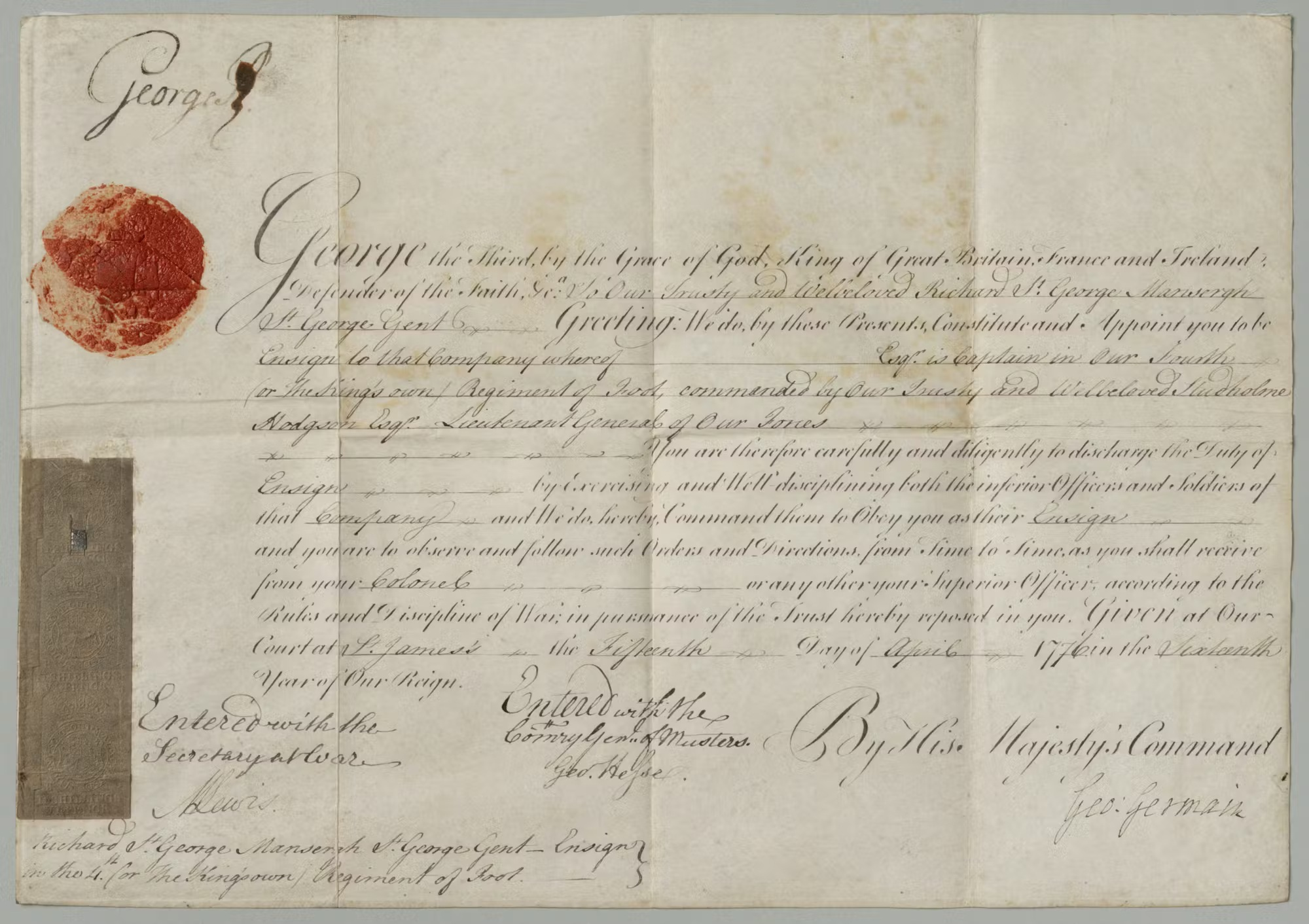
Richard St George's commission as an ensign in the 4th Regiment of Foot, issued on 15 April 1776

Between 1683 and 1871 officer's commissions in English and later British infantry and cavalry regiments could be purchased. Such purchases were often seen as "proof of gentlemanly status" as commissions were expensive – at approximately £450 – and usually only the wealthy could afford them, with landed families purchasing commissions for their sons. John Cookson suggests that serving with the army did command a certain respect, and those men that became the holder of an office "could lay claim to the title of [being a] gentleman". Therefore, self-interest, respect and status were enticing prospects for many who were to join the army. Only a small proportion of officers were from the nobility; in 1809, only 140 officers were peers or peers' sons. A large proportion of officers came from the Militia, and a small number were gentlemen volunteers, who trained and fought as private soldiers but messed with the officers and remained as such until vacancies (without purchase) for commissions became available.

The Duke of York oversaw a reform of the sale of commissions, making it necessary for officers to serve two full years before either promotion or purchase to captain and six years before becoming a major, improving the quality of the officers through the experience gained.

=== Equipment and weaponry ===
During the 18th century the weapon of choice was the Brown Bess musket which had been used by the army since the 1730s. There were many different patterns of musket fired during the 18th century, but the weapon normally favored a flintlock mechanism which was more reliable than the preceding matchlock system used during the English Civil War in the 17th century. The pike had been replaced by the use of the bayoneted musket in the early 18th century. Bayonets were used in conjunction with the musket for close-range fighting – the bayonet was fitted into the socket of the musket barrel, allowing it to be fired while the bayonet was fixed (unlike earlier screw or plug bayonets) and effectively turned the musket into a pike-like instrument.

A well-trained soldier could fire up to three rounds per minute, soldiers completely off-target or too slow at priming and loading would often be lightly punished. The use of the platoon formation by the British army meant that a constant volley of fire could be employed. There was much that could go wrong with the musket – from misfires in wet weather, to the gun firing at random due to sparks which set the powder off. In the heat of battle, a soldier may forget to remove the ramrod from the barrel before firing. Nonetheless, the musket proved to be the go to beyond 30 paces, modern test firings at individual human-sized targets suggest that a musket's effective range lies somewhere between 70 and 100 yards (or 64 and 91 meters).

=== Camp ===
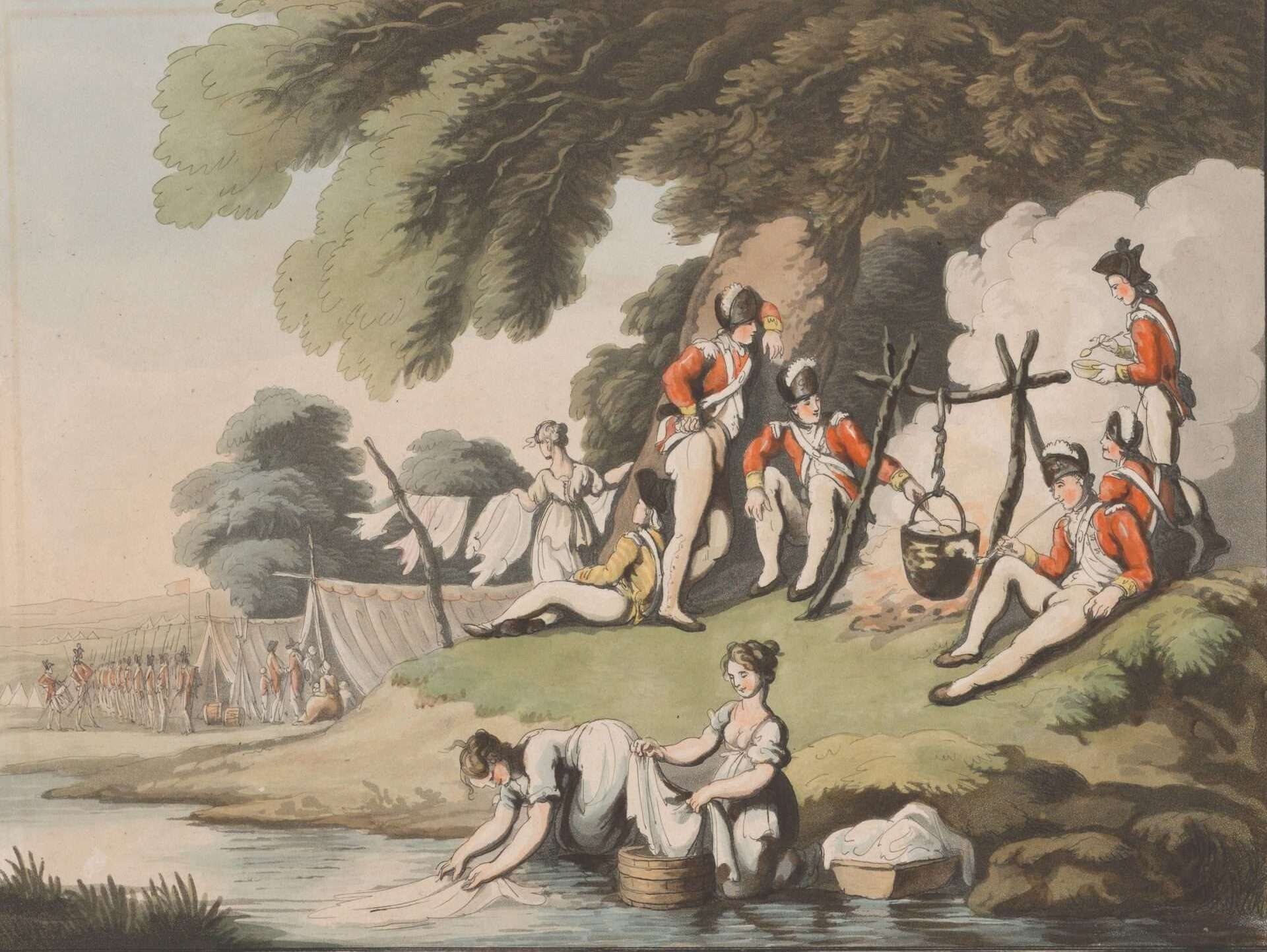
1798 engraving of a British military camp

On an 18th-century battlefield, the military camp set up by a regiment would have been extremely simplistic in terms of possessions and comforts. Only the very basic necessities would have been taken as everything a regiment needed had to be carried while on the move. A traditional regiment of foot, made up of ten companies of approximately 792 men, would have carried a set of camp equipment that included 160 tents, 160 tin kettles with bags, 160 hand hatchets, 12 bell tents, 12 camp colours, 20 drum cases, 10 powder bags, 792 water flasks with strings, 792 haversacks and 792 knapsacks.

The proportion of tents and equipment would have varied depending on the size of the companies, and the baggage itself would have differed according to the type of regiment. A regiment of Dragoons, for example, would have needed to carry extra equipment for their horses including nose bags and horse pickets. Conditions in camp were normally inadequate as a site had to be set up wherever space was available – basic amenities such as fresh running water would have to be collected from nearby sources and latrines often had to be dug once camp had been set up. Personal space would have been limited, but this commonly created a sense of camaraderie between the soldiers who lived among each other on a daily basis.

When a regiment was not on the battlefield they would have been settled in an established barrack or billet. However, life was usually not any more comfortable; a mess group of 5–6 men, led by a corporal, could be expected to share living quarters and necessities, and sometimes men would share a blanket for sleeping.

=== Discipline and punishment ===
1794 caricature of a squad of British troops being trained

Life in the army was extremely disciplined and even minor matters of misconduct did not go unpunished. The courts – either regimental, district or general – were advised by a military lawyer and made up of panels of officers, with some sentences even being determined by the commander-in-chief.

The main crimes normally concerned drunkenness, theft and general misbehaviour. The wrong-doer may be punished by running the gauntlet which involved being flogged by one's own regiment as he passed between two lines of soldiers. In 1765, a soldier was picquetted (made to stand on a tent-peg) without shoes for drunken misconduct.

One of the more common offences that required excessive punishment was desertion. A man could be branded with a "D" if captured, and if he re-offended could face execution. Death sentences were not all that common, with hanging normally reserved for murderers, and death by shot employed for those who were repeat offenders. One such case involved Joseph Stoakes who, between 1728 and 1730, deserted his regiment three times, and upon being captured for the third time was sentenced by court martial to death.

The criminals were punished in front of their peers and officers and the utter humiliation suffered was meant to deter from any further wrongdoing. Punishments were often painful and disgraceful to discourage those who witnessed them from undergoing the same fate. However, it was customary for a soldier to be accepted back into his regiment without any discredit once he had been punished.

=== Camp followers ===
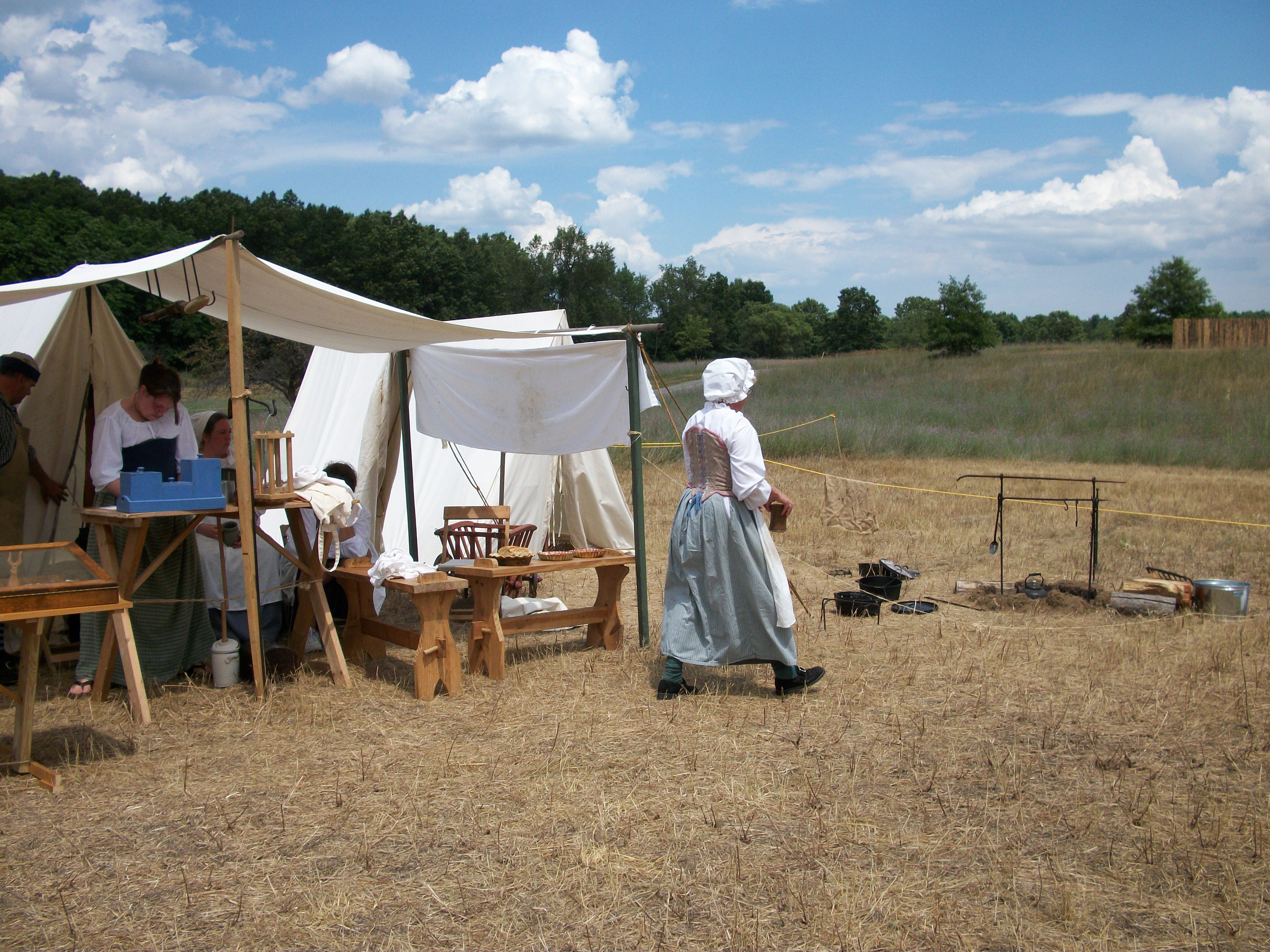
American re-enactors portraying camp followers of the British Army during the French and Indian War

While on campaign, the army would gather a large group of followers ranging from sutlers, who would sell commodities to the soldiers, to the wives and women who chose to follow their men into war.

The ratio of women following the army varies widely over the period, ranging up to 17 women per 100 men in some theatres of the American Revolution. These women were expected to work and carry out any of the services required by the soldiers: cooking and washing were common domestic duties but these women often doubled up as nurses and carers. Receiving a wage from the army meant that they could earn a decent living as a camp follower. The sutlers could also make a profit by selling their wares – coffee, liquor, beer etc. – to those they followed.

The camp followers were usually subject to the same military law as the men themselves: a sutler could be flogged or even killed if found to be trading without a licence, and common offences included stealing and disobeying of direct orders.

There were many complaints about the presence of women and children in camp who distracted the men from their duties or made a general nuisance of themselves with one such protest made to Whitehall on 23 January 1720: "Complaint having been made, that you permit women and children to lye in the barracks ... take care that the Master Gunner meets with no discouragement or interruptions in the execution of his duty".

== The life of a British soldier ==
A career as a British soldier could be extremely challenging. The dress uniforms provided were often uncomfortable, and could restrict movement; although when on campaign soldiers would frequently augment their uniform to make them more comfortable and practical. Soldiers received a daily wage after their sign up bounty, though once equipment and food had been purchased, they were left with little in the way of luxuries.

=== Clothing ===
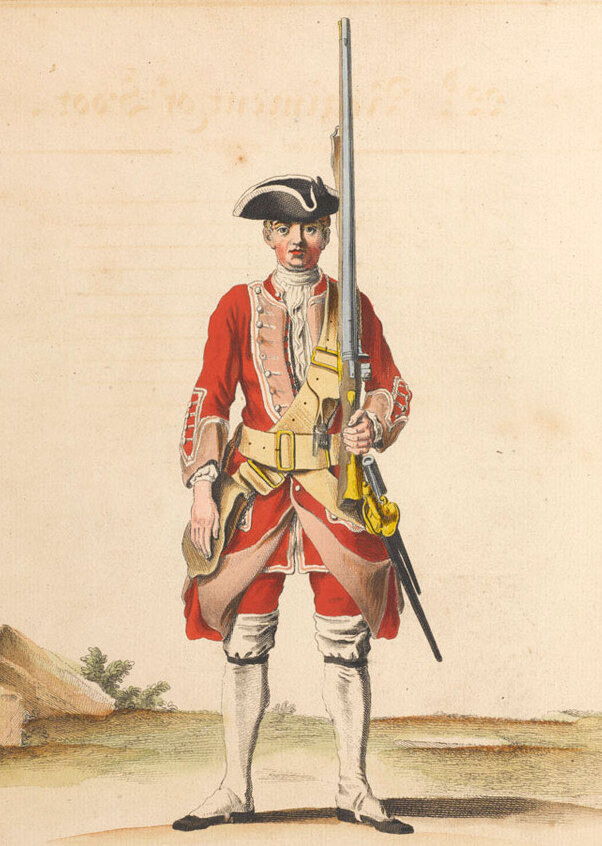
c. 1742 engraving of a private of the 22nd Regiment of Foot

The March of the Guards to Finchley (William Hogarth, 1750)

When marching into war a soldier would have worn the traditional red uniform consisting of the distinctive regimental coat, a white shirt, grey trousers to be held up by a pair of braces, shoes and a cap. The cap may have differed depending on the regiment, but a traditional pattern was the tricorne to be replaced by the stovepipe shako. This too would be replaced in the majority of regiments by the widespread use of the Belgic shako by 1812, as displayed by the 33rd Regiment of Foot. A greatcoat, fashioned in grey wool, would be worn and was normally tied on top of the haversack or knapsack which was carried by the men while on the move.

In some cases, it was the bright colours and flamboyant nature of the uniform that attracted men to the army. The opportunity to wear something as distinctive as the regimental red could be tempting; a new and vivid uniform would have been a change from the drab colours worn by most men in everyday society and soldiers frequently drew interest from admiring women.

A white dress consisting of a shirt, trousers and a forage cap would be worn when the men were based in camp. This uniform was much lighter than the one worn for war, being made from linen and the caps from wool, and therefore allowing the men to work in comfort during encampment.

To identify the numerous regiments from one another the colours of the facings on the dress would have differed to reflect the regimental colours. For example, the 24th Regiment of Foot used "Willow Green" facings "lined with white", while the 33rd Regiment of Foot used red facings with a "white lining". Another way the units were distinguished from one another was the use of flags (colours). As the War Office document WO 26/21 stated, "The Camp Colours to be the Colour of the Facing of the Reg with the Rank of the Reg in the center, those of the Horse to be square, and those of the Dragoon Guards, or Dragoons, to be swallow-tailed".

There were also stipulations as to the way the men wore their hair. At a time when most of the troops would have had long hair, the regulation was to wear it queued. It was to be "tied a little below the upper part of the collar of the coat, and to be ten inches in length" with one inch of hair below the tie. Soldiers were not allowed to cut their hair as it prevented the queued appearance.

Officers' uniforms were usually in brighter colours and had different styles. They also had different insignia, and a decorative metal plate over the neck called a gorget.

It was common for infantry soldiers to wear a cross belt consisting of two white buff leather straps which made an X across their chests; one belt held a bayonet and the other a cartridge box. Officers wore one shoulder belt which often supported a sabre scabbard or pistol cartridge box, since they did not carry a musket. The belts had a plate at the centre which identified a soldier's regiment. Soldiers were issued white pipe clay which was used to whiten the belts to maintain their appearance.

=== Food ===
When on campaign, soldiers would normally be supplied with an allowance of bread, meat, oatmeal or rice and either beer or rum to wash it down with. A typical daily allowance for a group of up to six men consisted of 6 lb (2.7 kg) of bread or flour, 10 1/2 lb (4.5 kg) of beef, 1 1/2 lb (0.7 kg) of rice or oatmeal and 8 gills (2 pints) of rum. A soldier in camp could expect to be provided with a loaf of bread for which would last about four days.

A common recipe for feeding the troops was beef broth and potatoes – a hearty, warm and filling meal that could normally feed up to eight men. Stews and meat pies were regularly cooked and small beer – for which a man received around 5 pints per diem – and rum were watered down in order to last and deter the men from drunken behaviour. Small beer was often brewed to kill any germs that was present in the water, and was one way in which to reduce the spread and rates of disease. Drinking was used as a method to relax at the end of the day and was a leisurely activity that allowed the men to unwind. It was believed that this would boost morale and enhance the sense of camaraderie between the soldiers.

Food was often shipped out to the troops, but shortages owing to problems with shipping became a common occurrence, and it was therefore much easier to live off the land on which they were stationed, or to buy from locals. Vegetables were also grown and livestock procured to help feed the troops, but there were many reports of soldiers sickening due to a lack of proper nourishment. The level to which troops were adequately fed varied, being dependent on the nature of the terrain the army was operating in and on the skill of their senior commanders.

=== Pay ===
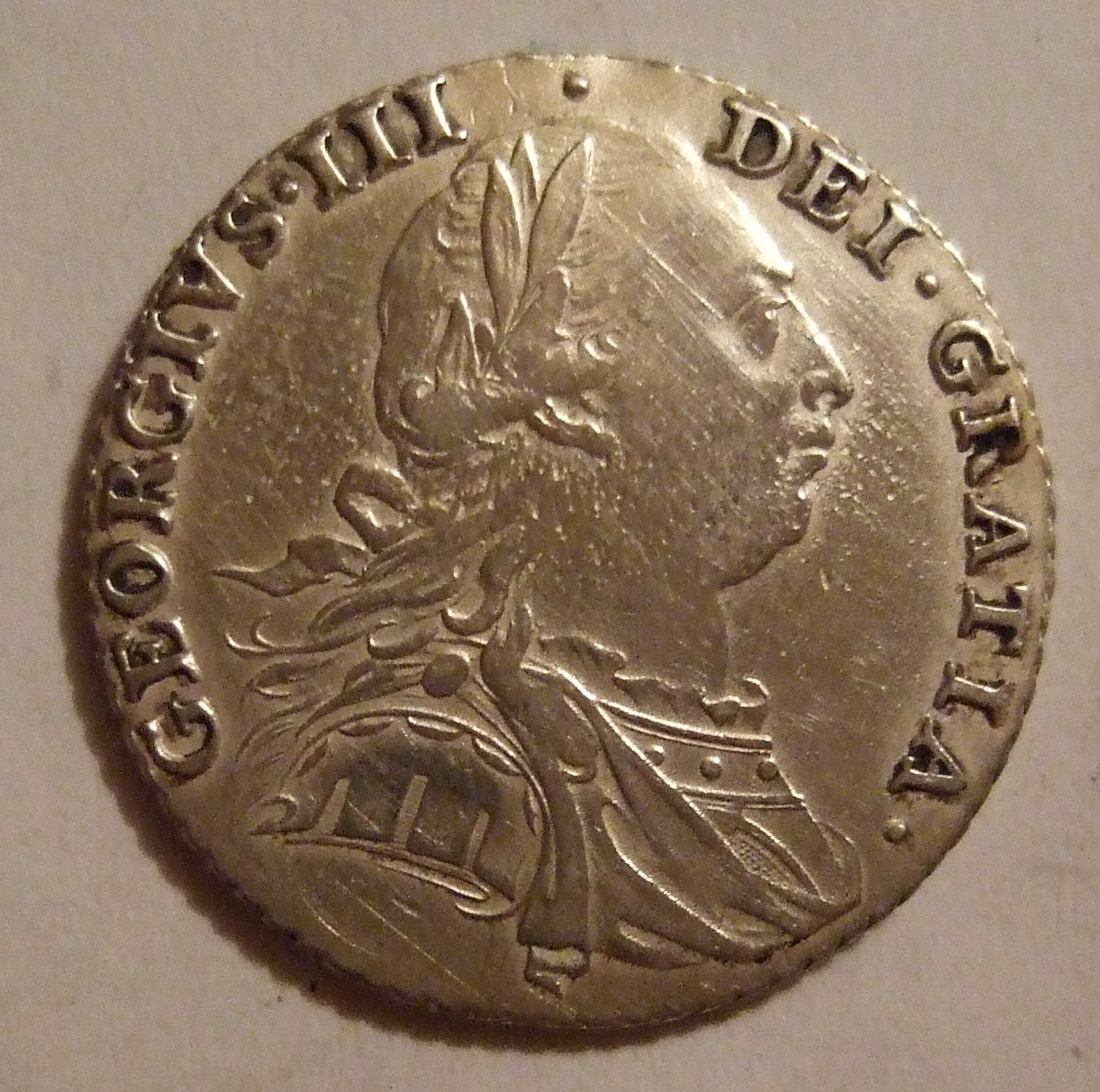
A shilling bearing the face of George III. Prospective British soldiers were often paid the King's shilling when joining the army.

The daily pay of a British soldier differed with respect to their position within the army. A sergeant could expect to be paid between 1s 6d and 2s 6d depending on whether he served with an infantry or cavalry regiment. A trumpeter could be paid up to 2s 8d, while a drummer may have been paid 3s if he served in a cavalry regiment. A private may have been paid 8d if serving with a regiment of foot but received almost 2s 6d if serving in a cavalry regiment. In comparison, a labourer in the mid-18th century would have earned a daily wage of 2s, and a collier a weekly salary of 13s 6d.

A soldier would have to pay for food and forage beyond the supplied rations – and for any other extras such as beer – out of his wage. A loaf of bread usually cost around 5d, while a dragoon soldier, earning 1s 6d daily, would have paid 6d for a ration of forage consisting of 18 lb (8 kg) of hay and one peck (16 dry pints) of oats. From 1800 onwards soldiers received a daily beer money allowance in addition to their regular wages. The practice was started on the orders of The Duke of York.

Considering the prices of camp necessaries during this period, many items cost a few shillings: a haversack could be purchased for 3s 6d while leather powder bags could be found for 7s. Dragoons may have purchased a nose bag for the sum of 2s and a drum case would be worth 10s. The larger items such as tents would obviously cost more; it cost approximately £4 10s for a complete round tent and £2 12s for a bell tent for arms. Normally, the tents would be provided by the Board of Ordnance, but other necessities may have been purchased by the colonel of the regiment who would later be reimbursed.

Pay in the British Army 1735 (per diem)
Rank	Horse	Dragoons	Foot
Colonel	£2 1s 0d	£1 15s 0d	£1 4s 0d
Lieutenant-colonel	£1 9s 6d	£1 4s 6d	17s 0d
Major	£1 7s 0d	£1 0s 6d	15s 0d
Captain	£1 1s 6d	15s 6d	10s 0d
Lieutenant	15s 0d	9 s 0d	4s 8d
Cornet	14s 0d	-	-
Ensign	-	8s 0d	3s 8d
Quartermaster	8s 6d	5s 6d	4s 8d
Chaplain	6s 8d		
Surgeon	6s 0d		4s 0d
Surgeon's Mate	-	-	2a 6d
Adjutant	5s 0d		4s 0d
Kettle Drummer	3s 0d	-	-
Trumpeter	2s 8d	-	-
Drummer	-	2s 0d	1s 0d
Serjeant	-	-	1s 6d
Corporal	3 s 0d	2s 0d	1s 0d
Hautboys	-	2s 0d	-
Private Man	2s 6d	1s 6d	0s 8d

Pay in the Train of Artillery 1701 (per diem)
Rank	Staff	Gunners	Pioneers
Colonel	£1 5s 0d	-	-
Major	15s 0d	-	-
Engineer	10s 0d	-	-
Captain	-	10s 0d	4s 0d
Lieutenant	-	6s 0d	-
Gentleman of the Ordnance	4s 0d	-	-
Paymaster	10s 0d	-	-
Chaplain	8d 0d	-	-
Surgeon	5s 0d	-	-
Assistant Surgeon	3s 0d	-	-
Adjutant	6s 0d	-	-
Kettle Drummer	4s 0d	-	-
Serjeant	-	2s 6d	2s 0d
Corporal	-	2s 0d	-
Gunner	-	1s 6d	-
Matross	-	1s 3d	-
Pioneer	-	-	1s 0d

Pay on the Irish Establishment 1785 (per diem)
Rank	Horse	Dragoons	Foot	Royal Irish Artillery
Colonel	£1 18s 0d	£1 11s 4d	£1 4s 6d	-
Colonel Commandant	-	-	-	£2 0s 0d
Lieutenant Colonel	£1 5s 0d	19s 4d	16s 6d	£1 0s 0d
Major	£1 2s 6d	17s 4d	14s 6d	15s 0d
Captain	17s 0d	12s 4d	9s 6d	10s 0d
Captain Lieutenant	-	-	4s 6d	6s 0d
First Lieutenant	-	-	-	5s 0d
Lieutenant	10s 6d	7s 2d	4s 6d	-
Second Lieutenant	-	-	-	4s 0d
Cornet	8s 6d	6s 2d	-	-
Ensign	-	-	3s 6d	-
Quartermaster	5s 0d	4s 0d	-	-
Serjeant Major	-	-	-	2s 6d
Serjeant	-	2s 6d	1s 6d	2s 0d
Corporal	2s 6d	1s 8d	1s 0d	1s 10d
Bombardier	-	-	-	1s 8d
Private Man	1s 6d	1s 2d	0s 6d	
Gunner	-	-	-	1s 0d

== Perception of the army ==
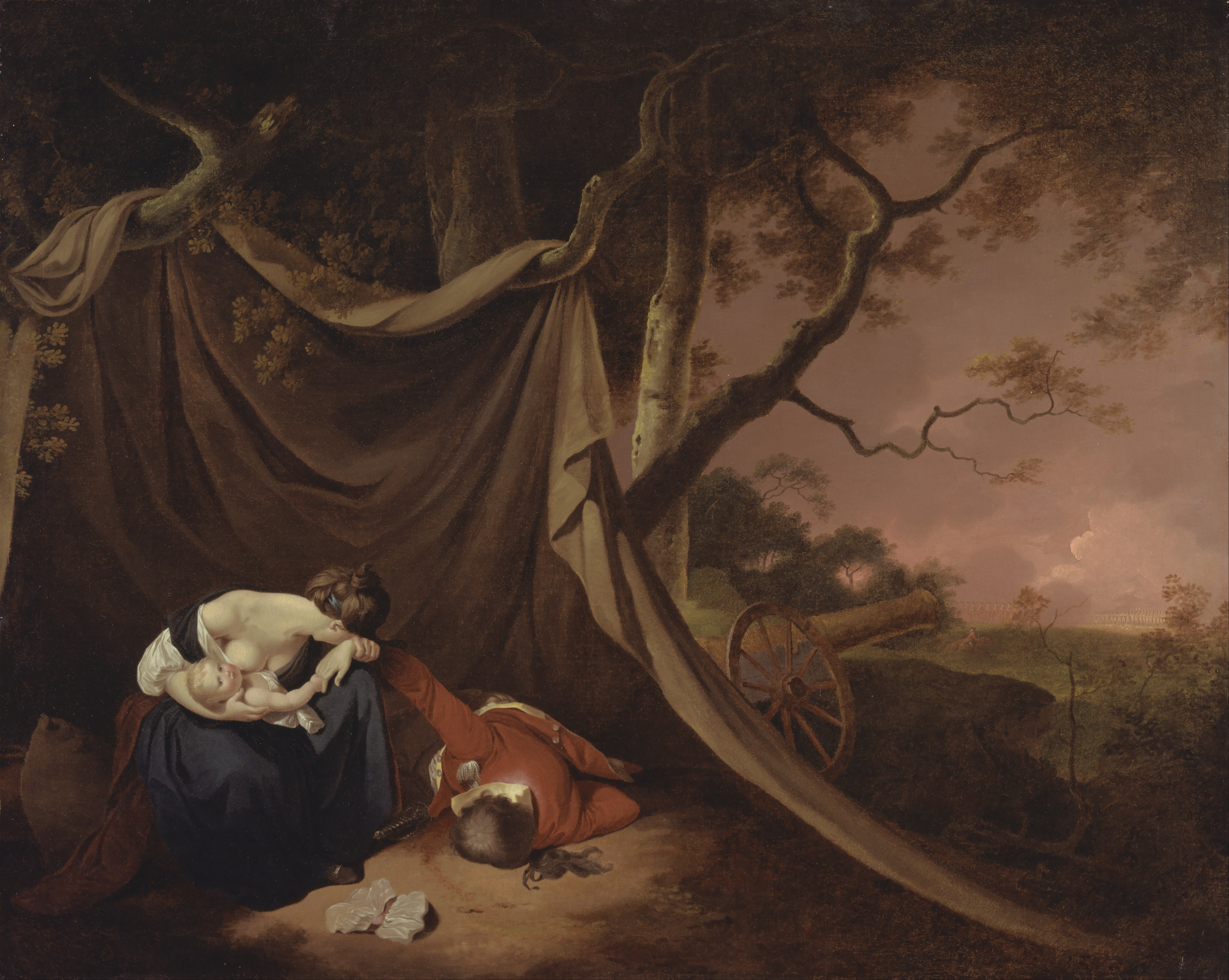
The Dead Soldier (Joseph Wright of Derby, c. 1789)

According to Samuel Johnson's Dictionary of the English Language, the term "redcoat" was a derogatory one, used as a "name of contempt for a soldier" with the word "soldier" itself being described as "one who serves for pay". In the American colonies the term "lobster" was applied to the redcoat soldier. The public perception of private soldiers varied with the times, they could be seen paradoxically as both subservient and destitute individuals while also being widely commemorated in times of victory and war. Patriotic parades and celebrations often included regular army units, the militia or local volunteer regiments, and were an important component of civic ceremony and pride. It must be recognised that although questions did arise as to the need for a standing force, when fears of an invasion were widespread, the speed with which the government was able to utilise its militia and volunteer forces suggests how "the unreformed British state rested on the active consent of substantial numbers of its inhabitants". The public perception of the British Army gradually changed as the long war with Revolutionary/Imperial France wore on, contributing to the Duke of York's structural, recruitment and training reforms in the early 1800s.

== See also ==
- Social background of officers and other ranks in the British Army, 1750–1815
- British military rations during the French and Indian War
- British Army during the French Revolutionary and Napoleonic Wars
- History of the British Army
- History of British light infantry
- List of British Army awards in the Napoleonic Wars
