= Jonathan Blanchard (statesman) =

American politician (1738–1788)

Jonathan Blanchard (September 18, 1738 – July 16, 1788) was an American lawyer, farm owner, and statesman from Dunstable, New Hampshire. He was a delegate for New Hampshire to the Continental Congress in 1784.

Jonathan was the son of Colonel Joseph Blanchard (1704–1758) and Rebecca (Hubbard) Blanchard (1710–1774) of Dunstable. He was the sixth of eleven children who lived to adulthood. His father, the Colonel, was also an active leader in New Hampshire as a judge in the Superior Court and member of the Governor's Council.

Jonathan was active in the New Hampshire Militia, rising to the rank of major by 1765. That year he married Rebecca Farwell (1739–1811) and they made their home in Dunstable for the rest of their lives. They would have six children: Rebecca (1766), Grace (1768), Sophia (1769), Abigail (1770), Charles (1776), and Elizabeth (1777).

As New Hampshire moved toward a revolutionary government, Blanchard was elected first to the Provincial Congress in 1775 and then to the state's House of Representatives in 1776. He served on New Hampshire's Committee of Safety from 1776 to 1778.

When a new government was established Blanchard served as the Attorney General for New Hampshire from 1777 until 1782. In 1783 he was named as a delegate to the Continental Congress but wasn't able to attend. He was re-appointed the following year, and took his seat in the Congress.

In 1784 Blanchard was elected to the New Hampshire State Senate. He was also named as Brigadier General of the state's militia, a position he held until his death. He died at home in Dunstable and was buried in the town's burying ground. Dunstable is now named Nashua, New Hampshire, and the cemetery is called the Old South Cemetery, located on the Daniel Webster Highway.
