= New Hampshire Provincial Regiment =

- Active: 1754–1763
- Country: Kingdom of Great Britain
- Allegiance: Province of New Hampshire
- Type: Line infantry
- Size: Regiment
- Part of: New Hampshire Militia and British Army
- Engagements: Lake George, Fort William Henry, Quebec and Montreal

Commanders
- Notable commanders: Joseph Blanchard, Nathaniel Meserve, John Hart and John Goffe

The New Hampshire Provincial Regiment was a provincial military regiment made up of men from the New Hampshire Militia during the French and Indian War for service with the British Army in North America. It was first formed in 1754 with the start of hostilities with France.

== 1755 ==
In 1755 Col. Joseph Blanchard was given command, and the regiment sent a company under Robert Rogers to build Fort Wentworth on the upper reaches of the Connecticut River before joining Sir William Johnson's army at Fort Edward in New York. During the Battle of Lake George, Col. Blanchard was in command at Fort Edward. When he heard the battle commence and saw the smoke of burning ox-carts he sent a company under Nathaniel Folsom to reinforce Sir William Johnson's army 14 miles (23 km) away. Capt. Folsom's company was able to capture the French baggage train and the French commanding officer Jean Erdman, Baron Dieskau, as the French and Indian forces tried to disengage from Sir William Johnson's main force. After the battle a second battalion was raised under the command of Col. Peter Gilman and sent to reinforce the army at Lake George. Both battalions left Fort Edward in December to return home to New Hampshire except for Robert Rogers' ranger company that stayed behind as part of the winter garrison.

== 1756 ==
In the spring of 1756 two more battalions were raised, with Col. Nathaniel Meserve in command. The 1st battalion was sent to Nova Scotia and the 2nd to the newly built Fort William Henry.

== 1757 ==
For the 1757 campaign two more battalions were raised. The 1st would again go to Halifax and the 2nd battalion under the command of Lt. Col John Goffe to Fort William Henery. Of the 200 men from the New Hampshire Provincial Regiment at Fort William Henry 80 were killed in the siege and massacre that followed. With the 1st battalion in Nova Scotia and the 2nd battalion regrouping at Fort Edward a new 3rd battalion of infantry with two attached companies of Dragoons was quickly raised under the command of Maj. Thomas Tash and sent to Fort at Number 4 to protect the western frontier of the state.

== 1758 ==
For the 1758 campaign again two battalions were raised. The 1st under Col. John Hart would join General Jeffrey Amherst in the capture of Fortress Louisbourg and the 2nd under Lt Col. Goffe was sent to join Gen. James Abercrombie in the defeat at the Battle of Carillon. The regiment and the attached rangers stayed on the flanks during the main assault and covered the retreat of the British Army preventing a complete disaster.

== 1759 & 1760 ==
In 1759 the 1st Battalion went with Gen. James Wolfe to Quebec City and the Battle of the Plains of Abraham serving in a support role followed by the Battle of Sainte-Foy and the subsequent siege of Quebec. Meanwhile, the 2nd battalion was with Gen. Amherst at the capture of Fort Ticonderoga and Fort St. Frédéric, driving the French from the Lake Champlain valley. In 1760, with the continuation of the 1759 Lake Champlain campaign, Col. Goffe commanded the New Hampshire troops who built the Crown Point Military Road from the Fort at Number 4 to the new English fort at Crown Point in forty days during the spring and at the Siege of Montreal and the fall of New France later that year.

== 1762 ==
Volunteers from the regiment were with the British Army that captured Havana, Cuba, from the Spanish on August 10, 1762.

Other notable members of the regiment were John Stark, William Stark, James Reed, Timothy Bedel, Isaac Wyman, Enoch Hale, Hercules Mooney and Abraham Drake. All of these men would go on to serve as officers during the American Revolutionary War.

== Sources ==
- Montcalm and Wolfe: The French and Indian War by Francis Parkman, DeCapo Press, New York, New York 1995
- A People's Army: Massachusetts Soldiers and Society in the Seven Years War by Fred Anderson, Univ. of North Carolina Press, Chapel Hill, NC 1984
- Redcoats, Yankees and Allies: A History of the Uniforms, Clothing and Gear of the British Army in the Lake George-Lake Champlain Corridor 1755–1760 by Brenton C. Kemmer, Heritage Books Inc., Bowie, MD 1998
- Colonel John Goffe: 18th Century New Hampshire by William Howard Brown, Lew A. Cummings Co., Manchester, NH 1950
- Louisbourg: From its Founding to its Fall by J.S. McLennan, Macmillan and Co. LTD London, UK 1918
- Colonial American Troops 1610–1774 (2) by Rene Chartrand, Osprey Pub. Oxford, UK 2002
- A List of the Revolutionary Soldiers of Dublin, N.H. by Samuel Carroll Derby Press of Spahr & Glenn, Columbus, Ohio 1901
