= British military rations during the French and Indian War =

What British soldiers ate during the 1754–1763 war in North America

During the French and Indian War, British military rations contained enough food energy to sustain the soldier in garrison but suffered from a lack of vitamins that could lead to nutritional deficiencies if not supplemented by the soldiers themselves through garden produce or purchase. During field conditions, the energy content tended to be too small. Colonial rations for provincial troops generally had a higher energy content.

== Victuals ==
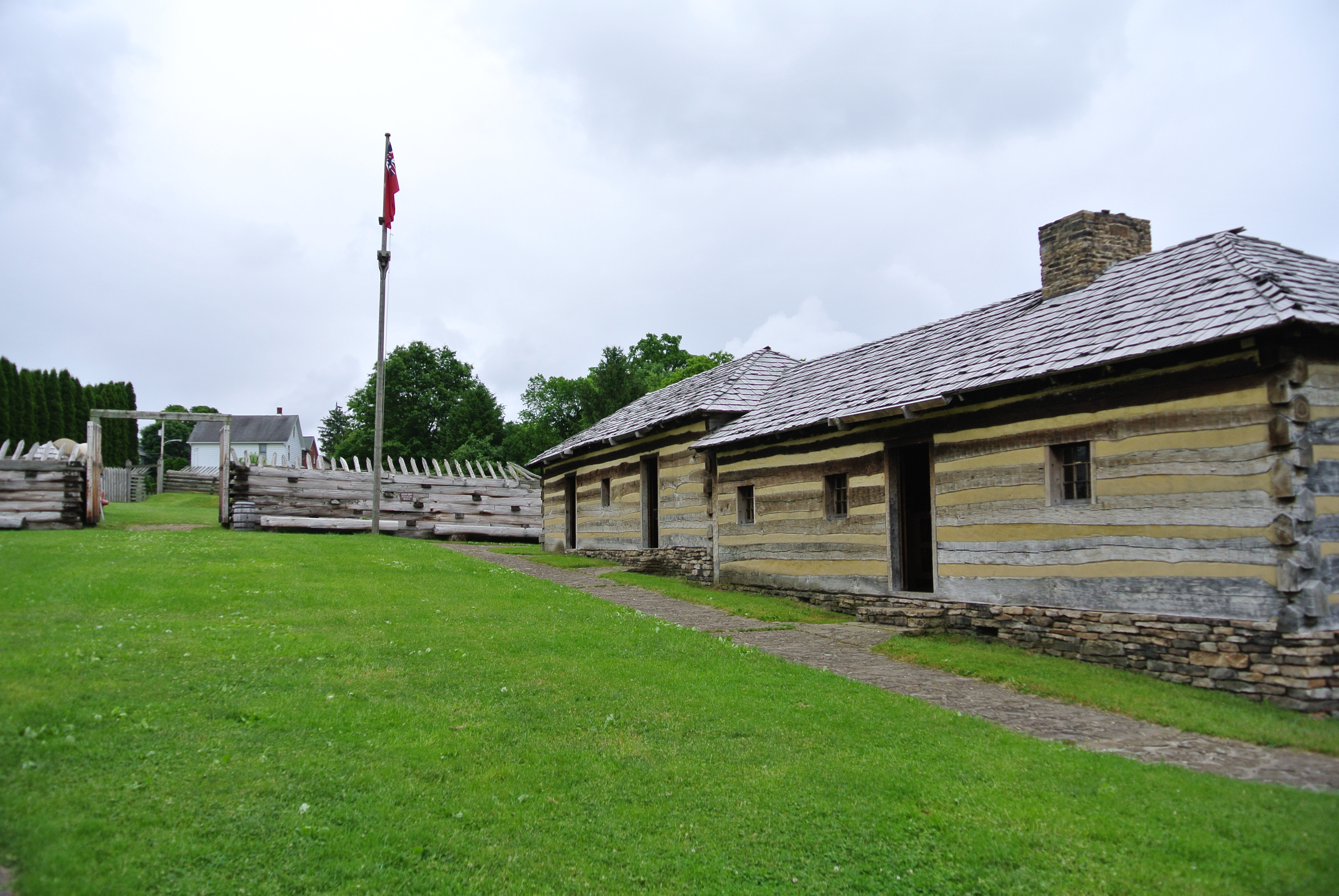
A barracks and a quartermaster store in the reconstructed Fort Ligonier

During the colonial wars the regular army was provisioned according to victualing acts enacted by the British Parliament. During the French and Indian War the daily allowance was as follows:

Food item	British	Metric
Bread or flour	1 pound	450 grams
Meat or Pork	1 pound 9 1/7 ounce	450 grams 260 grams
Butter	6/7 ounce	85 grams
Peas	3/7 pint	25 centiliters
Rice or oatmeal	11/7 pint	85 centiliters

Women permitted to accompany the army received half a ration per day, and children a quarter ration. Fresh bread and meat could be substituted with fresh or salt pork, hardtack, flour or corn meal. Additional provisions such as fruits, vegetables and cheeses were issued when available.

== Nutritional value ==
The enacted daily allowance had an energy content of 2,400 to 3,100 kcal per day, which was enough for garrison duty, but during field conditions it had to be supplemented in order to give sufficient energy. The main shortcoming was the lack of fresh food, especially fresh vegetables, which often led to outbreaks of scurvy, both in the field and in garrison. To avoid this, local spruce beer began to be used to supplement the rations (it provided the soldiers with additional vitamin C) . Spruce beer was not consistently used, however, but primarily in reaction to occurrences of scurvy. An army brewery was founded at Fort Pitt in 1765. During field conditions, the soldiers often went hungry as the supply chains could not be maintained due to long distances, primitive transportation and difficult terrain. Fresh food was also easily spoiled during hot summers.

== Supplements ==
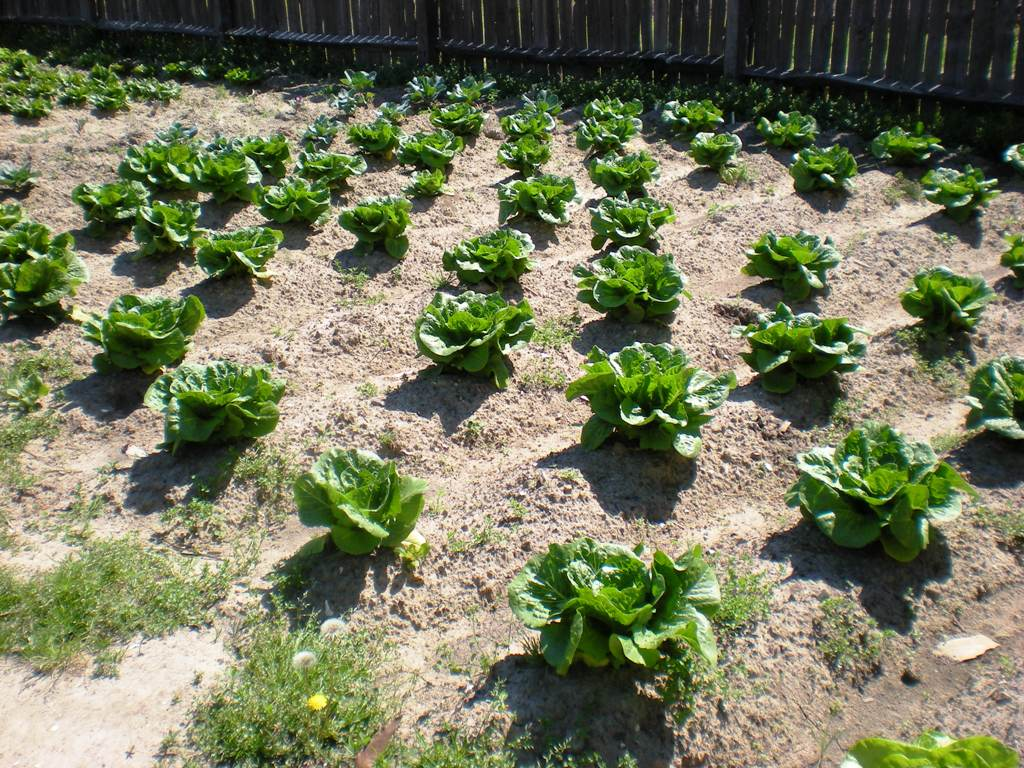
Garden with lettuce cultivated in an 18th-century manner

In garrison the regular ration was supplemented with vegetables from gardens tended by the soldiers during their spare time. Turnips, carrots and cabbage were the most common crops. Soldiers in towns could also buy food in the civilian marketplace, but at border forts or in the field, they were limited to what the sutlers sold. The margin for such purchases was limited, however, due to the many stoppages taken from the soldiers' pay, among them the cost for the issued ration. While marching through populated areas, the soldiers frequently resorted to foraging, often a euphemism for theft and robbery of food from the citizenry.

== Colonial rations ==
Provincial troops under local command were supplied according to colonial victualing regulations. They were more generous than the Victualing Act. The Massachusetts military ration had in addition to the British ration 1/2 pound (225 grams) sugar, 1 pint (47 centiliters) molasses and 7 gills (82 centiliters) of rum per week. When provincial troops formed part of the field army they were provisioned through the regular army supply chain and rations were issued according to the Victualing Act. According to Pennsylvania's Militia Supply Act of 1755, the weekly ration was 3 pounds (1.4 kilograms) of meat, 1 pound (455 grams) of fish, 10 1/2 pounds (4.8 kilograms) of bread and 7 gills (82 centiliters) of rum.

== Cooking ==
Rations for several days were issued at the same time to messes of 5-6 soldiers who also shared a tent. Each mess was issued a camp kettle and a camp axe. The food was cooked in the camp kettles over open fires burning in fire pits. The meat ration was usually boiled together with other ingredients to make a thick soup.

Bread was baked by civilian bakers and the bread ration issued every fourth day as a six-pound loaf. Fresh bread could be replaced by hardtack, made by civilian bakeries and kept in storage. At worst only flour was issued, and the soldiers had to use it as best they could; either mixing it into the heavy soup or by making firecakes.
