= John Hart (soldier) =

American soldier (1706–1777)

- Born: July 8, 1706; Dover, New Hampshire, U.S
- Died: October 30, 1777 (aged 71); Portsmouth, New Hampshire, U.S
- Military career
- Allegiance: Great Britain
- Branch: Militia
- Rank: Colonel
- Units: New Hampshire Militia; New Hampshire Provincial Regiment
- Conflicts: King George's War; French and Indian War

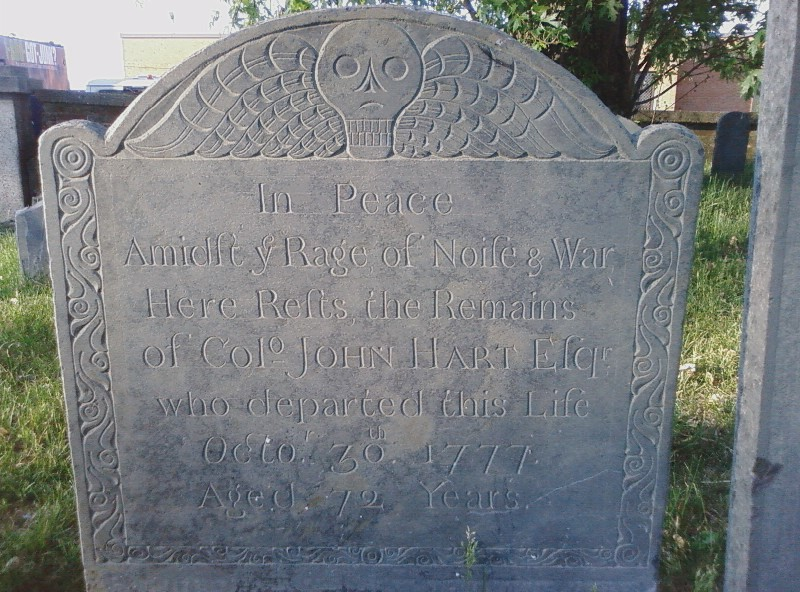
Col. John Hart's gravestone at the North Cemetery in Portsmouth, New Hampshire

Colonel John Hart (July 8, 1706 – October 30, 1777) was a militia officer during King George's War and the French and Indian War from the Province of New Hampshire.

== Biography ==
Hart was born in Dover, New Hampshire, to Mary Evans and Captain Samual Hart. He was married three times, to Mary Dennett, Abigal Landale and Sara Savill. Hart served in the New Hampshire Militia during the capture of Fortress Louisbourg from the French in 1745 by a force made up of militia from the New England colonies supported by the Royal Navy and commanded by William Pepperrell.

During the French and Indian War, Hart was promoted to colonel and commanded a battalion of the New Hampshire Provincial Regiment that was with General Jeffery Amhearst that again captured Fortress Louisbourg in 1758. Hart's Location, New Hampshire, is named for Colonel John Hart; this land was granted to him for his service during the French and Indian War.

He had at least two sons, Captain Thomas Hart and Benjamin Hart.

Hart died aged 71, at his house in Portsmouth, New Hampshire. In 1753, Hart sold to the city of Portsmouth the land for the North Cemetery where William Whipple, John Langdon and John Hart himself are all buried.

== See also ==
- Nathaniel Meserve, New Hampshire Colonel of the same era, whom Hart's men previously served under
