= Joseph Blanchard =

Colonel of the New Hampshire Provincial Regiment

- Born: 11 February 1704; Dunstable, New Hampshire, England
- Died: 7 April 1758 (aged 54)
- Allegiance: Great Britain
- Service years: 1724-1755
- Conflicts: 7 Years War Battle of Lake George
- Children: Jonathan and 11 others

Joseph Blanchard (11 February 1704 – 7 April 1758) was born in Dunstable, New Hampshire (now Nashua) on February 11, 1704 to Capt. Joseph Blanchard and his wife Abiah Hassell. In 1724 he joined the New Hampshire Militia as a lieutenant and served in Capt. Eleazer Tyng's Company. On September 26, 1728 he married Rebecca Hubbard of Groton, Massachusetts. They had 12 children, including Jonathan Blanchard, a New Hampshire delegate to the Congress of the Confederation in 1784.

Joseph Blanchard would serve as town selectman, a surveyor for the state of New Hampshire, Counsellor of the State by mandamus from the Crown, and Judge of the Superior Court of New Hampshire. At the start of the French and Indian War, Joseph Blanchard was already a colonel in the militia, and in 1754 he ordered Capt. John Goffe along with a company of men (Robert Rogers was part of this company) to patrol the upper reaches of the Merrimack River valley. In 1755, Joseph Blanchard was appointed as Colonel of the New Hampshire Provincial Regiment sent to serve under Sir William Johnson in an attack on Crown Point on Lake Champlain. Along the march they built Fort Wentworth at Northumberland, New Hampshire on the Connecticut River. The regiment was at Fort Edward and fought at the Battle of Lake George. The regiment returned home in December 1755. Col. Joseph Blanchard died on April 7, 1758. In 1761, a new more accurate map of New Hampshire that Joseph Blanchard had prepared in connection with Samuel Langdon was published.

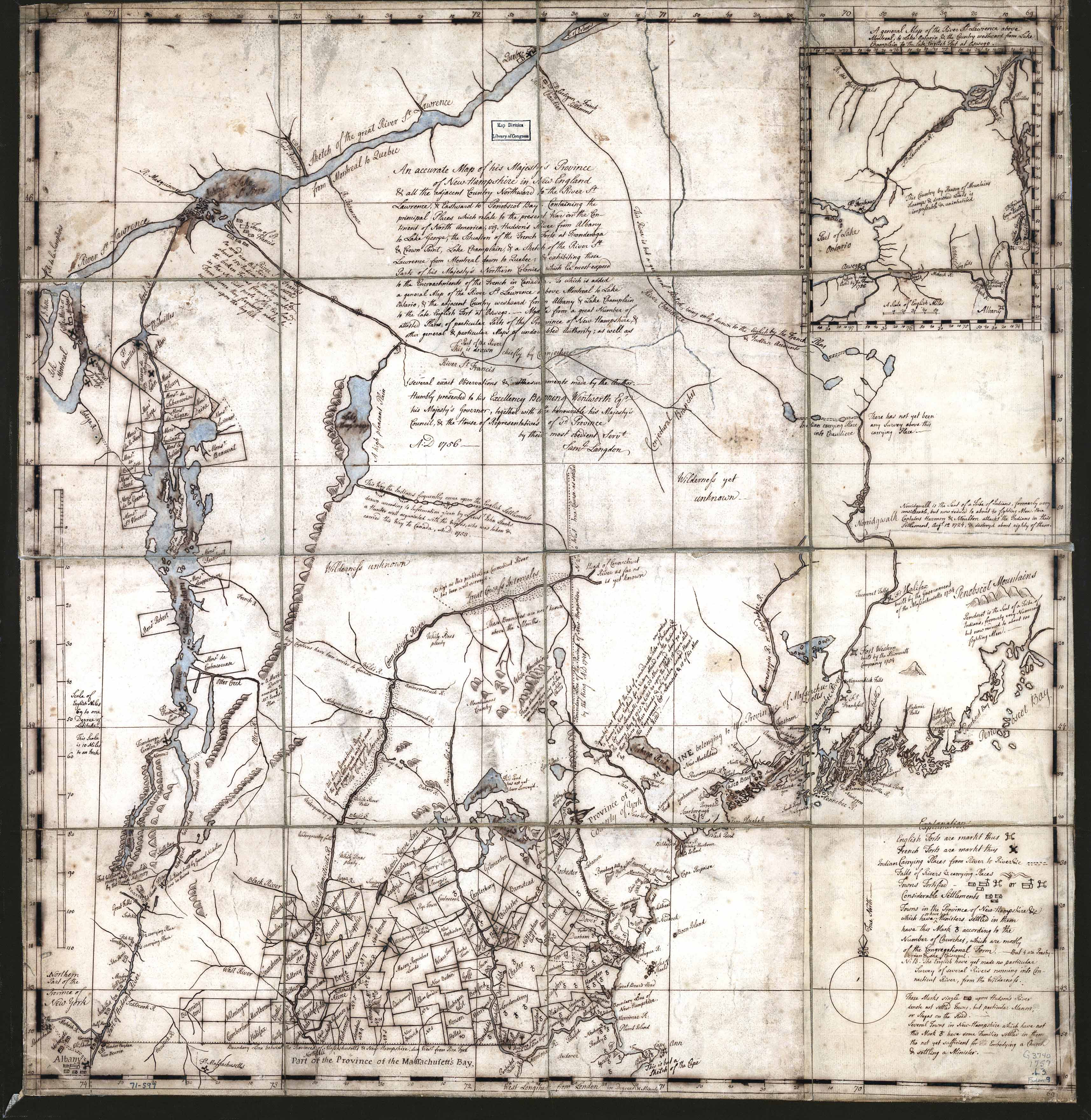
Map, 1756

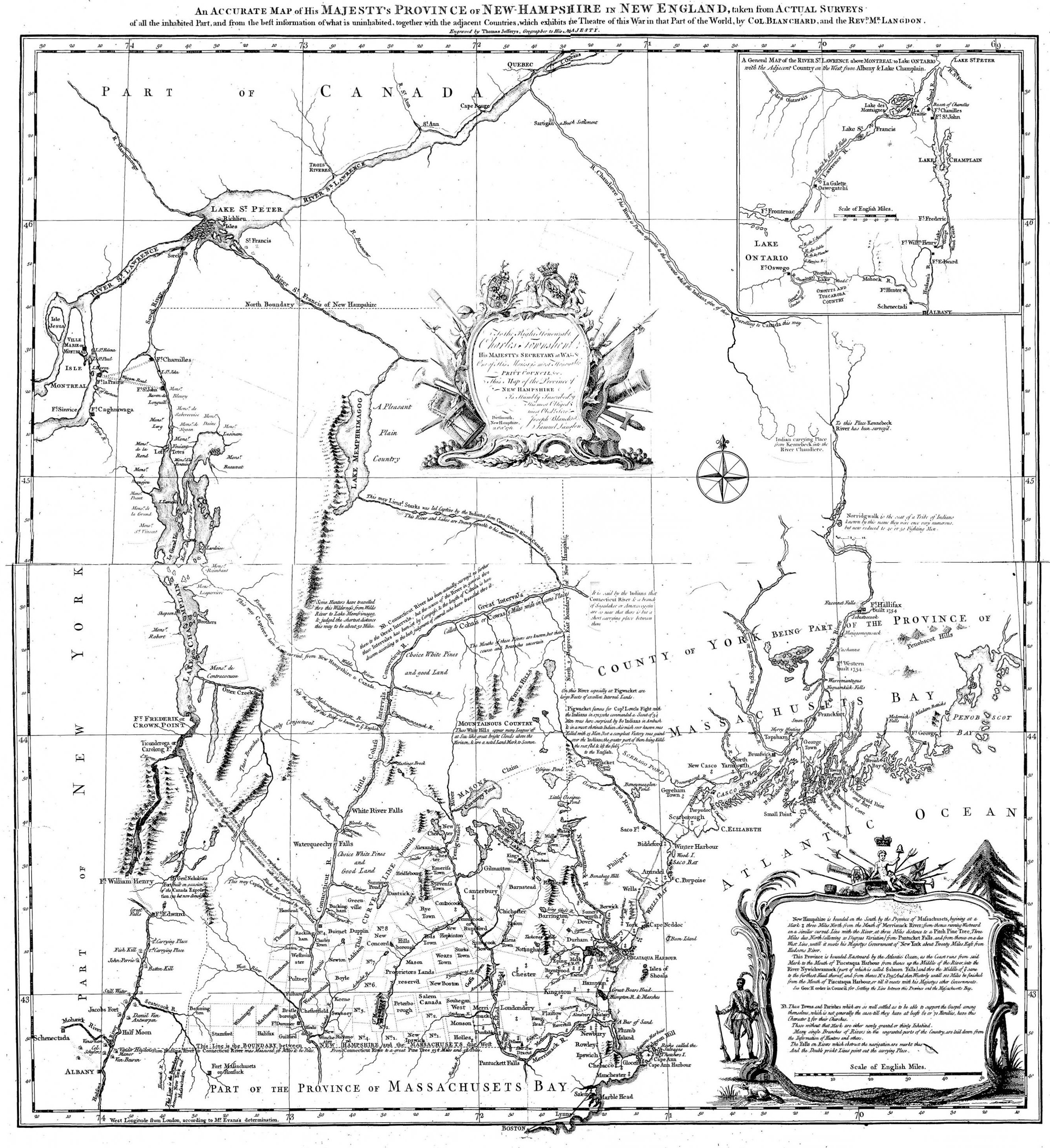
Map, 1761
