= Nathaniel Meserve =

American politician

Colonel Nathaniel Meserve (1704–1758) was an American shipbuilder and military officer.

== Background ==
Meserve was born in Portsmouth, New Hampshire, to Clement Maserve and his wife Elizabeth Jones.

On December 16, 1725, aged 21, he married Jane Libby and together they had ten children. Nathaniel Meserve would become a shipwright in his native Portsmouth, a hub of early American shipbuilding.

During King George's War Nathaniel was a lieutenant colonel in the New Hampshire Militia regiment at the 1745 capture of Fortress Louisbourg on Cape Breton Island. His shipbuilding experience allowed him to build sleds to transport the cannon over the marshy ground. In 1749 he was hired by the Royal Navy to build a 50 gun warship HMS America at his shipyard. During the French and Indian War Colonel Meserve led the New Hampshire Provincial Regiment in 1756 to Fort Edward New York and in 1757 to garrison Halifax, Nova Scotia.

In 1758 Col. Nathaniel Meserve was with General Amherst in another attack on Fortress Louisbourg because of his service in the 1745 capture of the fort. Here he contracted smallpox and died along with his eldest son.

== See also ==
- John Hart, New Hampshire military officer whom Meserve's men served under at the same time

== Sources ==
- Louisbourg: From its Founding to its Fall by J.S. McLennan, Macmillan and Co. LTD London, UK 1918
- The Taking of Louisburg 1745 by Samuel Adams Drake, Lee and Shepard Publishers Boston Mass. USA 1891 (reprinted by Kessinger Publishing ISBN 978-0-548-62234-6)
