= William Whipple =

American Founding Father (1730–1785)

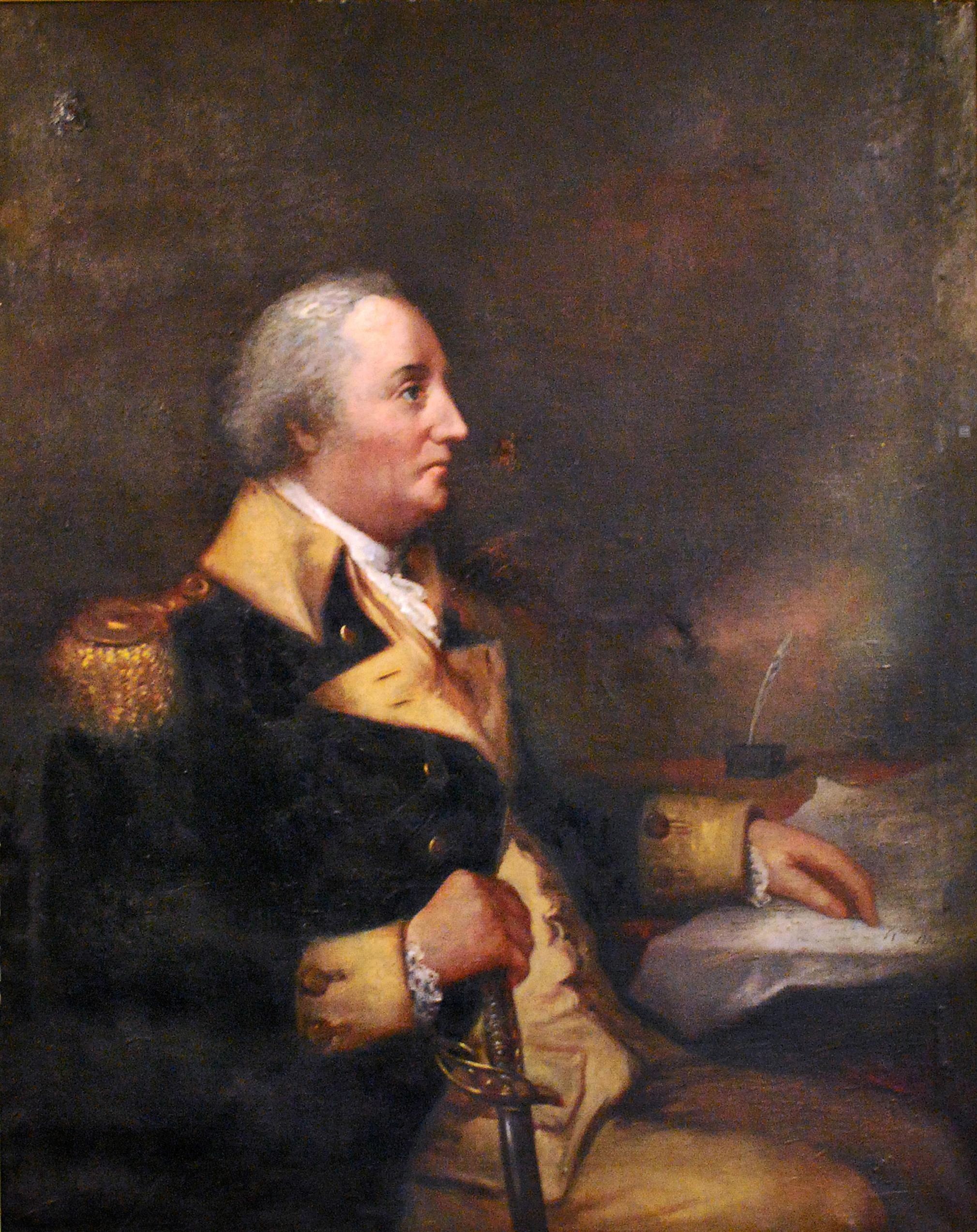
- 1897 portrait of Whipple by Walter Gilman Page
- Born: January 14, 1730; Kittery, Massachusetts (now Maine), British America
- Died: November 28, 1785 (aged 55); New Hampshire, U.S.
- Spouse: Catherine Moffat Whipple
- Military career
- Allegiance: United States
- Branch: Continental Army; New Hampshire Militia
- Rank: Brigadier general
- Commands: New Hampshire Militia (Bellow's Regiment of Militia, Chase's Regiment of Militia, Moore's Regiment of Militia, Welch's Regiment of Militia)
- Conflicts: American Revolutionary War; Battle of Saratoga; Battle of Bemis Heights; Battle of Bennington; Battle of Rhode Island

Signature
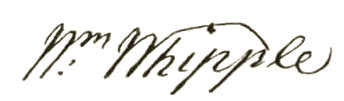

William Whipple Jr. (January 25, 1730 NS [January 14, 1730 OS] – November 28, 1785) was an American Founding Father and signatory of the United States Declaration of Independence. He represented New Hampshire as a member of the Continental Congress from 1776 through 1779. He worked as both a ship's captain and a merchant, and he studied in college to become a judge. He died of heart complications in 1785, aged 55.

== Early life and education ==
Declaration of Independence by John Trumbull (1818); Whipple is pictured sitting second from the left; next to fellow New Hampshire delegate Josiah Bartlett.

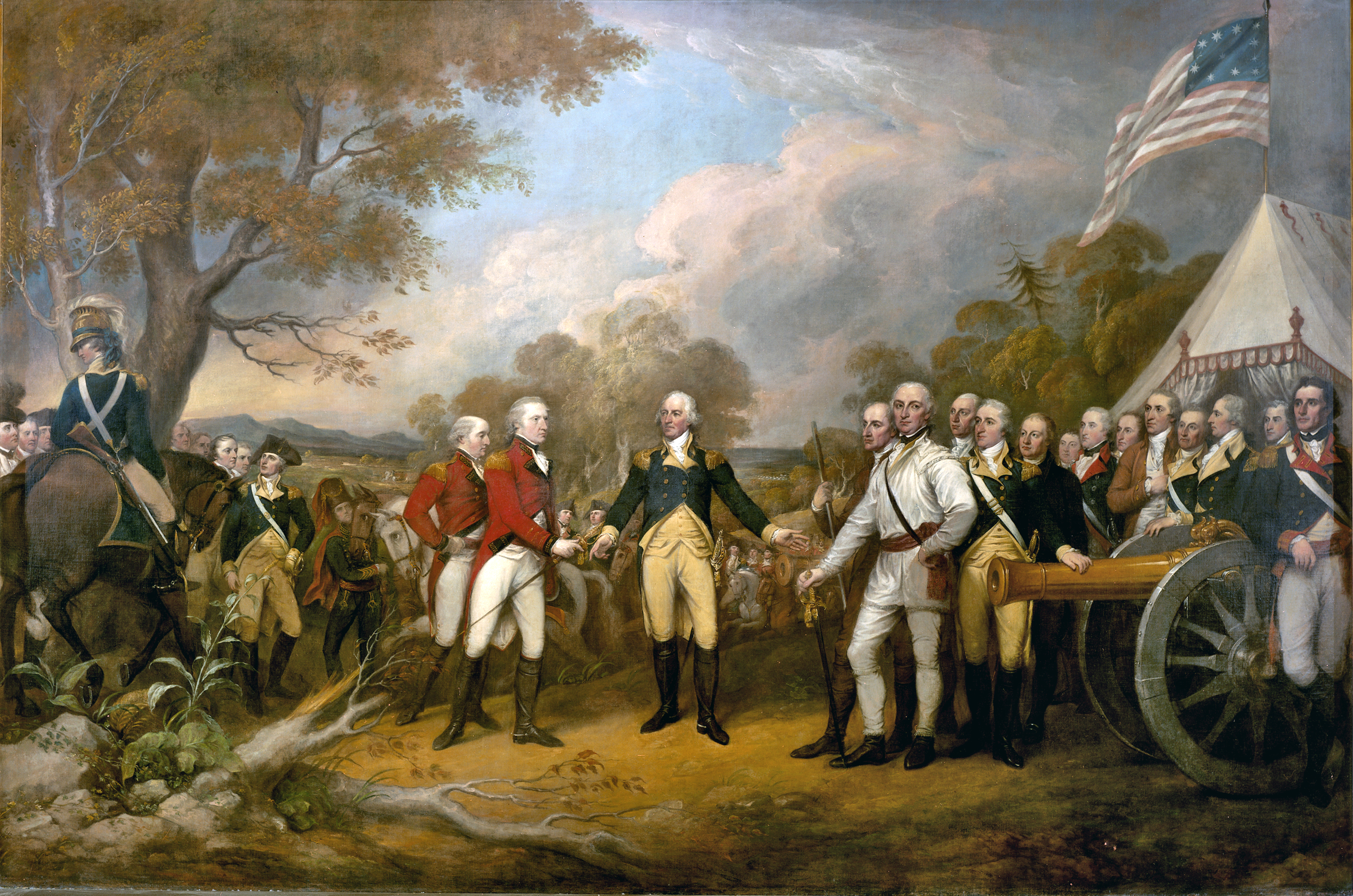
The Surrender of General Burgoyne by John Trumbull (1821); Whipple is fifth from the right, standing beside General John Glover

Whipple was born in Kittery in the Province of Massachusetts Bay (now Maine) in the William Whipple House to Captain William Whipple Sr. and his wife Mary (née Cutt). He was educated at a common school until he went off to sea, where he became a ship's master at age 21. He married his first cousin Catherine Moffat in 1767, and they moved into the Moffatt-Ladd House on Market Street in Portsmouth in 1769. Their son William Whipple III died in infancy. Whipple was a descendant of Samuel Appleton, early settler in Ipswich, Massachusetts.

Whipple earned his fortune participating in the triangular trade between North America, the West Indies, and Africa, dealing in wood, rum, and enslaved people. He established himself as a merchant in Portsmouth in 1759, in partnership with his brother Joseph.

== Political career ==
In 1775, New Hampshire dissolved the British Royal government and organized a House of Representatives and an Executive Council known collectively as a Provincial Congress. Whipple was elected to represent Portsmouth. He became a member of the Committee of Safety. He was then elected to the Continental Congress and signed the United States Declaration of Independence. He was the second cousin of fellow signatory Stephen Hopkins. In January 1776, Whipple wrote to fellow signatory Josiah Bartlett of the approaching convention:

This year, my Friend, is big with mighty events. Nothing less than the fate of America depends on the virtue of her sons, and if they do not have virtue enough to support the most Glorious Cause ever human beings were engaged in, they don't deserve the blessings of freedom.

Whipple freed his enslaved servant, Prince Whipple, believing that no man could fight for freedom and hold another in bondage. He wrote:

A recommendation is gone thither for raising some regiments of Blacks. This, I suppose will lay a foundation for the emancipation of those wretches in that country. I hope it will be the means of dispensing the blessings of Freedom to all the human race in America.

== Military career ==
The New Hampshire Provincial Congress gave Whipple his first commission in 1777. His enslaved servant Prince Whipple joined him, but challenged his position as a slave. Prince argued with William saying "You are going to fight for your Liberty, but I have none to fight for." William offered Prince his freedom if he continued his military service. Prince agreed and by the end of the war, William ended Prince's servitude and granted his freedom, according to the Portsmouth, New Hampshire, town records.

At Saratoga, Whipple commanded a brigade of four militia regiments. Whipple commanded Bellow's regiment, Chase's regiment, Moore's regiment, and Welch's regiment. As a result of their meritorious conduct at the Battle of Saratoga, Whipple and Colonel James Wilkinson were then chosen by Major General Horatio Gates to determine terms of capitulation with two representatives of General John Burgoyne. Whipple then signed the Convention of Saratoga, the effective surrender of General Burgoyne and his troops.

Whipple was then appointed along with several other officers to escort Burgoyne and his army back to Winter Hill, Somerville, Massachusetts. Whipple passed the news of the victory at Saratoga to Captain John Paul Jones, who informed Benjamin Franklin, who was in Paris at the time. News of the victory proved valuable to Franklin throughout alliance negotiations with the French. In 1778, Whipple followed his commanding officer, General John Sullivan to the Battle of Rhode Island, where he commanded Evans' regiment, Peabody's regiment, and Langdon's light horse regiment. After General Sullivan ordered a retreat, Whipple and other officers resided in a house near the battlefield. The approaching enemy fired a field piece from a range of three-quarters of a mile. The shot tore through a horse lashed outside the house and severely wounded the leg of one of Whipple's brigade majors, which later required amputation.

== Death ==
After the Revolution, Whipple became an associate justice of the Superior Court of New Hampshire. On November 28, 1785, he suffered from a heart ailment and died after fainting from atop his horse while traveling his court circuit. He was buried in what is now the Old North Cemetery in Portsmouth, New Hampshire. His headstone was replaced with a new memorial in 1976 in conjunction with the United States Bicentennial.

== See also ==
- New Hampshire Historical Marker No. 114: North Cemetery
- William Whipple House, his birthplace in Kittery
- Moffatt-Ladd House, his home in Portsmouth
- Memorial to the 56 Signers of the Declaration of Independence
