= Jonathan Chase (colonel) =

American soldier (1732–1800)

Jonathan Chase (December 6, 1732 – January 12, 1800) was a soldier in the American Revolutionary War.

Chase was born in Sutton, Province of Massachusetts Bay to Samuel Chase and his wife, Mary Dudley. As a young man, he moved to Cornish, New Hampshire and married Thankful Sherman of Grafton, New Hampshire on November 28, 1759. Together they had three children; Prudence, Elizabeth, and Mary. Born July 21, 1739; Thankful died at the age of 28 on November 25, 1768. Jonathan Chase remarried on October 22, 1770, to Sarah Hall; born December 15, 1742, and died October 13, 1806. Jonathan and Sarah had six children, Jonathan, 1771; David Hall, 1773; Sarah Hall, 1775; son Lebbeus Hall, 1779; Pamelia, 1780; and Gratia, 1782.

He was a farmer, a surveyor, a store keeper and a miller in the new township of Cornish. In 1775, with the coming of the American Revolutionary War, Chase was appointed colonel of the 13th New Hampshire Militia Regiment. Jonathan Chase led his regiment to Fort Ticonderoga in 1776 to support the Continental Army. His regiment served in Gen. William Whipple's Brigade of New Hampshire Militia during the Saratoga Campaign of 1777. At the surrender of Gen. John Burgoyne, Col. Chase drew up the Articles of Convention for the Surrender of General Burgoyne's Army for Gen. Horatio Gates. His regiment was also called up in 1780 in response to the Royalton Raid in Vermont. Chase was promoted to brigadier general in the State Militia of New Hampshire.

He died at his home in Cornish, New Hampshire.
