= Abraham Drake =

American military officer

- Born: December 4, 1715; Hampton, New Hampshire
- Died: August 1, 1781 (aged 65)
- Military career
- Allegiance: United States
- Rank: Colonel
- Commands: 2nd New Hampshire Militia Regiment
- Conflicts: French and Indian War; American Revolutionary War: Saratoga Campaign
- Other work: New Hampshire Provincial Congress delegate

Abraham Drake (December 4, 1715 – August 1, 1781) was an officer in the New Hampshire militia who served with the Continental Army during the American Revolutionary War.

== Biography ==
Drake was born in Hampton, New Hampshire to Abraham Drake and his wife, Theodate Roby. Abraham Drake married Abigail Weare, the sister of future New Hampshire "president" Meshech Weare, on January 13, 1738. They had two children before her death in 1740. On November 25, 1742, Abraham Drake remarried to Abigail Dearborn and together they would have thirteen children.

During the French and Indian War, he served as a lieutenant and, later, as a captain in the Dragoon company of Major Thomas Tash battalion of the New Hampshire Provincial Regiment.

With the start of the American Revolutionary War in 1775 and 1776, Abraham Drake was Lt. Col. in Jonathan Moulton's 3rd New Hampshire Militia Regiment that guarded the New Hampshire seacoast from British attack. In 1777, he was promoted to colonel of the 2nd New Hampshire Militia Regiment and commanded them during the Saratoga Campaign, serving in Ebenezer Learned's brigade.

Later, he served as a delegate to the New Hampshire Provincial Congress. Col. Abraham Drake died on August 1, 1781.
