= Moffatt-Ladd House =

Historic house in New Hampshire, United States

- U.S. National Register of Historic Places
- U.S. National Historic Landmark
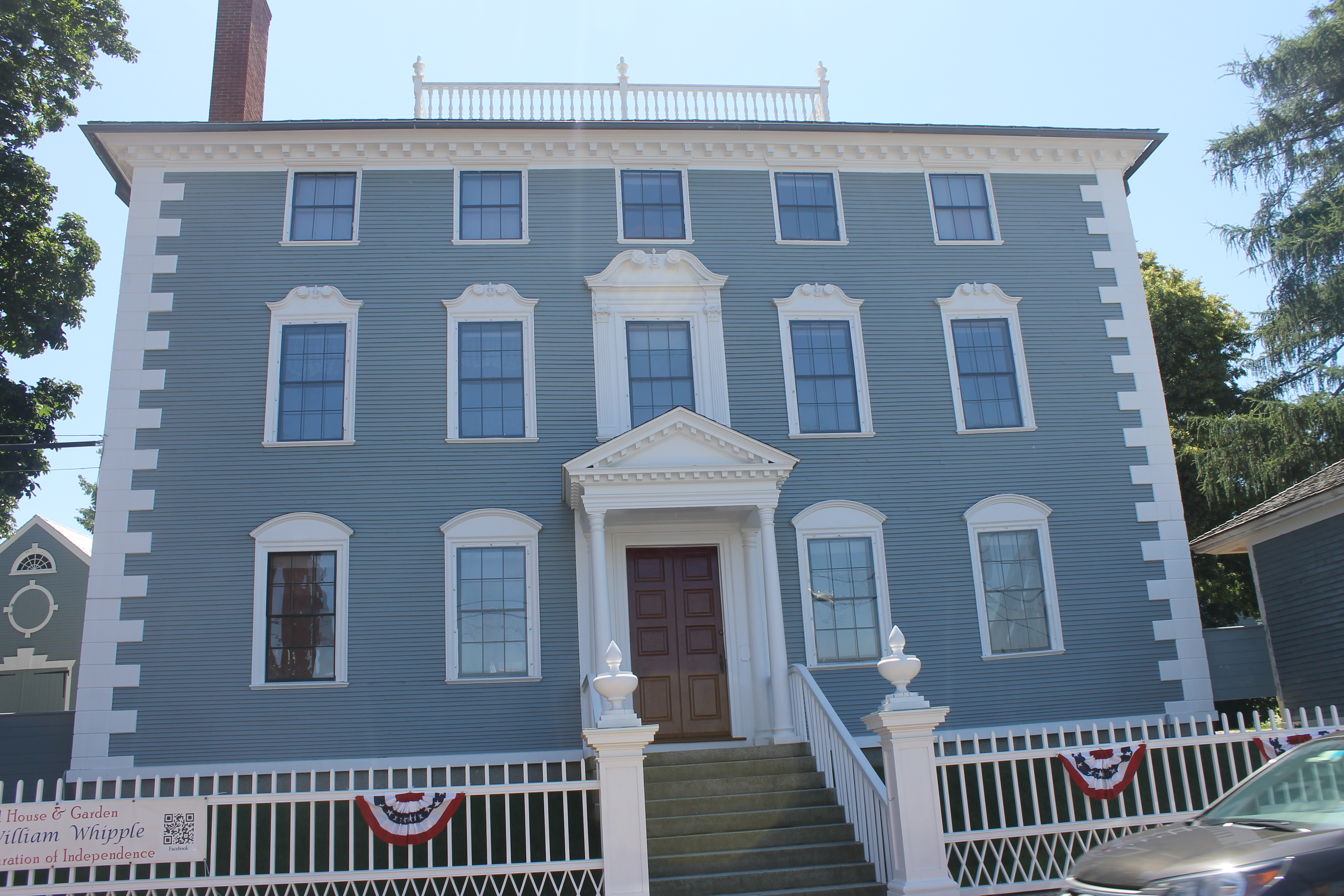
- The Moffatt-Ladd House in 2014

- Location within New Hampshire Location within the United States
- Location: 154 Market Street, Portsmouth, New Hampshire
- Coordinates: 43°4′43.91″N 70°45′32.17″W
- Built: 1763
- Architectural style: Georgian
- NRHP reference No.: 68000010

Significant dates
- Added to NRHP: November 24, 1968
- Designated NHL: November 24, 1968

The Moffatt-Ladd House, also known as the William Whipple House, is a historic house museum and National Historic Landmark in Portsmouth, New Hampshire, United States. The 1763 Georgian house was the home of William Whipple (1730–1785), a Founding Father, a signer of the Declaration of Independence and Revolutionary War general. The house is now owned by the National Society of Colonial Dames in New Hampshire, and is open to the public.

Among the contents are Whipple's sword and other personal items, along with a portrait of him. Outside is a horse chestnut tree that Whipple planted in 1776 with seeds that he brought back from Philadelphia. The house was declared a National Historic Landmark in 1968.

== Description ==
The house is an imposing three-story wood-frame structure, set on a rise overlooking the old part of Portsmouth Harbor. It is roughly square, measuring about 42 feet (13 m) on each side, with a hip roof. The exterior is covered in wood clapboards, with wooden quoins at the corners. There are three chimneys, located at the sides of the house. The main facade is five bays wide; its windows on the first two levels are topped by segmented arch pediments, while the third-level windows, which are smaller, butt against the roof cornice in Federal style. The roof topped by a flat widow's walk surrounded by a low balustrade with urn finials. The urn finials also appear on the fence that sets the house off from the street. The property includes a small office building dating to 1810.

== History ==
The house was built in 1763 by John Moffatt, one of the wealthiest men in colonial New Hampshire, and given to his son Samuel as a wedding present the following year. The elder Moffatt repurchased the house from his son in 1768, and lived there with his daughter Catherine and her husband, William Whipple, until his death in 1785. Whipple's slaves, Prince Whipple and Windsor Moffatt, also lived in the house.

The property was entailed by Moffatt to Samuel's descendants, who acquired control of the property after legal disputes in 1818. The house passed the following year to Maria Tufton Haven Ladd, one of Samuel's granddaughters.

Maria Ladd's son Alexander Hamilton Ladd occupied the house until his death in 1900, and was responsible for establishing the property's fine gardens. His children donated the house to the National Society of Colonial Dames in New Hampshire in 1911.

The house was declared a National Historic Landmark in 1968, and listed on the National Register of Historic Places.

== Gallery ==
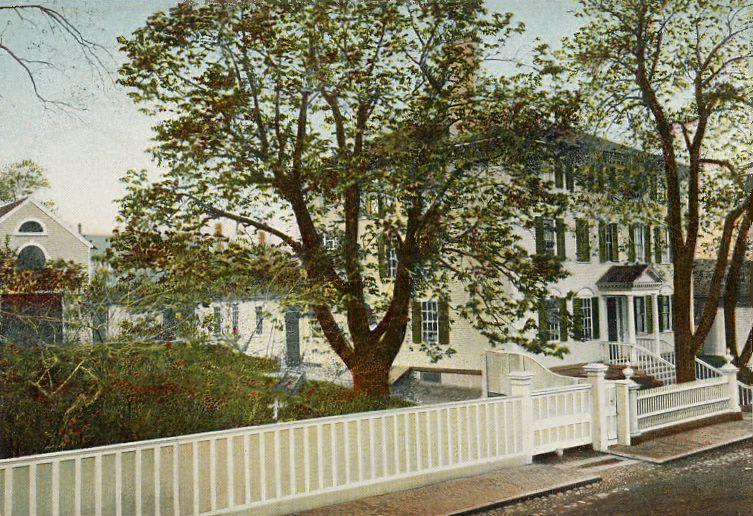
1905 photo of the Moffatt-Ladd House

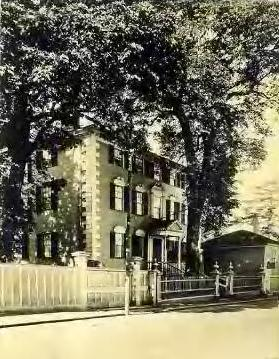
1915 postcard

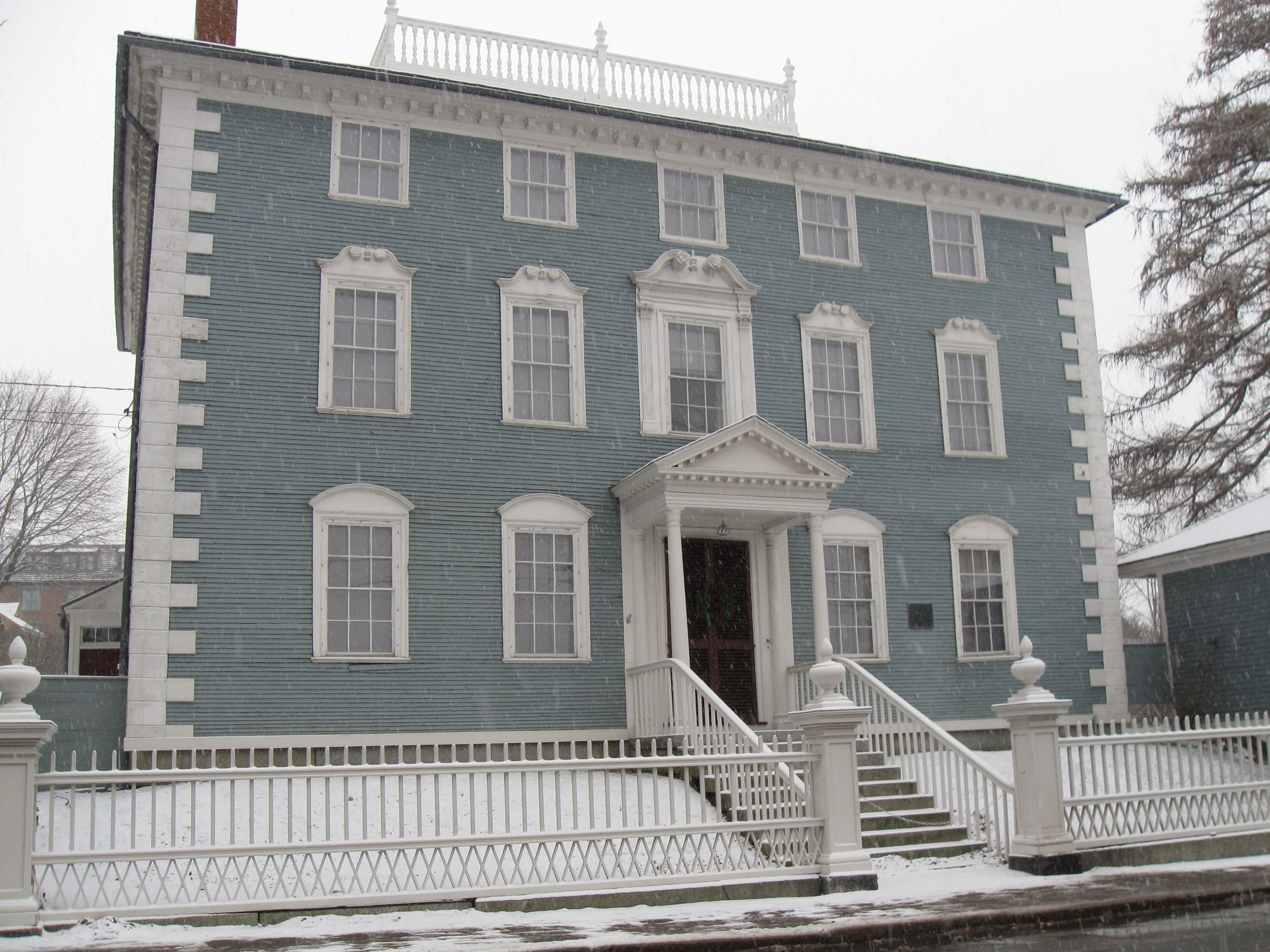
Moffatt-Ladd House in 2009

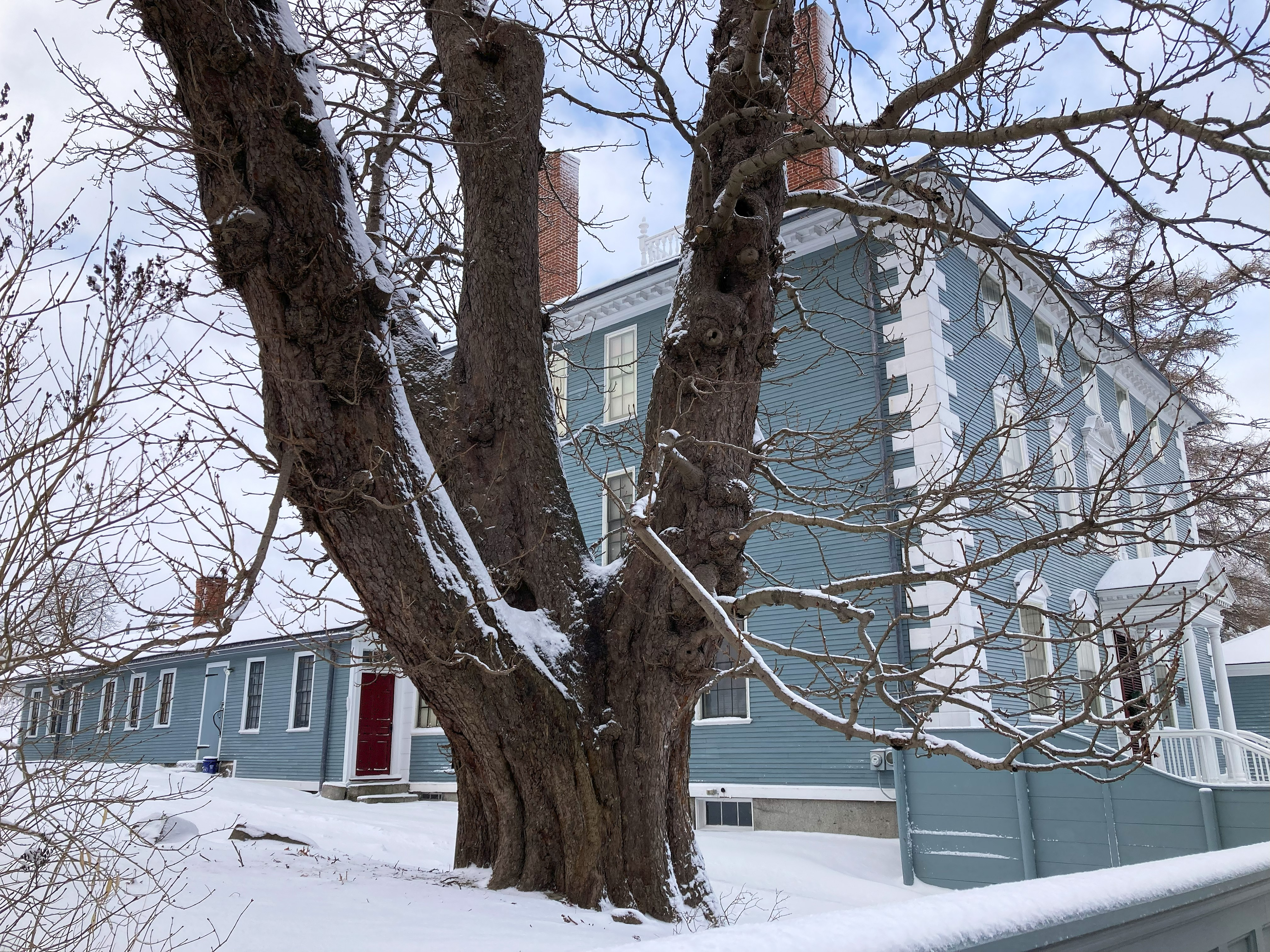
Horse chestnut tree next to the house

== See also ==
- List of National Historic Landmarks in New Hampshire
- National Register of Historic Places listings in Rockingham County, New Hampshire
