= Prince Whipple =

American slave and Revolutionary War veteran (1750–1796)

- Born: c. 1750; Anomabu, Gold Coast
- Died: 1796 (aged 45–46); Portsmouth, New Hampshire, US
- Resting place: Old North Cemetery, Portsmouth, New Hampshire
- Occupations: Soldier, Bodyguard
- Known for: American Revolutionary War Washington Crossing the Delaware
- Spouse: Dinah Whipple
- Military career
- Allegiance: United States
- Branch: Continental Army: New Hampshire Militia
- Conflicts: American Revolutionary War

Prince Whipple (c. 1750 – 1796) was an African American slave and later freedman. He was a soldier and a bodyguard during the American Revolution under his slaveowner General William Whipple of the New Hampshire Militia who formally manumitted him in 1784. Prince is depicted in Emanuel Leutze's painting Washington Crossing the Delaware and Thomas Sully's painting Passage of the Delaware.

== Early life ==
In his 1855 book Colored Patriots of the American Revolution, the nineteenth-century African-American author and abolitionist William Cooper Nell related some undocumented anecdotes about Whipple and his life:

Prince Whipple was born in Ambou [sic], Africa, of comparatively wealthy parents. When about ten years of age, he was sent by them, in company with a cousin, to America to be educated. An elder brother had returned four years before, and his parents were anxious that their child should receive the same benefits. The captain who brought the two boys over proved to be a treacherous villain, and carried them to Baltimore, where he exposed them for sale, they were both purchased by Portsmouth, New Hampshire men, Prince falling to General William Whipple. He was emancipated during the [Revolutionary] War, was much esteemed, and was once entrusted by the General with a large sum of money to carry from Salem to Portsmouth. He was attacked on the road, near Newburyport, by two ruffians; one was struck with a loaded whip, the other one he shot ... Prince was beloved by all who knew him. He was also known as "Caleb Quotom" of Portsmouth, where he died leaving a widow, Dinah, a freeperson and two children.

Prince and his brother Cuffee were sent by their parents to study in America. During the journey, they were kidnapped by a slave trader and sent to a prison in the Caribbean. Prince, his brother, and hundreds of other slaves at the prison were sold to a sea captain. A majority of the prisoners were sent to sugar and tobacco plantations in the West Indies and the Southern British Colonies. Prince and Cuffee were not among those sold in the plantations, but instead were sent to Portsmouth, New Hampshire to be house slaves. There they were purchased by William Whipple Jr. who was a successful businessman and owner of the slave ship that purchased the slaves from the prison.

Prince was well liked in Portsmouth. As William Nell stated "He was also known as 'Caleb Quotom" of Portsmouth'" and got along well with the other slaves. Prince joined William as a servant in large weddings, dinners, balls, and parties held by the White population of New Hampshire and was well received.

== American Revolution ==
When the Revolution started, William Whipple was assigned as a captain in the Continental Army and took Prince with him. Initially, Prince served as a bodyguard to William because of military regulations that forbid Blacks from serving in the army or militia. Despite the restrictions, Blacks had been reported to have fought alongside the colonists in many battles including Lexington and Bunker Hill. The British offered freedom to American slaves if they were to serve in the British Army against the American Colonies. In 1780, the Southern Colonies began to draft free Blacks and a select number of enslaved men for military service as a response to the actions of the British. The conscription of Blacks was also an answer to the diminishing manpower of the Thirteen Colonies. The increased need of men allowed Prince to serve as a military aide to William and a soldier in the New Hampshire Militia.

=== Service under William Whipple ===
In 1777, William was promoted to brigadier general and was ordered to go to Vermont. Prince joined him, but challenged his position as a slave. Prince argued with William saying "You are going to fight for your Liberty, but I have none to fight for." William offered Prince his freedom if he continued his military service. Prince agreed and by the end of the war, William ended Prince's servitude and granted his freedom. According to the Portsmouth, New Hampshire Town Records, General Whipple granted Prince the rights of a freeman on February 22, 1781, Prince's wedding day. He was legally manumitted by Gen. William Whipple on February 26, 1784.

=== Freedom Petition ===
In 1779 Prince joined with nineteen other freed slaves who referred themselves as the "Natives of Africa" in Portsmouth. These men went to the House and Council sitting of New Hampshire and petitioned for their freedom to be kept. They stated the following:

God of Nature gave them Life and Freedom, upon the Terms of the most perfect Equality with other men, That Freedom is an inherent right of the human Species, not to be surrendered, but by Consent, for the Sake of social Life; that private or public Tyranny and Slavery, are alike detestable to Minds conscious of the equal Dignity of human Nature …

Their plea for freedom was made public in the New Hampshire Gazette. Although Prince was not a freedman at the time of the signing of the petition, he was an advocate for the protection of freedmen rights and liberties. the petition was tabled. In March 2013 the New Hampshire Senate passed the Bill; in April 2013 the New Hampshire House passed the Bill

=== After the War ===
Prince returned to Portsmouth as a freedman and reunited with his brother Cuffee. He married a woman named Dinah who was a slave in New Castle and was granted freedman status by her enslaver at age 21. For his service in the war, Prince was given a small plot of land upon which he, his brother, and his wife built a house. They converted the house into the Ladies Charitable African School to teach young children. Dinah taught there until her death.

== Death and legacy ==
Prince died in 1796, and is buried (as is his former owner, William Whipple) in Portsmouth's historic Old North Cemetery. At least two artists acknowledged Prince's patriotic service during the Revolution under Commander George Washington and William Whipple in two noteworthy art pieces.

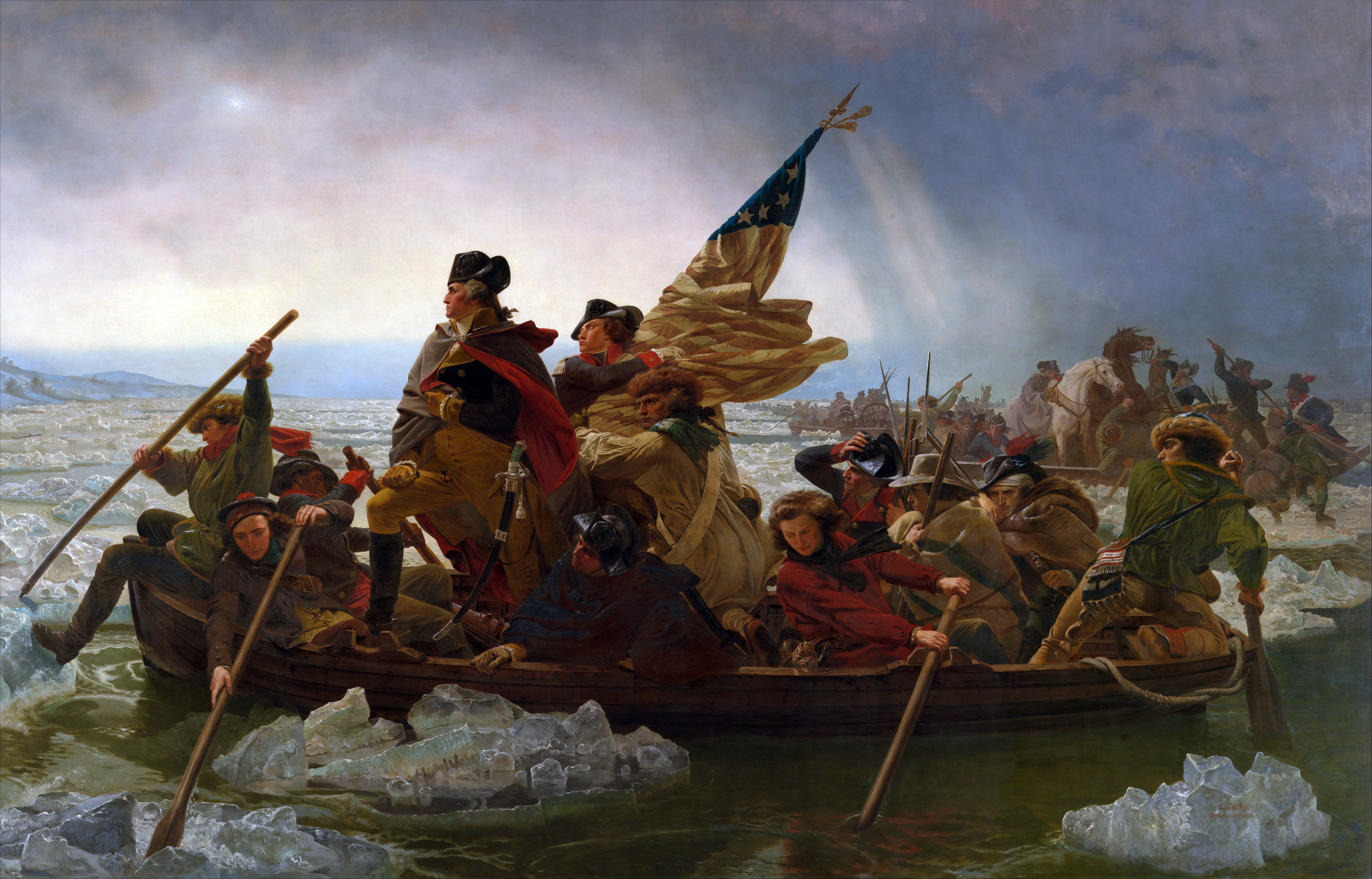
The Crossing of the Delaware, Prince Whipple may be depicted near George Washington in the lower left corner, or the bow, of the boat.

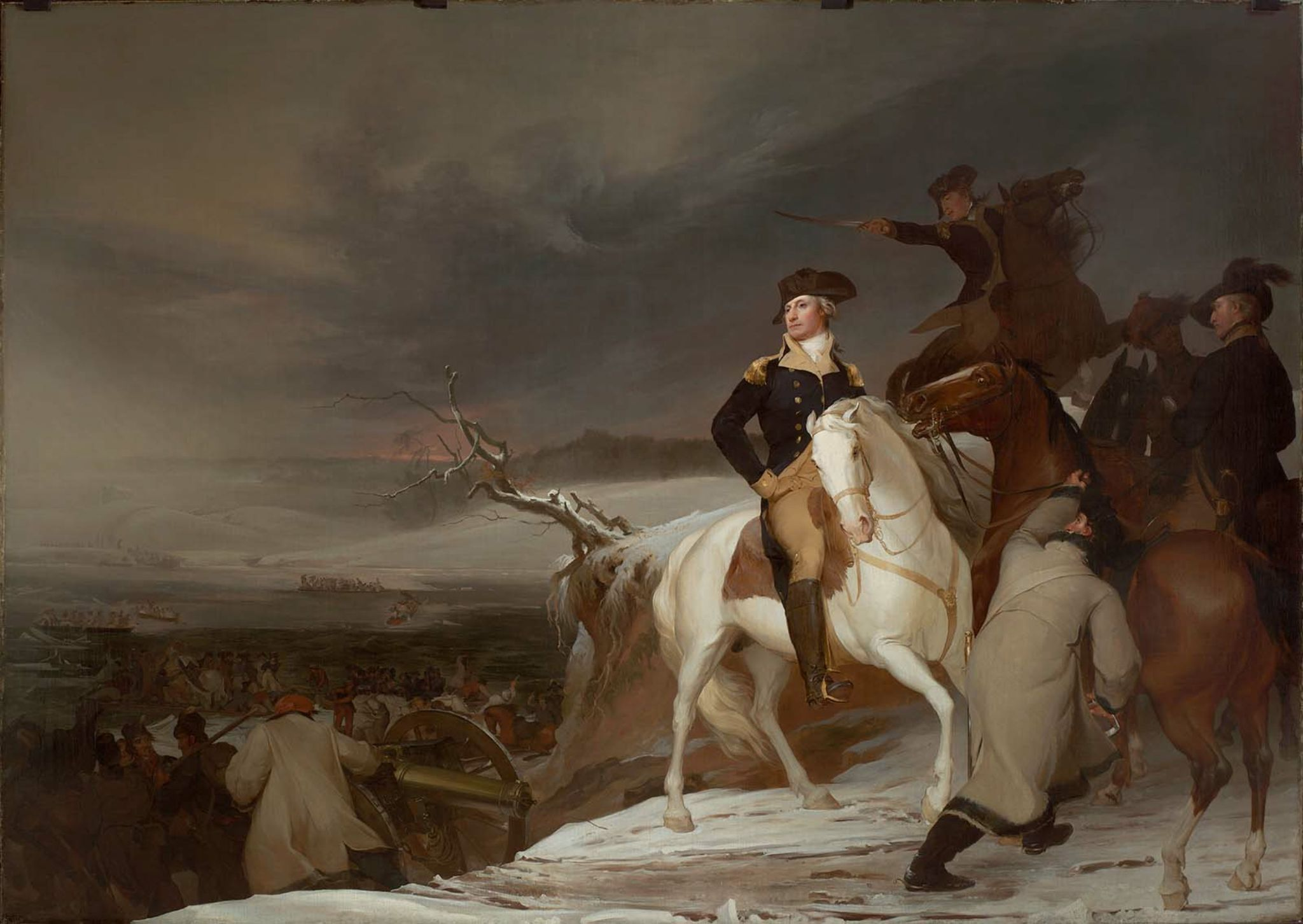
The Passage of the Delaware, 1819. Prince Whipple can be seen to the far right side of the painting dressed in red.

According to legend, Prince Whipple accompanied General Whipple and George Washington in the famous crossing of the Delaware River and is the black man portrayed fending off ice with an oar at Washington's knee in the painting Washington Crossing the Delaware, painted 75 years after the event by German American artist Emanuel Leutze. Most historians doubt that there is any basis for this story. It is extremely unlikely that either General Whipple or Prince Whipple was present at the Battle of Trenton. At that time, General Whipple was serving in the Continental Congress, which had fled Philadelphia and reconvened in Baltimore, a distance of 135 miles (217 km) from Trenton. Moreover, Prince Whipple was not famous at the time the painting was commissioned, and it is unlikely that Leutze would have heard of him.

In 1819, American painter Thomas Sully created his interpretation of the Battle of Trenton. The painting depicts Washington on a white horse around three white officers and a Black man. The Black soldier in the painting is shown wearing red clothing speaking to an officer. The man in this picture is confirmed to be Prince Whipple as Sully had heard about Prince and incorporated him into his painting. Much like the Leutze painting, Prince was most likely not present at Trenton during Washington's crossing.

== Bibliography ==
- Benton, B. (1973). "Prince Whipple, Soldier of the American Revolution". Negro History Bulletin. 36 (4): 126–127. JSTOR 44175565.
- Buckley, Gail (2001). American Patriots: The Story of Blacks in the Military From the Revolution to Desert Storm. New York, NY: Random House Inc. ISBN 0-375-76009-1.
- Horton, James Oliver; Horton, Lois E. (1997). In Hope of Liberty: Culture, Community, and Protest Among Northern Free Blacks 1700-1860. New York, NY: Oxford University Press. ISBN 0-19-512465-0.
- Kaplan, Sidney; Kaplan, Emma Nogrady (1975). The Black Presence in the Era of the American Revolution 1770–1800. Amherst: The University of Massachusetts Press. ISBN 0-87023-662-8.
- Nell, William Cooper (1855). The Colored Patriots of the American Revolution. Boston, MA: J.B. Yerrinton & Son, Printers.
- Robinson, J. Dennis. "Prince Whipple and American Painting", from SeacoastNH.com.
- Walling, Richard S. (December 2001). "Prince Whipple: Symbol of African Americans at the Battle of Trenton". Archived from the original on 2002-08-18.
- Afro-American History thru Art page
- Lives of the Signers to the Declaration of Independence. By Rev. Charles A. goodrich, published by William Reed & Co. New York 1829
