= Jonathan Moulton =

- Born: July 21, 1726; Hampton, New Hampshire
- Died: September 18, 1787 (aged 61) Hampton, New Hampshire
- Buried: unknown
- Allegiance: Thirteen Colonies; United Colonies; United States
- Rank: Colonel (1771); Brigadier general (1785)
- Commands: 3rd Regiment of NH Militia; 1st Brigade of the NH Militia
- Memorials: Pine Grove Cemetery, Hampton

Brigadier General Jonathan Moulton (/ˈmoʊltən/; July 21, 1726 – September 18, 1787) played an important role in the early history of New Hampshire and many tales of his adventures would become legendary. He is the namesake of the town of Moultonborough in Carroll County, New Hampshire.

== Early colonial life and King George's War ==
Jonathan Moulton was born in the town of North Hampton. He spent much of his childhood as an apprentice (indentured servant) to a cabinetmaker. In 1745, he won his freedom and left the cabinet making trade. He worked as a silversmith and formed the Moulton and Towle Silversmithing Company. He ended up leaving the silversmithing trade to his partner and the company is still called Towle Silversmithing Company today, where it still manufactures silverware and kitchen utensils.

He was appointed as a captain of a ranger company in the New Hampshire Militia. In the same year, he was with the New England army under the command of William Pepperrell that took Fortress Louisbourg from the French. For the rest of King George's War, Moulton fought against the Ossipee Indians that were allied to the French around Lake Winnipesaukee until they were killed or driven to Canada. During one winter scout from Dover, New Hampshire, Capt. Moulton and his men ambushed six Ossipee warriors on the ice of Lake Winniepesaukee. Five of the warriors were killed in the first volley and the sixth ran away, followed closely by Moulton's massive black dog that attacked and killed the fleeing warrior. The Treaty of Aix-la-Chapelle ended the war in 1748. It would be only six years until the next war between Britain and France.

After the end of the war in 1749, Moulton married Abigail Smith. Together they had eleven children. Also during this time, Moulton opened a store in Hampton and started importing goods from Europe and the West Indies.

== French and Indian War until the American Revolution ==
With the resumption of the colonial struggle in 1754 with the French and Indian War, Moulton once again served as a captain in the New Hampshire Militia and was elected to the New Hampshire General Court.

After the end of the French and Indian War, Moulton was granted large tracts of land on the north side of Lake Winnipesaukee in the towns of Moultonborough (named after himself), New Hampton, Tamworth, Center Harbor and Sandwich, by the governors Benning Wentworth and John Wentworth.

In 1764, with the wreck of the mast-ship St. George off the coast of Hampton, Moulton and many of the other town residents salvaged many of the goods aboard for their own profit.

In the early morning hours of March 15, 1769, Moulton's mansion burned to the ground. This fire helped to start one of the most interesting legends about him as the "Yankee Faust".

== The American Revolution ==
During the events that led up to the American Revolution, Moulton was elected as moderator of the Hampton town meetings, chosen as a member of the Committee of Safety, appointed as a delegate to the patriot assembly at Exeter, New Hampshire, and commissioned as the Colonel of the 3rd New Hampshire Regiment of Militia.

On September 21, 1775, his wife Abigail died of smallpox. A year later, he married Sarah Emery, with whom he fathered four more children.

For the first two years of the American Revolutionary War, Col. Moulton's regiment guarded the 18-mile seacoast of New Hampshire against British invasion. But in the fall of 1777, he marched with his men to the Battle of Saratoga in New York and the defeat of Lt. General John Burgoyne's British army invading from Canada. Col. Moulton and the 3rd New Hampshire Militia served in Gen. John Stark's brigade during the battle. He was promoted to Brigadier General by George Washington who was impressed with his battlefield skills.

== Post-war ==
After the end of the American Revolution, Moulton continued his role in the New Hampshire militia. On March 25, 1785, he was created Brigadier General of the 1st Brigade of the New Hampshire Militia.

Moulton was rewarded lands (for his successes during the war) in the lakes region of New Hampshire and founded the town of Moultonborough. He settled in North Hampton, New Hampshire and was one of the first people to paint his house colonial white. This was not a popular decision with some of the local townspeople since paint had to be imported from Britain.

Moulton participated in a feud over farm land with a neighbor which was exacerbated by a series of slanderous editorials written in The Boston Post, Boston's major newspaper at the time. The feud became part of a civil suit in which the judge, a long time friend of the general, ruled in his favor. Mysteriously, the Moulton's barn was burned down and no one ever claimed responsibility. He expressed that he was more upset about losing the animals than losing the barn itself, which could be re-built.

He died at the age of 61 on September 18, 1787. His body was moved in the middle of the night before burial and his tombstone disappeared. Two years later, in 1789, George Washington stopped and paid his respects to General Moulton's widow Sarah on his tour of the new United States of America.

== Supernatural legends ==
During his life, Moulton was a controversial figure in the Province of New Hampshire and later the state.

=== The Yankee Faust ===
In the first legend, in which his house burns down, it was said that he had made a deal with the Devil and had outsmarted him by saying that he would sell his soul to the devil if the devil would fill his boots up with gold coins on the first of every month. Jonathan found the largest set of boots in all of the Province of New Hampshire. The next month the devil returned to fill up the boots with gold, but no matter how many gold coins he poured in the boots they would not fill. Moulton had cut off the soles of the boots and put the boots over a hole in the floor and all the gold coins fell into the basement of the house. The devil, after being outsmarted by Moulton, burned down his house in revenge. The gold coins disappeared.

=== The New Wife and The Old, written by John Greenleaf Whittier ===
In the second tale, the ghost of Moulton's first wife Abigail appears on his wedding night and takes the ring off the finger of his new wife Sarah as the two are in bed together.

In a final legendary story, a pallbearer at Moulton's funeral opened his coffin to find it empty, replaced by a box of gold coins with the devil stamped on them. Jonathan Moulton was in fact buried without a tombstone and the site of his grave is now unknown.

== See also ==
- John Goffe
- John Lovewell
- John Greenleaf Whittier
