= Dinah Whipple =

Black teacher in New Hampshire (c.1760–1846)

- Born: Dinah Chase c. 1760; New Castle, New Hampshire
- Died: February 13, 1846 (aged 85–86); Portsmouth, New Hampshire
- Known for: Community leadership and education
- Spouse: Prince Whipple
- Children: 7

Dinah Chase Whipple (c. 1760- February 13, 1846) was an emancipated slave who was a leader in Portsmouth, New Hampshire's free Black community. She created New Hampshire's first school for Black children.

== Biography ==
Dinah Whipple was born around 1760 into slavery. She was enslaved by Congregationalist minister Reverend Chase of New Castle, New Hampshire. She moved with him to Hampton, New Hampshire, during the Revolutionary War. Dinah Chase worked as a house servant. While there, she studied religion with Reverend Dr. Thayer. Whipple and her whole family were baptized in the Congregational Church. She was able to read and write, which was uncommon amongst women in the area at the time.

On February 22, 1781, when she was freed by her owner, she moved to Portsmouth and married Prince Whipple, a former soldier in the Revolutionary War. They lived with the Whipples for several more years, possibly as paid servants. They had seven children together. One of their children died in 1791.

Four years after marrying, Prince and Dinah moved with Prince's brother and sister-in-law, Cuffee and Rebecca Whipple, to a house on High Street. Around 1806, Dinah opened a school, likely in their house, the Ladies Charitable African School. The kind of school that it was is unclear. The school operated until 1832.

In 1796, Prince Whipple died. Dinah Whipple continued to work, including taking in work from the church, but was unable to support herself entirely. Beginning in 1825, she received charitable assistance from Portsmouth's North Church. In 1832, Whipple was forced from her house on High Street due to its deteriorating condition. As the wife of Prince's former enslaver died in that year as well, her heirs gave Dinah the use of a house on Pleasant Street and a small annuity. Dinah lived there for fourteen years, sometimes with her grown children.

Whipple died on February 13, 1846. North Church gave a gift to her daughter and paid for her funeral. Whipple was probably buried in Portsmouth's Old North Cemetery with her husband, though there is no marker. Uncommon for a Black person at the time, Whipple was eulogized in the Portsmouth Journal of Literature and Politics, which noted, "Few, of any color, have lived a more upright, virtuous, and truly Christian life … enjoyed a more calm, tranquil and happy old age, and few have had a more peaceful and happy death."

The University of New Hampshire's Dinah Whipple STEAM Academy, "an immersive educational program that explores science, technology, engineering, the arts and mathematics (STEAM), as well as the Black experience," is named in Whipple's honor.
