= Moore's Regiment of Militia =

- Active: 1777
- Allegiance: State of New Hampshire
- Type: Infantry
- Part of: New Hampshire Militia
- Engagements: Bemis Heights

Commanders
- Notable commanders: John Goffe

Moore's Regiment of Militia also known as the 9th New Hampshire Militia Regiment was called up at Lyndeborough, New Hampshire, on September 29, 1777, as reinforcements for the Continental Army during the Saratoga Campaign. The regiment marched quickly to join the gathering forces of General Horatio Gates as he faced British General John Burgoyne in northern New York. The regiment served in General William Whipple's brigade of New Hampshire militia. With the surrendered of Burgoyne's Army on October 17 the regiment was disbanded on October 27, 1777. General John Stark gave to the regiment a brass four-pounder cannon captured at the Battle of Bennington, known as "Old Molly".

Before the American Revolutionary War, the 9th had been commanded by Colonel John Goffe who had led the New Hampshire Provincial Regiment during the French and Indian War.
