= Bellow's Regiment of Militia =

- Active: 1777
- Allegiance: State of New Hampshire
- Type: Infantry
- Part of: New Hampshire Militia
- Engagements: Bemis Heights

Commanders
- Notable commanders: Benjamin Bellow

Bellow's Regiment of Militia also known as the 16th New Hampshire Militia Regiment was called up at Walpole, New Hampshire, on September 21, 1777, as reinforcements for the Continental Army during the Saratoga Campaign. The regiment marched quickly to join the gathering forces of Gen. Horatio Gates as he faced British Gen. John Burgoyne in northern New York. The regiment served in Gen. William Whipple's brigade of New Hampshire militia. With the surrender of Burgoyne's Army on October 17 the regiment was disbanded on October 27, 1777.
