= Old North Cemetery (Portsmouth, New Hampshire) =

- U.S. National Register of Historic Places
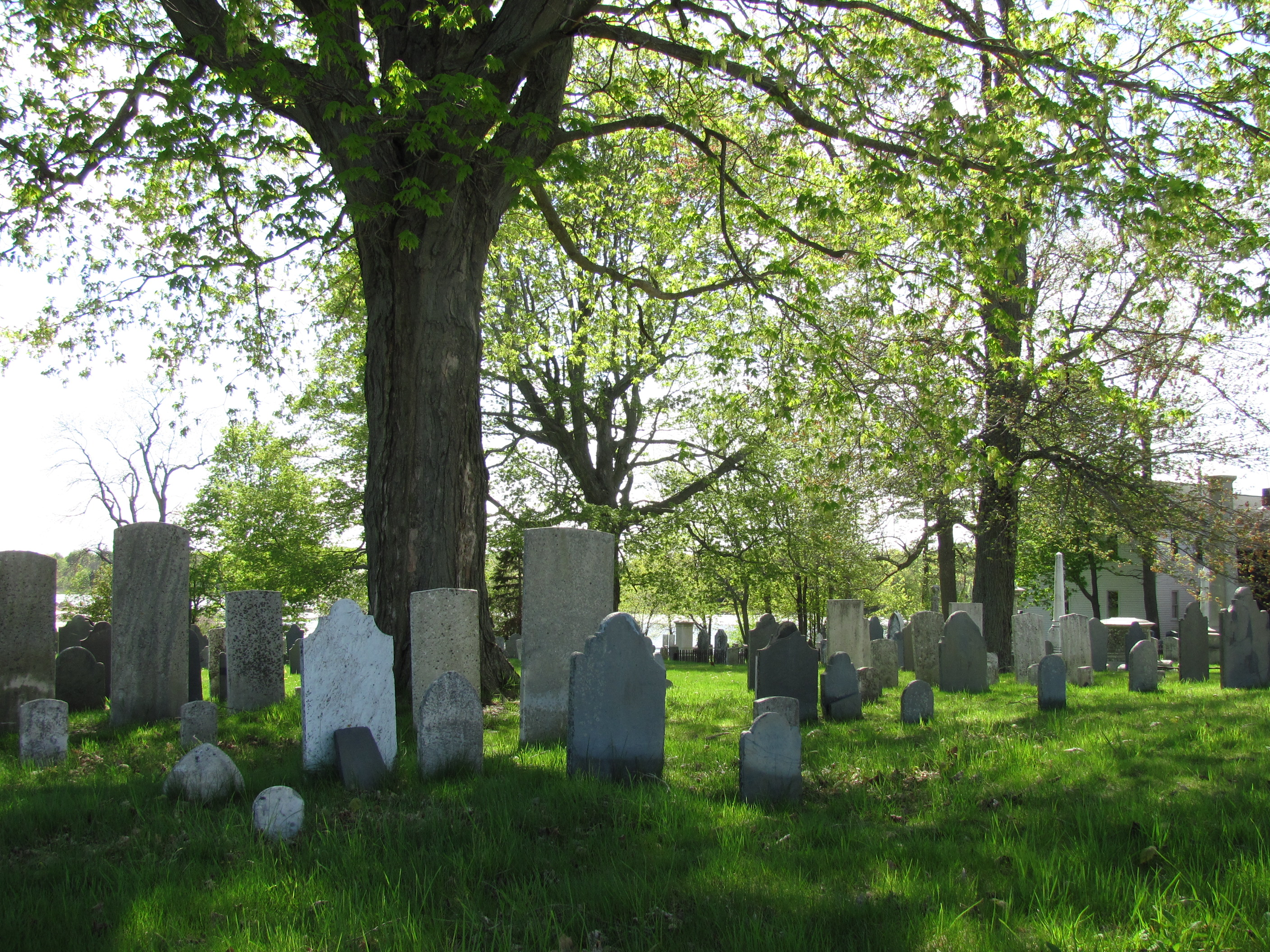
- Old North Cemetery

- Location within New Hampshire Location within the United States
- Location: Maplewood Ave., Portsmouth, New Hampshire
- Coordinates: 43°4′41″N 70°45′48″W
- Area: 1.5 acres (0.61 ha)
- Built: 1751
- NRHP reference No.: 78000218
- Added to NRHP: March 08, 1978

Old North Cemetery is a historic cemetery on Maplewood Avenue in Portsmouth, New Hampshire. It is a roughly 1.5-acre (0.61 ha) parcel of land north of the city center on the shore of North Mill Pond. Its earliest burials are dated to 1751, although it was not formally established as a cemetery until 1753. It is the largest of the city's 18th century cemeteries, and is remarkable for the relatively distant locations some of the stonecarvers came from whose work appears in it. The cemetery was listed on the National Register of Historic Places in 1978.

== Setting ==
Old North Cemetery is located north of downtown Portsmouth, on the southwest side of Maplewood Avenue. It is bounded on the southeast by a railroad yard, and the northwest by Union Cemetery. To the west it borders a portion of the North Mill Pond. This setting is in stark contrast to its historical surroundings. At the time of its founding, it was essentially laid out on a peninsula, and the pond was more of a tidal inlet of the Piscataqua River. Its present surroundings are the result of intensive development and redevelopment in the 19th and 20th centuries.

== Description ==
The cemetery is in a nearly rectangular irregular shape, about 1.5 acres (0.61 ha) in size. The land slopes down toward the water, and has a number of hillocks, most of which are topped by graves. It is separated from Union Cemetery by a row of trees, and from the railroad yard by a chain link fence. A low retaining wall separates it from Maplewood Avenue.

== History ==
The site was first used as a cemetery in 1751, and was formally acquired by the city in 1753. It was not its first cemetery, which was located near present-day Mechanic Street. It is the largest of those laid out in the 18th century, built to address increased demand in the growing community. It soon became a favored burying ground, and a number of locally and nationally prominent figures are interred there.

== Notable burials ==
- Ammi Ruhamah Cutter (1735–1820), Physician General of the Continental Army
- John Hart, colonial soldier
- John Langdon, governor of New Hampshire, one of the first two U.S. senators from the state and signer of the US Constitution
- Woodbury Langdon, merchant, delegate from New Hampshire to Continental Congress, New Hampshire Superior Court justice, brother of John Langdon
- John Pickering
- Edmund Roberts, United States diplomat
- Dinah Whipple, leader in Portsmouth's free Black community
- Prince Whipple, emancipated enslaved person, freed by William Whipple in 1781
- William Whipple, signer of U.S. Declaration of Independence, brigadier general in New Hampshire Militia

== See also ==
- National Register of Historic Places listings in Rockingham County, New Hampshire
