= Battle of Rhode Island Site =

- U.S. National Register of Historic Places
- U.S. National Historic Landmark
- Patriot's Park, memorial off RI 114 to Rhode Island militiamen slain in battle

- Location within Rhode Island Location within the United States
- Location: Lehigh Hill and both sides of RI 24 between Hedley and Dexter Sts., Portsmouth, Rhode Island
- Area: 365 acres (148 ha) (main battlefield); 34 acres (14 ha) (Fort Butts and Butts Hill)
- Built: 1778
- NRHP reference No.: 74002054

Significant dates
- Added to NRHP: May 30, 1974
- Designated NHL: May 30, 1974

The Battle of Rhode Island Site is the partially preserved location of the Battle of Rhode Island, fought August 29, 1778 during the American Revolutionary War. The battle took place in the town of Portsmouth, Rhode Island, located on Aquidneck Island north of Newport, and was the only major action of the war that took place in Rhode Island. It was also significant as the only battle of the war in which an entirely segregated unit of African-American soldiers fought. At the time of the action, the 1st Rhode Island Regiment consisted of companies of locally recruited African Americans and Native Americans with white officers. The two main areas associated with the battle were designated a National Historic Landmark in 1974.

== History ==
In December 1776, a British force occupied Newport, Rhode Island. France decided to enter the war as an ally of the United States following the pivotal Battles of Saratoga in September and October 1777. The two militaries then sought to link together and attack British forces in North America. The first significant effort in this regard took place in July 1778, when a French fleet under Charles Henri Hector, Count of Estaing arrived off the east coast of North America. The ships originally were ordered to blockade Delaware Bay, but Estaing altered his target to New York City after learning that the British had evacuated the city of Philadelphia. However, he concluded that the bar at the mouth of New York Harbor was such that his largest ships could not safely enter. As a result, French and American military leaders decided to operate against the British at Newport.

American Continental Army forces were dispatched to Rhode Island, and militia were raised from surrounding states to assist in the effort. A storm arose at a critical moment when the French and British navies were about to engage, scattering both fleets. By this time, American forces led by Major General John Sullivan had already occupied the northern end of Aquidneck Island (called Rhode Island at the time). The French fleet withdrew on August 22 to Boston to repair, while Sullivan engaged in preliminary siege operations against Newport.

The French withdrawal prompted an exodus of militia from the American camp. News also arrived that a relief force was being organized by the British in New York, so Sullivan decided to withdraw from Aquidneck Island. Newport's British commander Major-general Robert Pigot led his forces out of Newport in pursuit and engaged the American forces on August 29 in the Battle of Rhode Island. The battle was tactically inconclusive in its outcome, though the Americans retreated from the island.

== Battlefield ==
The main area in which the battle was fought is a valley bounded by Lehigh Hill to the north and Turkey and Almy Hills to the south, an area of about 365 acres (148 ha). This area is sparsely populated today, and had few structures at the time of the battle. Turkey Hill was one of the major objectives of the British advance, and Lehigh Hill was one of the anchors of the American line. Barker Brook was an area that saw intense fighting, now largely obscured due to the construction of Rhode Island Route 24.

The second site of importance was Butts Hill which is located about 0.5 miles (0.80 km) northeast of the battle area. It was fortified with earthworks and served as a command post and fall-back defensive position for the Americans. Its earthworks are well defined and roughly 500 feet (150 m) by 250 feet (76 m) and are still in good condition.

== African-American participation ==
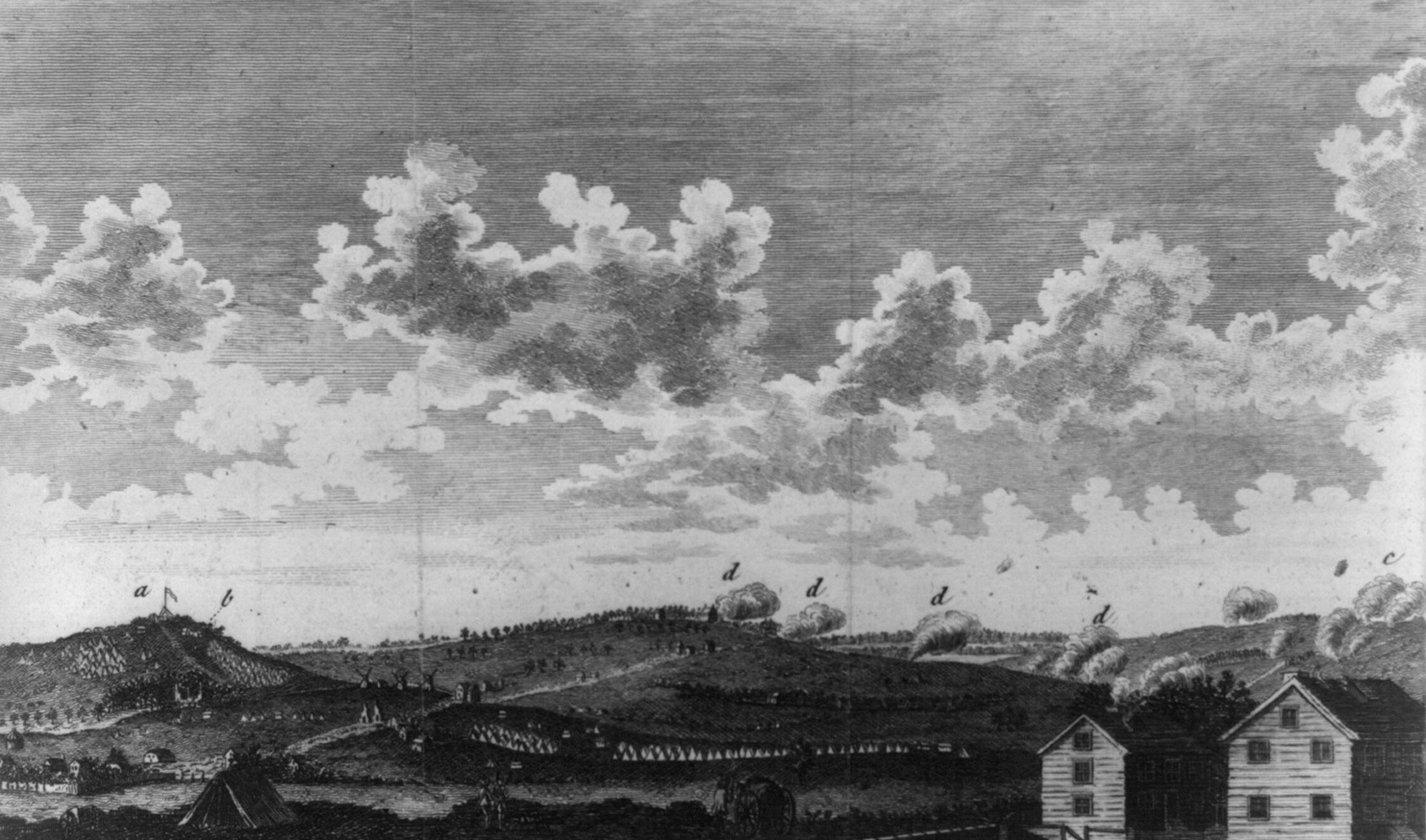
1779 print of the Battle of Rhode Island

The 1st Rhode Island Regiment was raised in early 1778 as a specifically African-American unit in order to help meet the state's obligations for manning the Continental Army. The unit joined Sullivan's force in Providence in July 1778 and participated in the occupation of Aquidneck Island. When the battle lines were drawn, the 1st Rhode Island was placed on Turkey Hill, the rightmost end of the American front line. Hessian troops made three separate assaults on Turkey Hill and were repulsed each time. The 1st Rhode Island suffered relatively light casualties with one killed and ten wounded, despite the severity of the action. This is attributed at least in part to the strong defensive position afforded by the hill.

The Rhode Island legislature repealed the act allowing African Americans to enlist in June 1778. The unit thereafter began to lose membership due to attrition and combat, which was compensated for by adding white recruits. Rhode Island's two regiments merged in January 1780, resulting in an integrated unit for the remainder of the war.

== Legacy ==
The battleground site and the fort at Butts Hill were declared National Historic Landmarks and listed on the National Register of Historic Places in 1974. The site includes two separate areas. The principal battle site is roughly centered at 41.596°N 71.263°W, and Butts Hill (41.615506°N 71.250815°W) is also preserved, one of the high points on Aquidneck Island.

== See also ==
- List of National Historic Landmarks in Rhode Island
- National Register of Historic Places listings in Newport County, Rhode Island

== Gallery ==
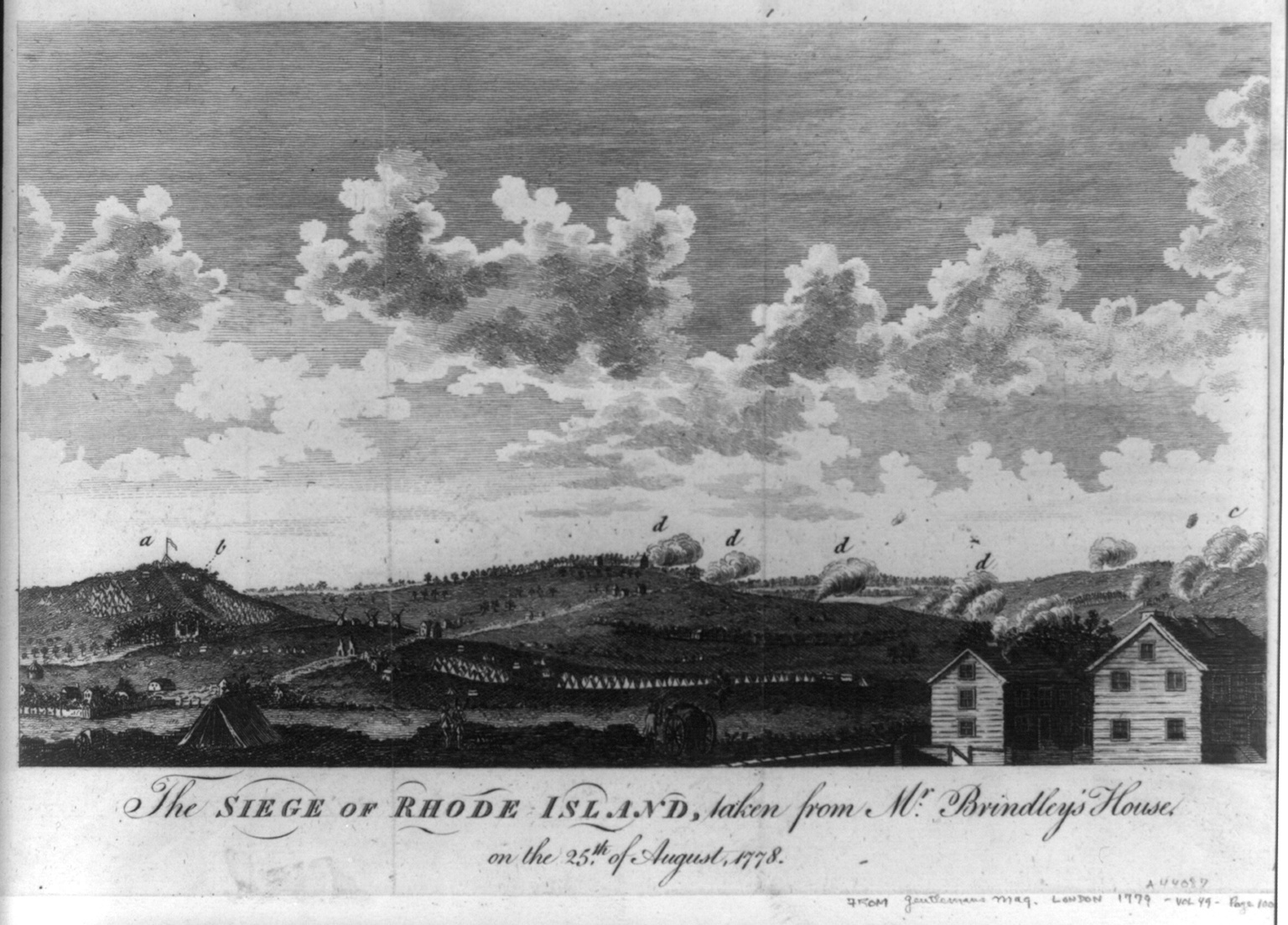
1779 print titled "The siege of Rhode Island, taken from Mr. Brindley's house on the 25th of August, 1778"

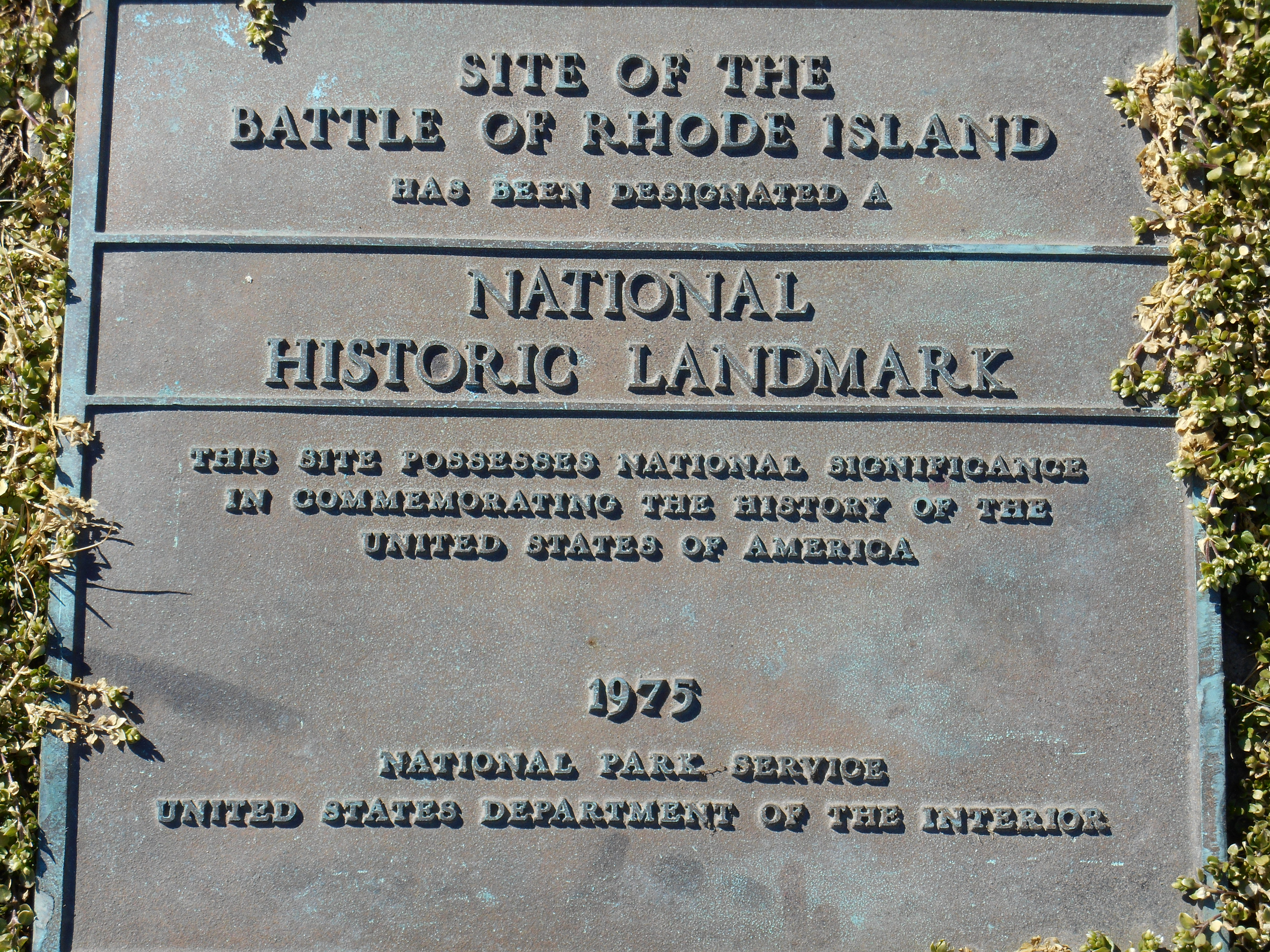
Battle of Rhode Island Site Plaque

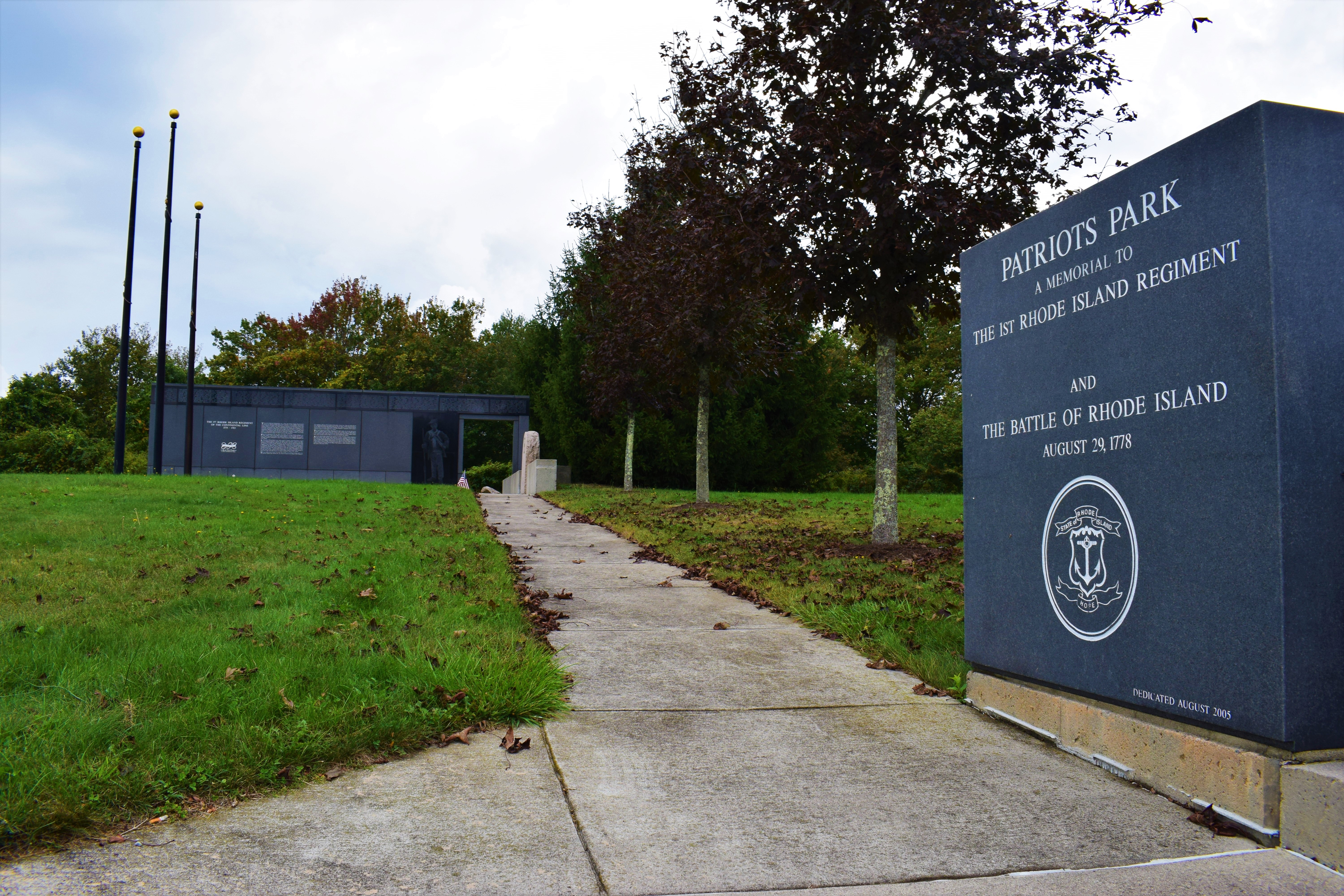
The Site of the Battle of Rhode Island

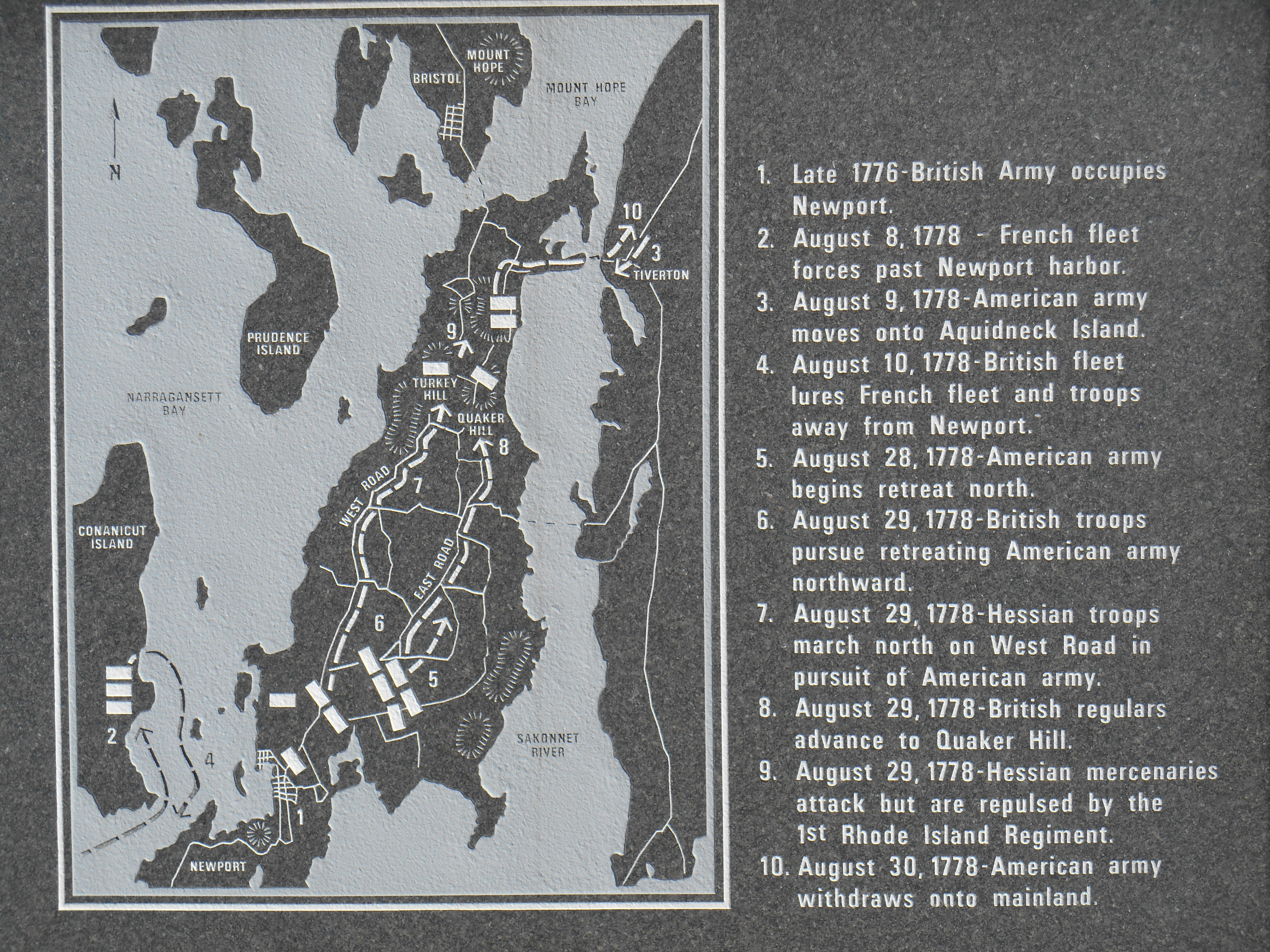
Map of Battle Site

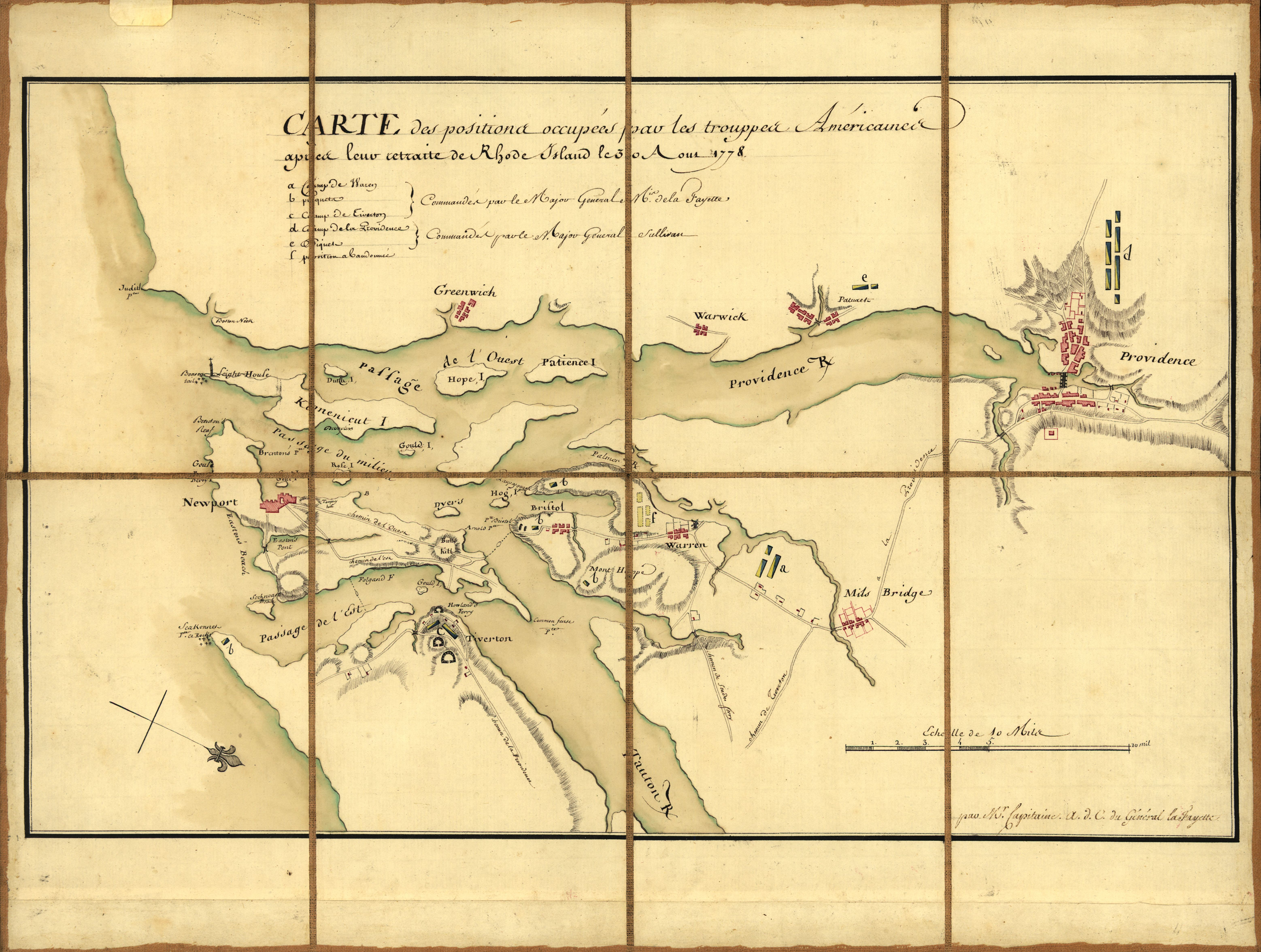
A French military map prepared for the Marquis de Lafayette showing American troop positions on August 30, 1778, after the Battle of Rhode Island

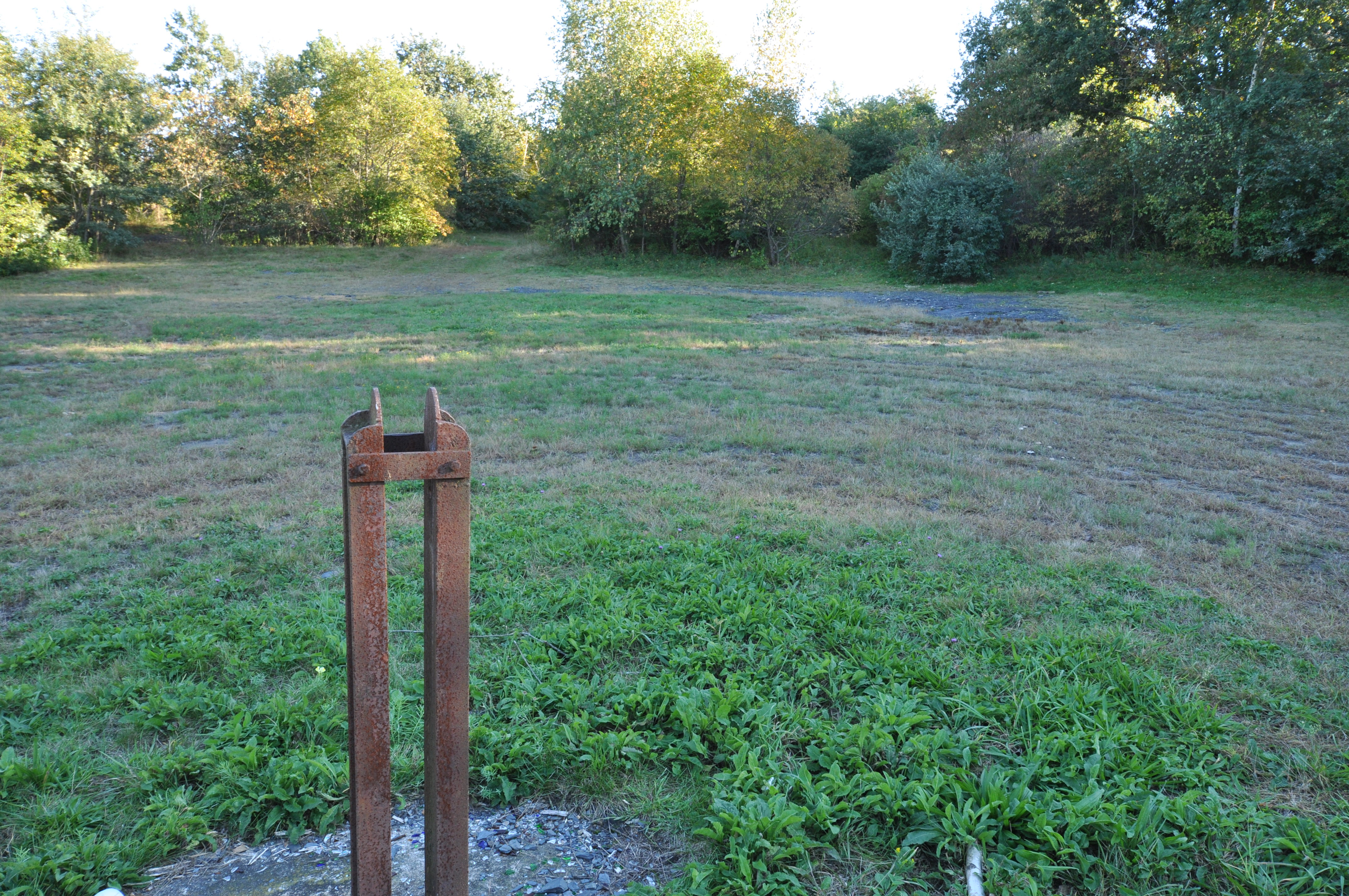
Center of the earthworks at Butts Hill

== Sources ==
- Daughan, George (2011) [2008]. If By Sea: The Forging of the American Navy—from the Revolution to the War of 1812. Basic Books. ISBN 978-0-465-02514-5. OCLC 701015376.
- Dearden, Paul F (1980). The Rhode Island Campaign of 1778. Providence, RI: Rhode Island Bicentennial Federation. ISBN 978-0-917012-17-4. OCLC 60041024.
- Morrissey, Brendan (2004). Monmouth Courthouse 1778: The Last Great Battle in the North. Oxford: Osprey Publishing. ISBN 978-1-84176-772-7. OCLC 56351768.
