= Chase's Regiment of Militia =

- Active: 1776-80
- Allegiance: State of New Hampshire
- Type: Infantry
- Part of: New Hampshire Militia
- Engagements: Bemis Heights

Commanders
- Notable commanders: Jonathan Chase

Chase's Regiment of Militia also known as the 13th New Hampshire Regiment of Militia was called up at Cornish, New Hampshire on September 22, 1777, as reinforcements for the Continental Army during the Saratoga Campaign. The regiment marched quickly to join the gathering forces of Gen. Horatio Gates as he faced British Gen. John Burgoyne in northern New York. The regiment served in Gen. William Whipple's brigade of New Hampshire militia. With the surrender of Burgoyne's Army on October 17 the regiment was disbanded on October 24, 1777. They would be called up again to protect the frontier of the state during the Royalton Raid of 1780.

== Sources ==
- The ranger service in the upper valley of the Connecticut, and the most northerly regiment of the New Hampshire militia in the period of the revolution : an address delivered before the New Hampshire Society of Sons of the American Revolution at Concord, N.H., April 26, 1900
- State Builders: An Illustrated Historical and Biographical Record of the State of New Hampshire. State Builders Publishing Manchester, NH 1903
