= Welch's Regiment of Militia =

- Active: 1777
- Allegiance: State of New Hampshire
- Type: Infantry
- Part of: New Hampshire Militia
- Engagements: Bemis Heights

Commanders
- Notable commanders: Joseph Welch

Welch's Regiment of Militia also known as the 10th New Hampshire Militia Regiment was called up at Candia, New Hampshire on September 27, 1777 as reinforcements for the Continental Army during the Saratoga Campaign of the American War of Independence. The regiment marched quickly to join the gathering forces of Gen. Horatio Gates as he faced British Gen. John Burgoyne in northern New York. The regiment served in Gen. William Whipple's brigade of New Hampshire militia. With the surrender of Burgoyne's Army on October 17 the regiment was disbanded on November 8, 1777.
