= Peabody's New Hampshire State Regiment =

- Active: 1778-1779
- Allegiance: State of New Hampshire
- Type: Infantry
- Part of: New Hampshire Militia
- Engagements: Rhode Island

Commanders
- Notable commanders: Stephen Peabody

Peabody's New Hampshire State Regiment was raised on January 1, 1778 under Col. Stephen Peabody at Hampstead, New Hampshire for service with Gen. John Sullivan in Rhode Island. The term of enlistment was one year. The regiment marched to Newport, Rhode Island and took part in the Battle of Rhode Island on August 29, 1778. The regiment was disbanded on January 1, 1779 at the end of the men's enlistments.
