= New Hampshire Militia =

American colonial military force during the 17th century

The New Hampshire Militia was a militia of the Province of New Hampshire and what is now the U.S. state of New Hampshire. First organized in 1631, it was redesignated as the New Hampshire National Guard in 1879.

== History ==
The Militia was first organized within the Province of New Hampshire, a colony of the Kingdom of England, in 1631. That instance of the militia lasted until 1641, when the area came under the jurisdiction of the Massachusetts Bay Colony.

After New Hampshire became a separate colony again in 1679, Provincial Governor John Cutt reorganized the militia on March 16, 1680, with one foot-company apiece for the four major settlements in Portsmouth, Dover, Exeter, and Hampton, and an artillery and cavalry company in Portsmouth. The King of England authorized the Provincial Governor to give commissions to persons who shall be best qualified for regulating and discipline of the militia. President Cutt placed Major Richard Waldron of Dover in command of the Militia.

In a massive re-organization in 1682 under Edward Cranfield, the militia reported directly to the governor. The entire militia was activated to suppress Gove's Rebellion in 1683.

=== Colonial era ===
The New Hampshire Militia served in all of the Colonial Wars, and was part of expeditions that captured the Fortress of Louisbourg in 1745 and Port Royal, Nova Scotia in 1710. During the last four wars of the French and Indian Wars, the New Hampshire Militia furnished about 5,000 men for six different campaigns, including men who served with Major Robert Rogers and his Rangers. Regiments of the New Hampshire provincial soldiers were at the Battle of Lake George, the Siege of Fort William Henry, the Siege of Louisbourg (1758), the 1758 Battle of Carillon and the fall of Fort Carillon (subsequently Fort Ticonderoga) in 1759, the Battle of the Plains of Abraham and the Battle of Sainte-Foy near Quebec, and were present at the final capitulation of New France at Montreal. They also saw action in countless small battles from the Hudson River to Nova Scotia.

The Militia was also heavily involved in the American Revolution when it furnished men for the New Hampshire regiments in Washington's Continental Army. John Stark, an officer in Rogers' Rangers, raised the 1st New Hampshire Regiment and took it to the Siege of Boston in 1775 and fought at the Battle of Bunker Hill, along with James Reed's 3rd New Hampshire Regiment. These two regiments along with Enoch Poor's 2nd New Hampshire Regiment entered service with the Continental Army and saw action all through the war. In 1777 John Stark led a force of 1,500 New Hampshire, Massachusetts and Vermont militia at the Battle of Bennington in a surprise attack against over 1,400 Hessian, British, Tory and Indians and won a stunning victory that helped the Continental Army win the Saratoga Campaign. Two New Hampshire militia regiments were at the Battle of Saratoga serving in Ebenezer Learned's Brigade helping to defeat General John Burgoyne. New Hampshire militia helped in Gen. John Sullivan's unsuccessful Battle of Rhode Island in 1778.

=== Civil War era (1860–1880) ===
At the beginning of the American Civil War, the Militia was virtually nonexistent. The state had to raise volunteer regiments, such as the 6th New Hampshire Volunteer Infantry, to aid in the war. In 1879, New Hampshire designated the Militia as the New Hampshire National Guard, decades before the mandatory name change required by the National Defense Act of 1916.

== Units ==
French and Indian War Provincial Units

- New Hampshire Provincial Regiment

New Hampshire Continental Army Regiments

- 1st New Hampshire Regiment
- 2nd New Hampshire Regiment
- 3rd New Hampshire Regiment
- Bedel's Regiment
- Long's Regiment
- Whitcomb's Rangers

New Hampshire Revolutionary War era militia Units

- Langdon's Company of Light Horse Volunteers
- Peabody's New Hampshire State Regiment
- Bellow's Regiment of Militia
- Chase's Regiment of Militia
- Drake's Regiment of Militia
- Evans' Regiment of Militia
- Hale's Regiment of Militia
- Hobart's Regiment of Militia
- Moore's Regiment of Militia
- Moulton's Regiment of Militia
- Nichols' Regiment of Militia
- Stickney's Regiment of Militia
- Welch's Regiment of Militia

== See also ==
- Andrew McClary, fought in the New Hampshire; present at the battle of Bunker Hill.
- List of United States militia units in the American Revolutionary War
