= Drake's Regiment of Militia =

- Active: 8 September 1777
- Disbanded: 15 December 1777
- Country: American Colonies
- Allegiance: State of New Hampshire
- Branch: Infantry
- Type: Militia
- Part of: Continental Army
- Nickname: 2nd New Hampshire Militia Regiment
- Engagements: Bemis Heights

Commanders
- Notable commanders: Abraham Drake

Drake's Regiment of Militia also known as the 2nd New Hampshire Militia Regiment was called up at Portsmouth, New Hampshire on September 8, 1777 as reinforcements for the Continental Army during the Saratoga Campaign. The regiment marched quickly to join the gathering forces of General Horatio Gates as he faced British General John Burgoyne in northern New York. The regiment served in General Ebenezer Learned's brigade of the Continental Army. With the surrender of Burgoyne's Army on October 17 the regiment was disbanded on December 15, 1777.
