= Langdon's Company of Light Horse Volunteers =

- Active: 1777-78
- Allegiance: State of New Hampshire
- Type: Dragoons
- Part of: New Hampshire Militia
- Engagements: Bennington, Bemis Heights and Rhode Island

Commanders
- Notable commanders: John Langdon

Langdon's Company of Light Horse Volunteers was formed on July 21, 1777 at Portsmouth, New Hampshire for Gen. John Stark's Brigade gathering at Charlestown, New Hampshire during the Saratoga Campaign. The company was formed by picked volunteers from other New Hampshire militia units. The company was with Stickney's and Hobart's regiments during the Battle of Bennington. Langdon's Company of Light Horse Volunteers would continue on in Stark's Brigade to cut off British Gen. John Burgoyne from retreat or supply after the Battle of Freeman's Farm. The company would also take part in Gen. John Sullivan's campaign in Rhode Island in 1778. The company was disbanded in the fall of 1778.

== Notable members ==
- Wentworth Cheswill
