= Moulton's Regiment of Militia =

- Active: 1775–1783
- Allegiance: State of New Hampshire
- Type: Infantry
- Part of: New Hampshire Militia
- Engagements: Bemis Heights

Commanders
- Notable commanders: Jonathan Moulton

Moulton's Regiment of Militia also known as the 3rd Regiment of New Hampshire Militia was first called up in April 1775 at Hampton, New Hampshire, under the command of Col. Jonathan Moulton. The regiment garrisoned the New Hampshire seacoast after the British burned the town of Falmouth, Maine, then part of Massachusetts. The regiment had a twenty-four-hour look-out at Little Boar's Head in North Hampton, New Hampshire, where all the coastal shipping could be watched and warning giving to the local area in case of attack. Col. Moulton would lead the regiment in the Saratoga Campaign joining Gen. John Stark in northern New York. The regiment would spend the rest of the American Revolutionary War guarding the seacoast of New Hampshire.
