= Evans' Regiment of Militia =

- Active: 1st activation 8 September 1777 2nd activation 1778
- Disbanded: 1st disbandment 15 December 1777 2nd disbandment 1778
- Country: American Colonies
- Allegiance: New Hampshire Colony
- Branch: Infantry
- Type: Militia
- Part of: Continental Army
- Engagements: Bemis Heights Battle of Rhode Island

Commanders
- Notable commanders: Stephen Evans

Evans' Regiment of Militia also known as the 4th New Hampshire Militia Regiment was called up at Exeter, New Hampshire on September 8, 1777 as reinforcements for the Continental Army during the Saratoga Campaign. The regiment marched quickly to join the gathering forces of General Horatio Gates as he faced British General John Burgoyne in northern New York. The regiment served in General Ebenezer Learned's brigade of the Continental Army. With the surrender of Burgoyne's Army on October 17 the regiment was disbanded on December 15, 1777. The Regiment was called up again as part of Gen. John Sullivan's army at the unsuccessful Battle of Rhode Island in 1778.

== Sources ==
- Provincial and State Papers of New Hampshire
