= Will Allen Dromgoole =

American poet and writer (1860 – 1934)

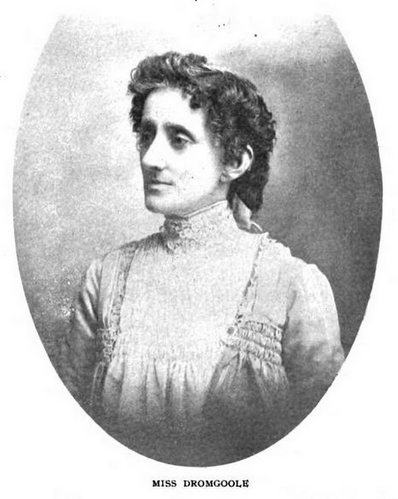
Will Allen Dromgoole, from a 1905 publication.

Will Allen Dromgoole (October 26, 1860 – September 1, 1934) was an American author and poet. She wrote over 7,501 poems; 5,000 essays; and published thirteen books. She was renowned beyond the South; her poem "The Bridge Builder" was often reprinted. It remains quite popular. The final stanza of the poem appears on a plaque at the Bellows Falls, Vermont Vilas Bridge, spanning the Connecticut River between southern Vermont and New Hampshire.

== Early life and background ==
Will Allen Dromgoole was the last of several daughters born to Rebecca Mildred (Blanche) and John Easter Dromgoole in Murfreesboro, Tennessee. Her paternal grandparents were Rev. Thomas and Fanny Dromgoole. Her great-grandparents were Edward Dromgoole, an Irish minister from Sligo, Ireland, and his wife, Rebecca Walton. He married her after immigrating to the North American colonies.

Dromgoole's parents sent her to the Clarksville Female Academy, where she graduated in 1876. She studied law with her father, but women were not allowed to become lawyers. She was appointed as staff to the state legislature, where she started working in 1883.

== Career ==
Dromgoole was a prolific writer, publishing both prose and poetry. She was also a journalist for the Nashville American, a newspaper based in the Middle Tennessee city. She first published a story in Youth's Companion in 1887. It was about the Tennessee governor, Bob Taylor. She had a best-selling novel in 1911, The Island of the Beautiful.

She taught school in Tennessee one year, and one year in Temple, Texas, where she founded the Waco Women's Press Club in 1894. During World War I, Dromgoole was a warrant officer in the United States Naval Reserve. She lectured to sailors on patriotic topics.

Dromgoole wrote a series of articles on the Southeastern ethnic group known as the Melungeons, published in the Nashville Daily American (1890) and the Boston Arena (1891). This historically mixed-race group was then living mostly in northeastern Tennessee, southwestern Virginia, and eastern Kentucky. Her derogatory comments about them, while based more on hearsay than fact, expressed the biases about mountain people typical of her society and the period in which she was writing. Since the early 20th century, Melungeons have increasingly intermarried with European Americans and integrated into mainstream white society.

== Books ==
- Heart of Old Hickory and Other Stories (1891);
- The Farrier's Dog and His Fellow (1897);
- The Fortunes of the Fellow (1898)
- Further Adventures of the Fellow (1898);
- Valley Path (1898);
- Three Little Crackers (1898);
- Hero Chums (1898);
- Rare Old Chums (1898);
- A Boy's Battle (1898);
- Cinch, and Other Tales of Tennessee (1898);
- A Moonshiner's Son (1898);
- Harum-Scarum Joe (1899);
- The Battle on Stone River (1899)
- The Island of Beautiful Things: A Romance of the South (1912)

== Later years ==
She wrote more than 7,500 poems, among them "The Bridge Builder". An excerpt appears on a plaque on the Bellows Fall-Vilas Bridge between the two respective cities in Vermont and New Hampshire. It spans the Connecticut River. The poem is frequently quoted in a religious context or in writings stressing a moral lesson. In addition, she wrote a weekly column, "Song and Story," in the Nashville Banner from 1904 until her death in 1934, published thirteen books, and two newspaper articles about the Melungeons in the Nashville Daily American which were later included as revised essays in The Arena magazine out of Boston. (At the time she referred to them as Malungeons, one of numerous spelling variations on the name.)
