= Bellows Falls Petroglyph Site =

- Bellows Falls Petroglyph Site (VT-WD-8)
- U.S. National Register of Historic Places
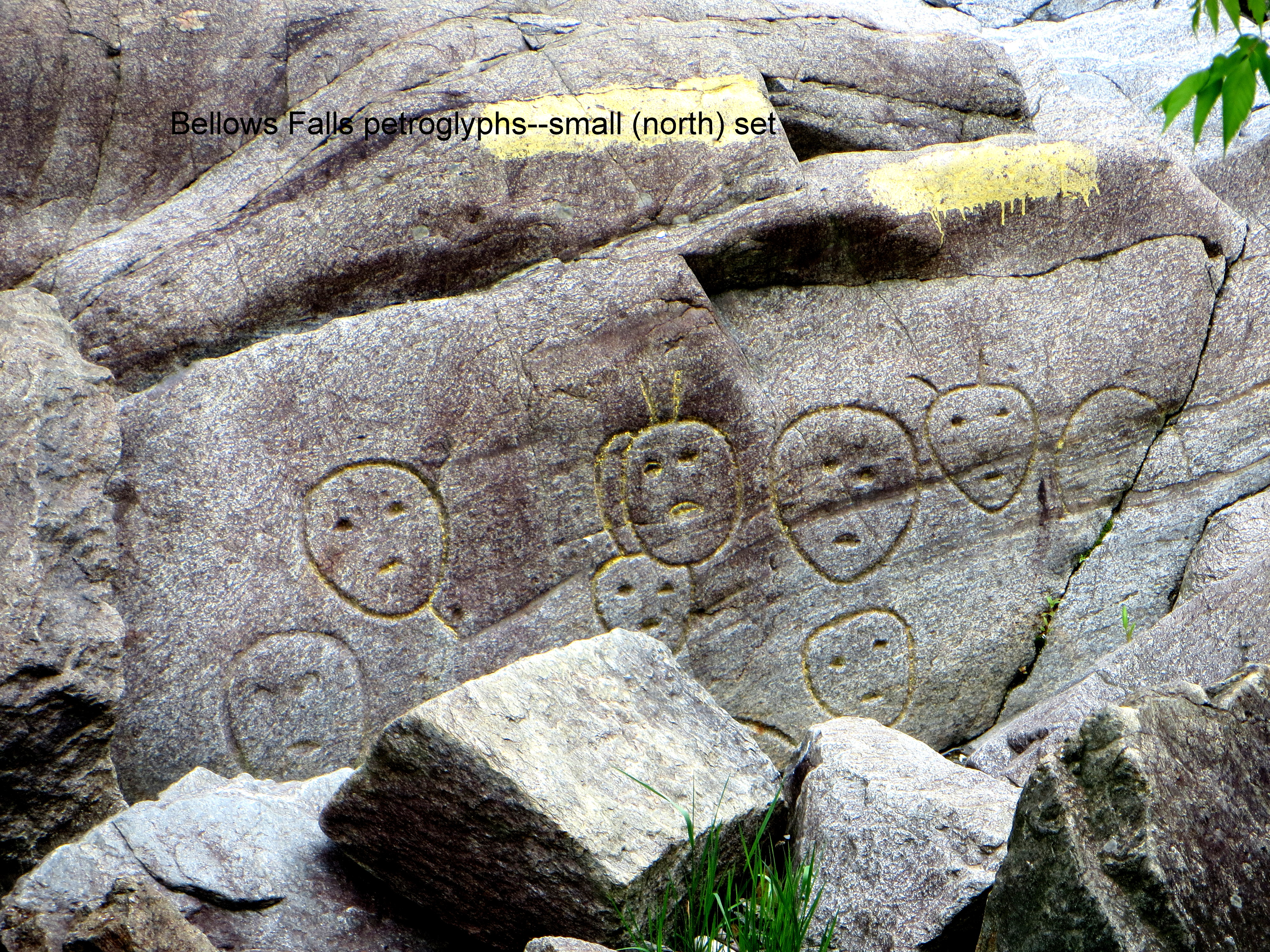
- Smaller set of petroglyphs, located 35 feet (11 m) south of the bridge. Photo was taken looking east from the road along the shore in the village of Bellows Falls.

- Location within Vermont Location within the United States
- Location: Address restricted Bellows Falls, Vermont
- Coordinates: 43°08′07.0″N 72°26′25.8″W
- Area: less than one acre
- MPS: Bellows Falls Island MRA
- NRHP reference No.: 88002166
- Added to NRHP: January 22, 1990

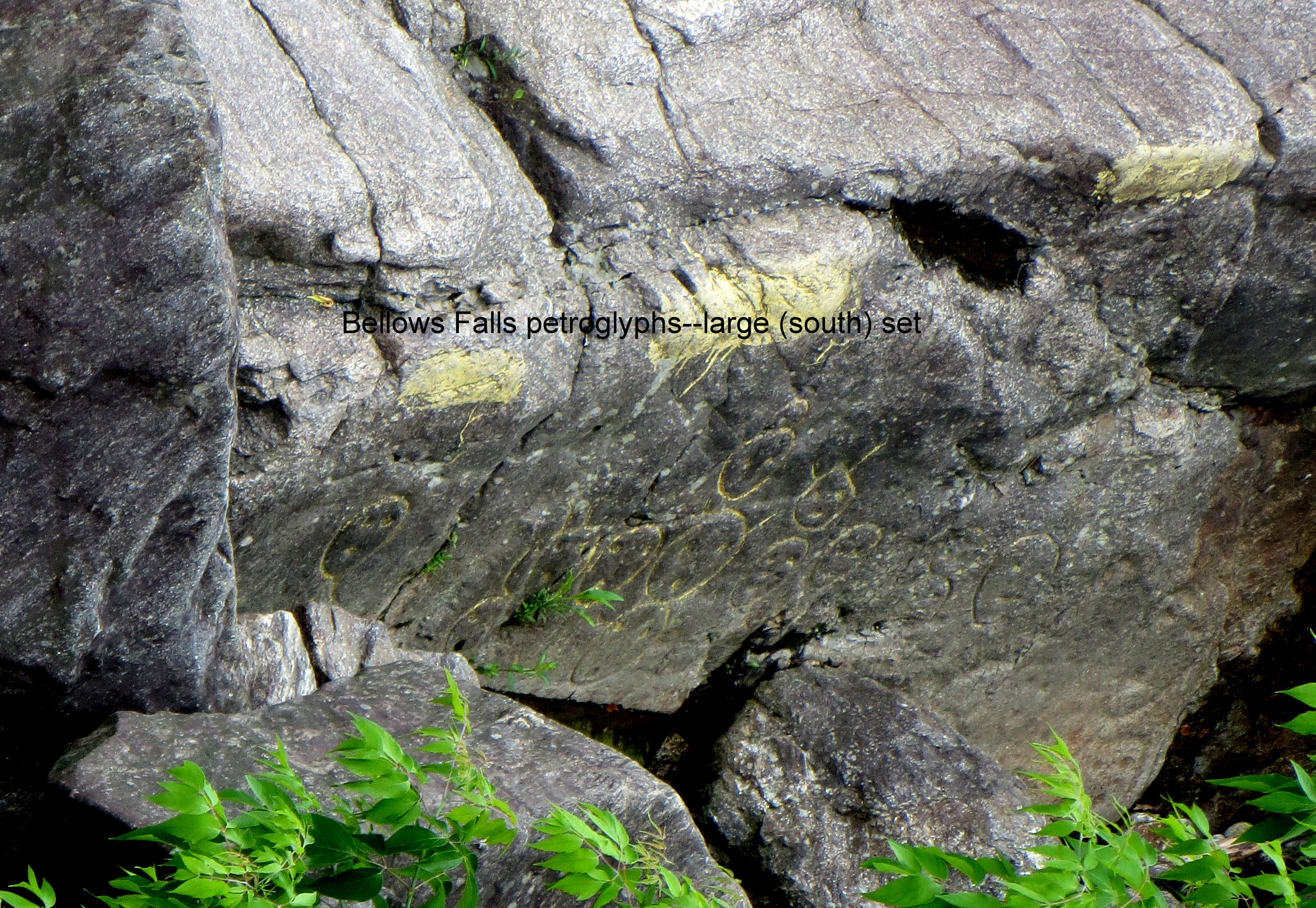
Larger set of petroglyphs at Bellows Falls, located 55 feet (17 m) south of the bridge. Photo was taken looking south from the Vilas Bridge; trees block a direct view of this set from the road along the shore.

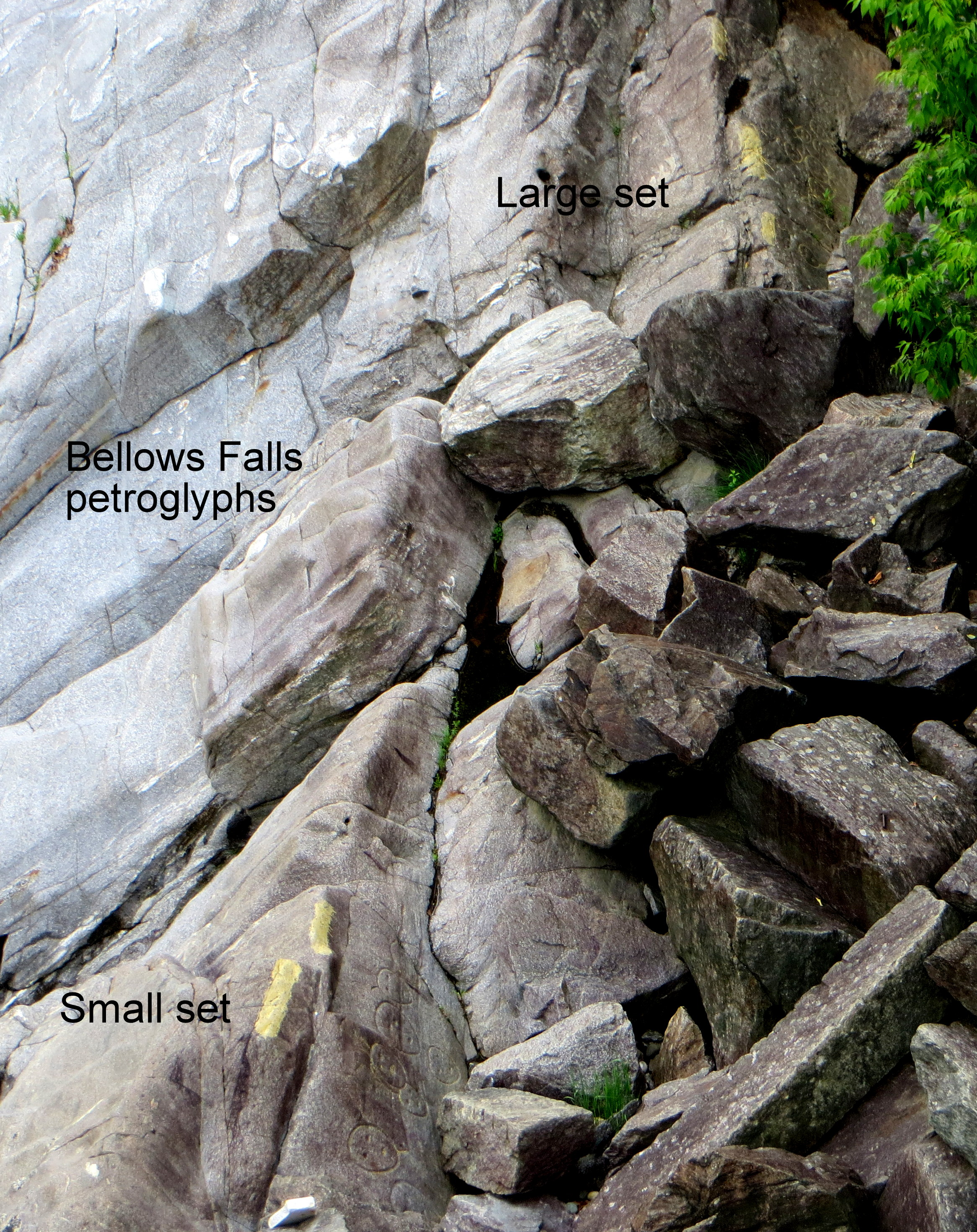
Two sets of petroglyphs at Bellows Falls, located 35 feet (11 m) and 55 feet (17 m) south of the bridge. Photo was taken looking south from the Vilas Bridge.

The Bellows Falls Petroglyph Site (designated Site VT-WD-8) is an archaeological site containing panels of precontact Native American petroglyphs in Bellows Falls, Vermont. Located near the Vilas Bridge on bedrock west of and above the Connecticut River, adjacent to Great Falls, they depict a rarely-seen assemblage of anthropomorphic figures that is believed to be unique in New England, and uncommon even in surrounding geographic areas. The site was listed on the National Register of Historic Places in 1990.

== Description ==
The petroglyph site is located on the east side of the Bellows Falls Island, south of the Vilas Bridge, which connects Bellows Falls and Walpole, New Hampshire, across the Connecticut River. There are two rock panels, located 35 feet (11 m) and 55 feet (17 m) south of the bridge, and adjacent to Great Falls. Each panel contains a series of figures interpreted as human heads, with mouths, eyes, and radiating projections. The abstract features of these heads are consistent with the traditional corn husk masks of the Abenaki and Iroquois peoples, and a similar inscription was discovered in 2015 along the banks of the West River in Brattleboro. The southern panel, about 5 feet (1.5 m) long, has eight figures, and the northern panel, about 10 feet (3.0 m) long, has sixteen. Other archaeological sites are located in the general area, but their association to this site is not known. It is known that additional panels may be protected by riprap laid along the river bank; these panels are also sometimes protected from occasional vandalism by silt deposited by the river.

The existence of these figures has been known and commented on since the late 18th century. Similar figures are rare in New England, but instances of similar figures have been identified in Pennsylvania and Canada from the Great Lakes east. Because of their rarity, they provide an unusual opportunity to establish prehistoric cultural connections between relatively disparate regions.

== See also ==
- National Register of Historic Places listings in Windham County, Vermont
