= Great Falls (Connecticut River) =

Coordinates: 43°8′9″N 72°26′23″W

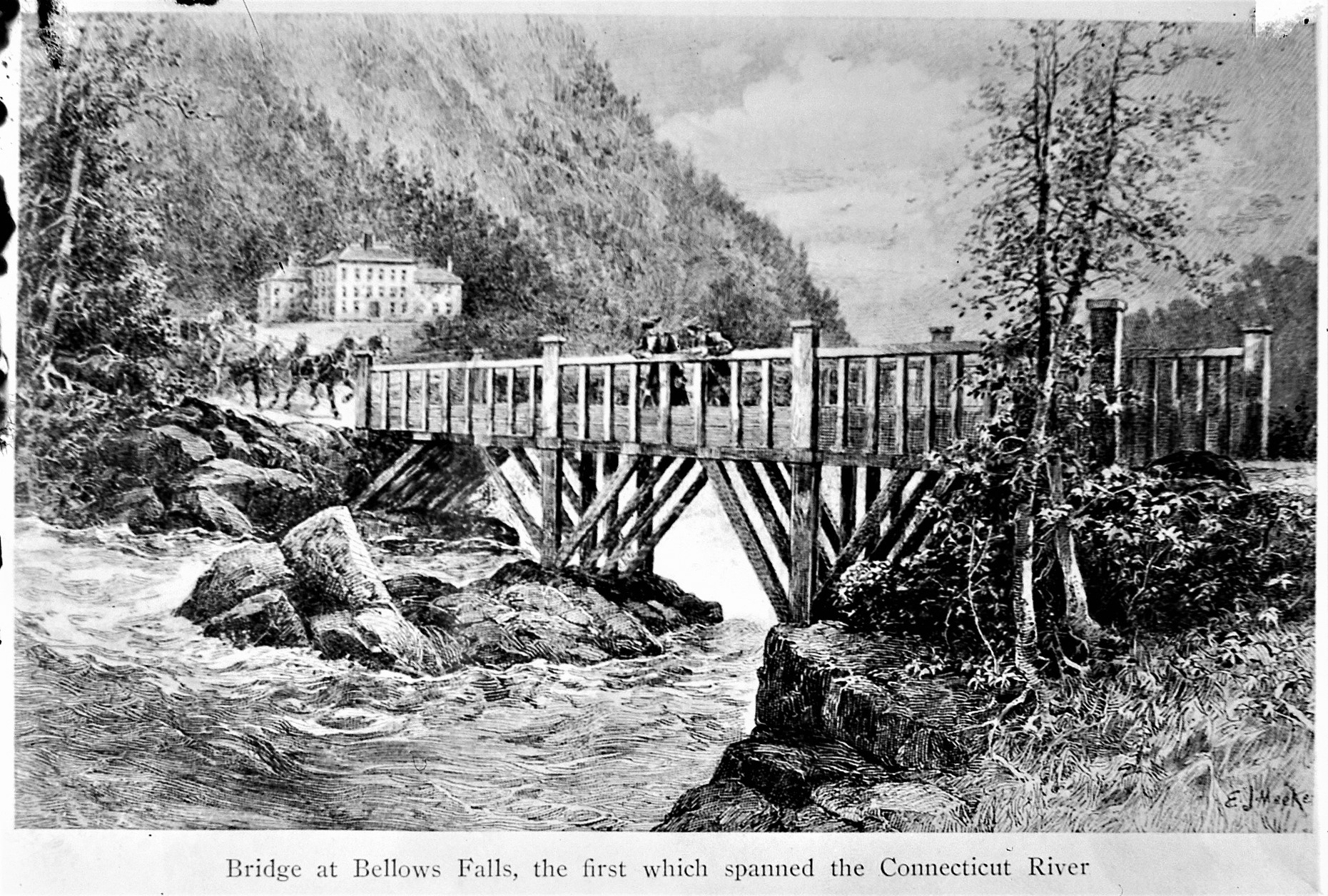
Enoch Hale bridge, first bridge to cross the Connecticut River, built 1785

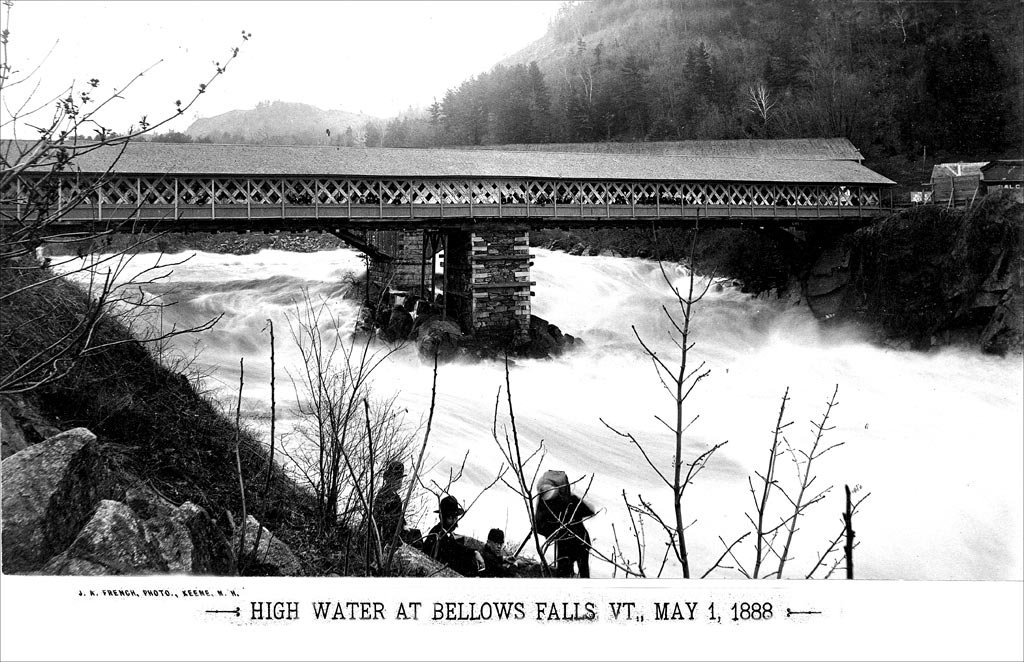
Tucker Toll Bridge (built 1840) at high water in Bellows Falls, VT (1888 photo)

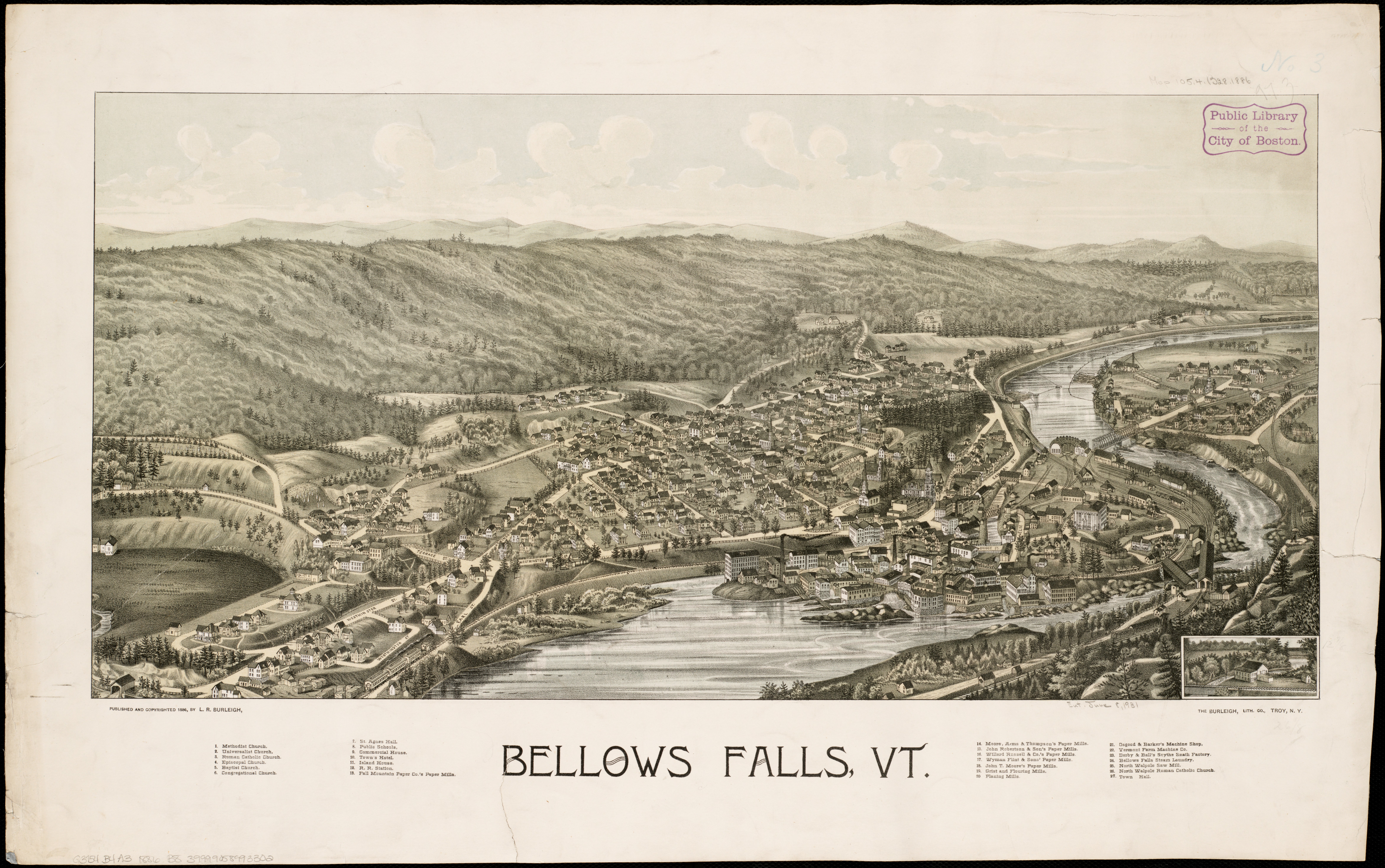
1886 birds-eye map of Bellows Falls; Great Falls at right edge

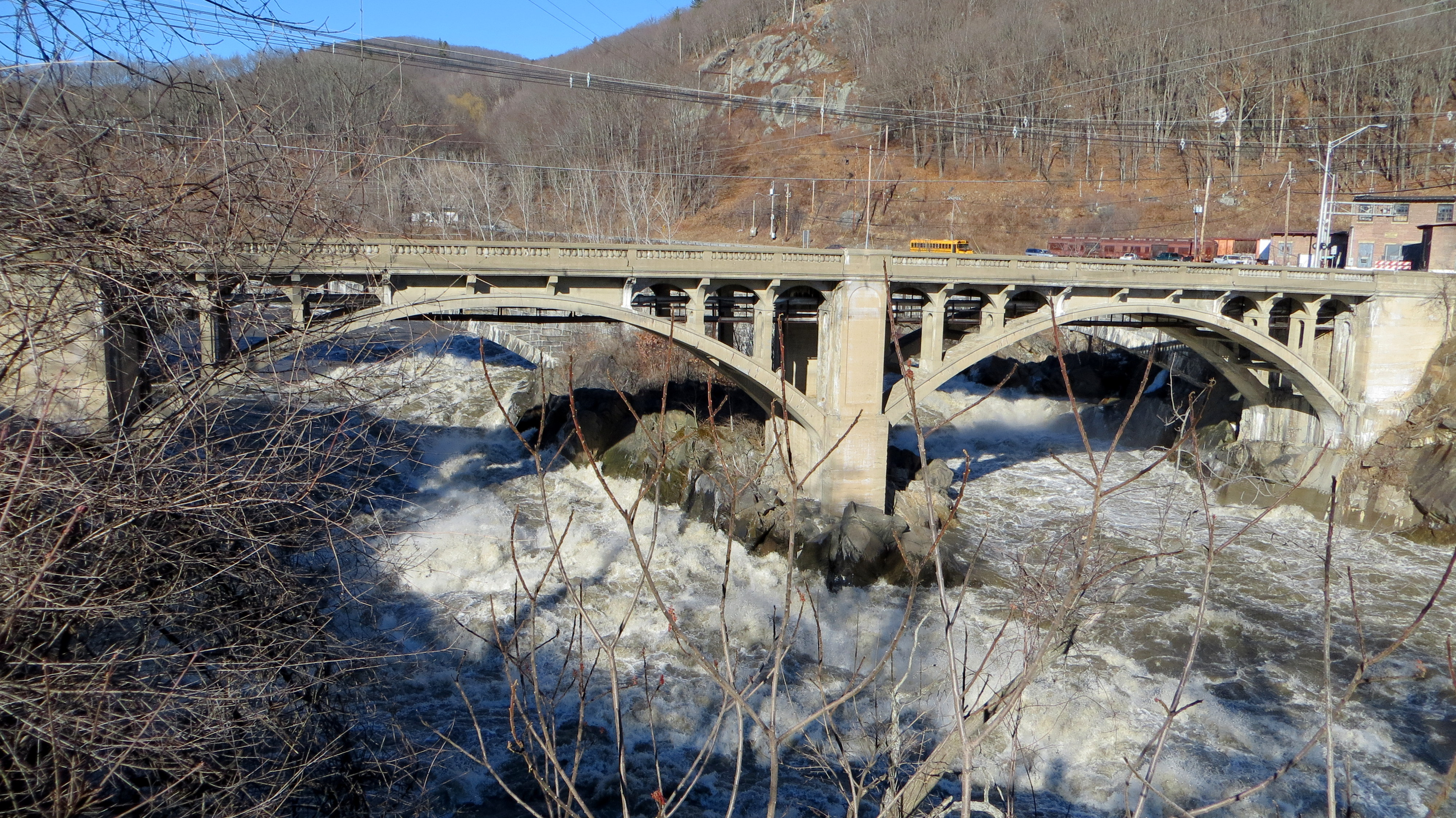
Vilas Bridge (built 1930) with Great Falls at high flow, February 26, 2016

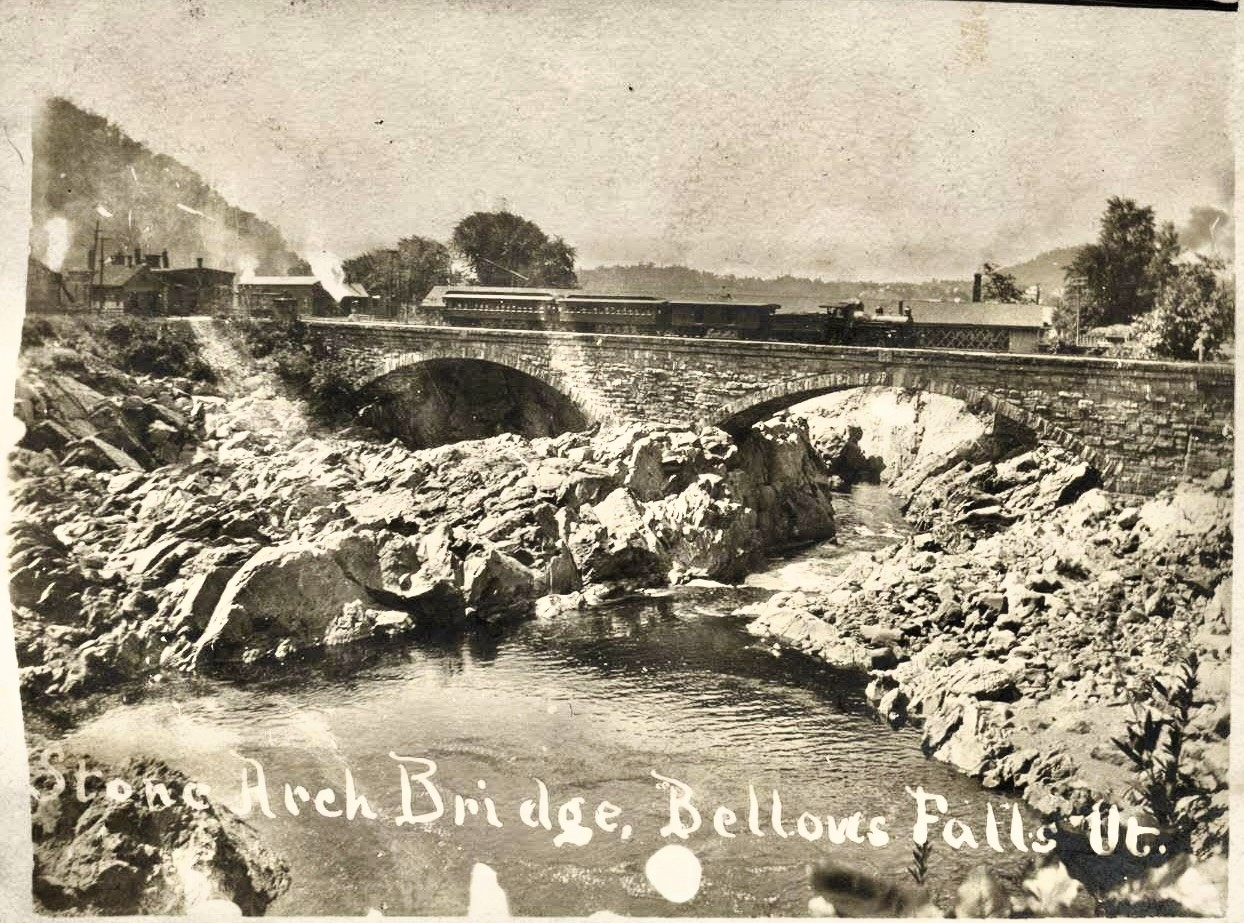
The stone arch railroad bridge between Walpole, NH, and Bellows Falls, VT

Great Falls is a waterfall along the Connecticut River between Walpole, New Hampshire, and Bellows Falls, Vermont. It has also been called Bellows Falls, and its Abenaki name is Kitchee Pontegu, which means "great falls". Great Falls became its official name, based on local usage, in 2016. It drops 52 feet (16 m), and the village of Bellows Falls (within the town of Rockingham, Vermont) was established next to it, to take advantage of its water power. Previously, the main settlement in town, Rockingham Village, was on a high point of land overlooking the Williams River, with no potential for water power.

The Bellows Falls Canal, one of the first canals built in the United States, was dug by a British-owned company from 1791-1802 to bypass Great Falls for river travel. After it was widened and deepened in 1926-28 to bring more water to a new hydroelectric plant, increasing its flow from 1 million gallons per minute to 4.2 million gallons per minute, there was less water going over Great Falls, except during late winter and spring high flow (see fourth photo at right). In order to make room in the river below the tail race for this much greater volume of water, extensive blasting of the bedrock of the river bed was done in winter 1928, and the stone removed was used to extend the shoreline on the Vermont side, just downriver of the tail race. Three workers were killed when the dynamite shed exploded.

The Great Falls gorge is the narrowest point along the whole river, so it was the site of the first bridge across the river, built by Colonel Enoch Hale in 1785. This bridge was replaced by the Tucker Toll Bridge in 1840, built 15 feet (4.6 m) above the old bridge; the old bridge had come close to being washed away in floods. The Tucker Toll Bridge is visible in the second and third images at the right of this page. Tolls were suspended on the Tucker Bridge after it was bought by the two adjoining towns in 1904.

The Tucker Bridge was presumably used less after a new bridge between Bellows Falls and Walpole, the steel Arch Bridge, was built upriver of the dam in 1905. The Tucker Bridge was then replaced by the Vilas Bridge in 1930 (fourth image at the right). The Vilas Bridge was closed to all traffic in 2009 because it was dangerous, and there are currently (as of 2020) no firm plans to repair or replace it.

There was a covered railroad bridge across the gorge just upriver of the toll bridge, visible in the second and third images at the right. This bridge was built for the Cheshire Railroad a few months after the completion of the railroad between Fitchburg and Bellows Falls in 1849. The covered railroad bridge was judged to be unsafe and was replaced by an uncovered stone arch bridge in 1899 which still stands (see the fifth image at the right). There were also a series of railroad bridges upriver from the gorge, near the dam, for a different railroad line: a covered bridge in 1851, an iron lattice bridge in 1882, and the current steel girder bridge in 1912.

There were major spring log drives on the Connecticut River from 1869 to 1915, with smaller drives through 1919. Some of the logs were pulled out of the river above the dam and the falls, and used in local paper mills, but some were sent over the dam and down the falls, with men in the gorge guiding the logs. Most of the logs were sent to sawmills near Holyoke, Massachusetts. Logs were stored in coves along the river, including Albees Cove just upriver of Bellows Falls. Stone piers were built at intervals around these coves, which were used to anchor long logs that were chained between the piers just before the log drive. The tops of those piers were later removed, but the shortened pillars of stone can still be seen at low water.

Two people are known to have traversed the falls and survived. The first was an "Indian woman" (before 1781, when it was reported) who made the trip lying down in a canoe. She had been attempting to cross the river above the falls but was pulled into the falls by the current. The second was Captain Paul Boyton, who passed through the falls in a rubber floating suit on October 30, 1879, with about 2,000 spectators. "[Boyton] said the water bore him down with a terrible weight to the bottom of the channel and for a few moments he confidently expected it would hold him there to his death."

There are two groups of petroglyphs on the Vermont side of the falls, called the Bellows Falls Petroglyph Site, just downstream of the Vilas Bridge. Depending on the height and density of the riverbank vegetation, and the river level, the petroglyphs may be visible through binoculars from near the eastern end of Bridge Street in Bellows Falls, without climbing down the steep bank.

== See also ==
- List of waterfalls
