= The Bridge Builder =

Poem by Will Allen Dromgoole

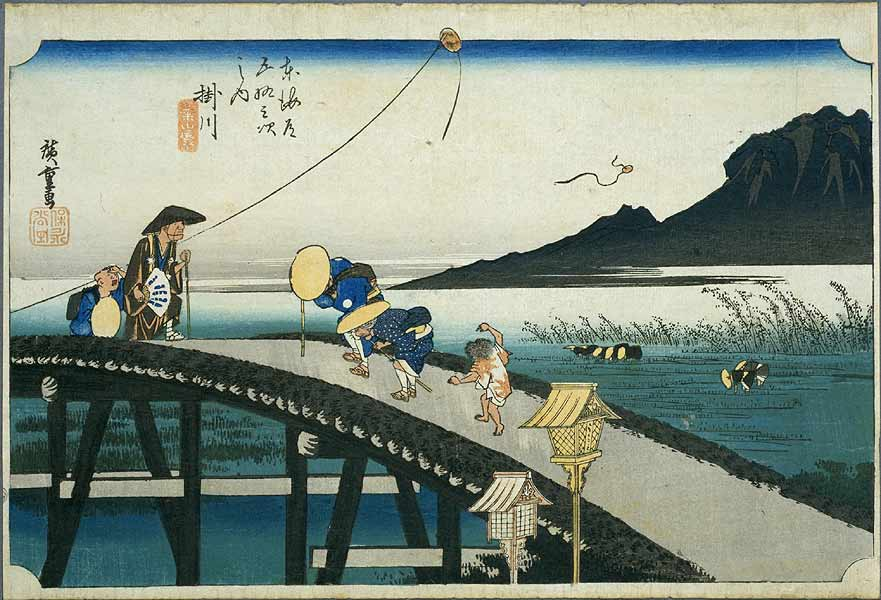
Kakegawa on the Tokaido, ukiyo-e prints by Hiroshige

"The Bridge Builder" is a poem written by Will Allen Dromgoole. "The Bridge Builder" has been frequently reprinted, including on a plaque on the Vilas Bridge, Bellows Falls, Vermont, in New Hampshire. The poem continues to be quoted frequently, usually in a religious context or in writings stressing a moral lesson.

The text has been attested since at least 1898 in Rare Old Chums by Dromgoole. In said book, the poem is titled "Building the Bridge", and is composed and sung by a girl living near Elk River in Eastern Tennessee.

The 1898 version of the text appears below in its entirety.

== Building the Bridge (1898) ==
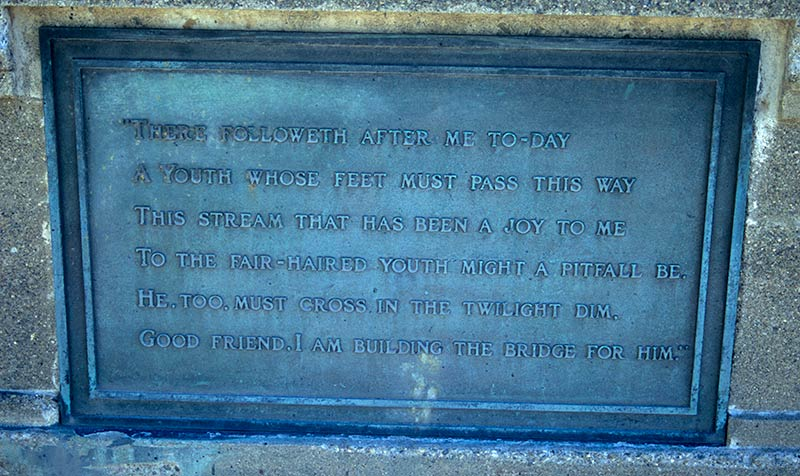
The final stanza of the poem "The Bridge Builder" by Will Allen Dromgoole as engraved on the Vilas Bridge.

An old man, going a lone highway,
Came, at the evening, cold and gray,
To a chasm, vast, and deep, and wide,
Through which was flowing a sullen tide.
The old man crossed in the twilight dim;
The sullen stream had no fears for him;
But he turned, when safe on the other side,
And built a bridge to span the tide.
"Old man", said a fellow pilgrim, near,
"You are wasting strength with building here;
Your journey will end with the ending day;
You never again will pass this way;
You've crossed the chasm, deep and wide, —
Why build you this bridge at the eventide?"

The builder lifted his old gray head:
"Good friend, in the path I have come", he said,
"There followeth after me to-day
A youth, whose feet must pass this way.
This chasm, that has been naught to me,
To that fair-haired youth may a pitfall be.
He, too, must cross in the twilight dim;
Good friend, I am building this bridge for him."
