= William A. Hall House =

Historic house in Vermont, United States

- U.S. National Register of Historic Places
- U.S. Historic district – Contributing property
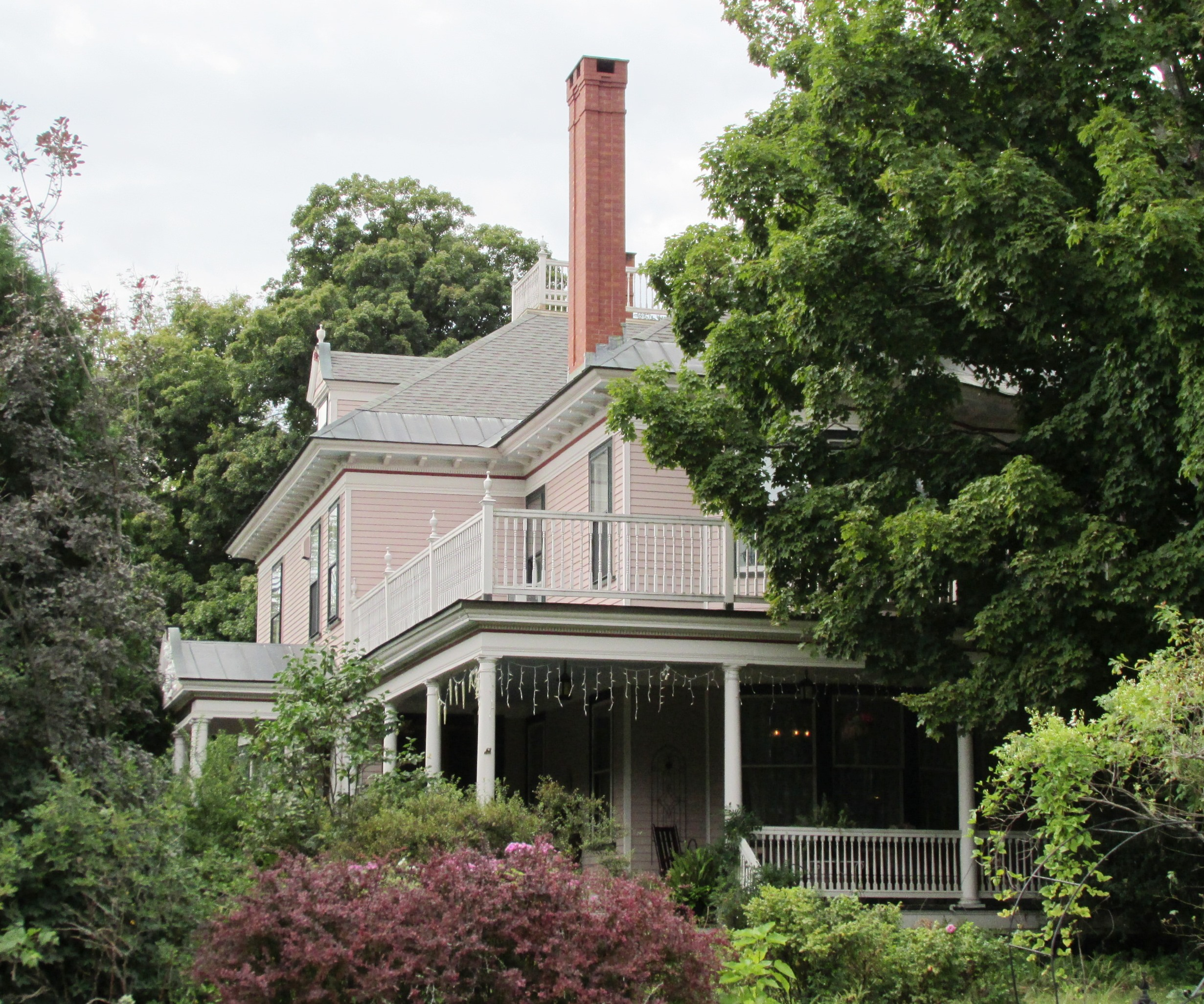
- (2013)

- Location within Vermont Location within the United States
- Location: 1 Hapgood St., Bellows Falls, Vermont
- Coordinates: 43°7′48″N 72°26′44″W
- Area: less than one acre
- Built: 1892
- Architectural style: Colonial Revival
- Part of: Bellows Falls Neighborhood Historic District (ID01001477)
- NRHP reference No.: 99000537

Significant dates
- Added to NRHP: May 5, 1999
- Designated CP: January 17, 2002

The William A. Hall House is a historic house at 1 Hapgood Street in Bellows Falls, Vermont. Built in 1890–92, it is one of Vermont's finest early expressions of Colonial Revival architecture. It is notable for its first three residents, who all played prominent roles in the major businesses of Bellows Falls, and was listed on the National Register of Historic Places in 1999. It is now the Readmore Inn.

== Description and history ==
The Hall House is located a short way south of downtown Bellows Falls, at the northwest corner of Westminster and Hapgood Streets. It is a large, rectangular wood-frame structure, three stories in height, with a dormered hip roof, clapboard siding, and a granite foundation. A single-story porch extends across the front and wraps around to the left side, with a turned balustrade and Tuscan columns. The east facade, facing Westminster Street, consists of two bays, each of which is taken up by a two-story bowed three-window bay. The entrance is located on the south side, sheltered by a gabled porch similar to the one across the front. The interior retains elaborate original woodwork and finishes, include a glass chandelier and fireplace surrounds.

The house, whose architect is not known, was built between 1892 and 1894 for William A. Hall, an executive and experimental chemist associated with the Fall Mountain Paper Company, one of Bellows Falls' leading companies. Hall, a Massachusetts native, may have played a role in bringing the Colonial Revival aesthetic to Bellows Falls, for this is one of the earliest elaborate examples of the style in the region. In 1903 Hall sold the house to Francis G. Flint, part owner of a local paper mill. John Babbitt, the third owner of this house, owned one of the largest manufacturers in the nation of waxed paper. In the 1990s the building was restored and adapted for use as a bed and breakfast inn.

== See also ==
- National Register of Historic Places listings in Windham County, Vermont
