= James F. Howard Jr. =

- Born: James Francis Howard Jr. May 3, 1948 (age 78); Bellows Falls, Vermont
- Education: University of Vermont
- Occupation: Neurology/medicine professor

James Francis Howard Jr. (born May 3, 1948) is a Professor of Neurology and Medicine at University of North Carolina at Chapel Hill.

== Career ==
Howard was born on May 3, 1948, in Bellows Falls, Vermont. He received a BA in 1970 and a M.D. in 1974, both from the University of Vermont.

Howard became an assistant professor of neurology and medicine at the University of North Carolina at Chapel Hill in 1979, he was promoted to associate professor in 1985, and promoted to full professor in 1992. He is also an adjunct professor of clinical sciences (neurology) at the North Carolina State University.

=== Awards ===
In 2003 a chair was endowed in Professor Howard's name for the exceptional care given to a member of the Broyhill family in the years before. The intent is to support clinical research into myasthenia gravis and other neuromuscular disorders.
