= Robert Gillis =

American football coach

Biographical details
- Born: June 21, 1926; Bellows Falls, Vermont, U.S.
- Died: April 19, 2009 (aged 82); Ossipee, New Hampshire, U.S.

Coaching career (HC unless noted)
- 1956–1958: Adrian

Head coaching record
- Overall: 9–15

Robert J. Gillis (June 21, 1926 – April 19, 2009) was an American football coach born in Bellows Falls, Vermont. He studied at S. from Adrian College in Adrian, Michigan, MA at the University of Michigan and PhD at Springfield College. Gillis was the head football coach at Adrian College. He held that position for three seasons, from 1956 until 1958. His coaching record at Adrian was 9–15. He was a resident of Wolfeboro, New Hampshire. Gillis moved up from coaching football to being the athletic director at Adrian College for many years. With the retirement of long time college president, John Dawson, Gillis became the dean of students for approximately four years, until his retirement in 1986.

== Head coaching record ==
Year	Team	Overall	Conference	Standing	Bowl/playoffs
Adrian Bulldogs (Michigan Intercollegiate Athletic Association) (1956–1958)
1956	Adrian	3–5	2–4	5th	
1957	Adrian	3–5	1–5	6th	
1958	Adrian	3–5	2–4	5th	
Adrian:		9–15	5–13		
Total:		9–15			
