= Israel Lund =

American painter (born 1980)

Israel Lund (born 1980) is a conceptual painter based in Brooklyn, New York. He creates acrylic paintings using a combination of digital and analog techniques including silk-screening; digital painting; and the manipulation of photocopies, photographs and PDFs through smartphone applications. His practice has been described as its “own distinctive kind of post-digital abstraction.”

Lund's work concerns the “modularity and scalability” of analog painting. As described by critic and art historian Alex Bacon, Lund's paintings evoke an uncanny “screen-space” that is produced in an “analog-mode” via a silk-screening process, a concept that the artist refers to as “analog.jpg”. In his recent work, this process involves imprinting the palette knife through a silk screen onto the warp and weft of raw, coarse canvas. The result is a dappled or “pixelated” miasma of cyan, magenta, and yellow. Thea Ballard describes Lund's regimented technique as “ascetic”:

“This method is perhaps ascetic, following strict parameters of both process and dimension; most of his works conform to the dimensions of 8.5 x 11 inches (such economical tendencies nod to Lund’s roots in hardcore punk and zine-making). His initial experiments were rendered in black and white, but Lund also uses cyan, magenta, and yellow ink, a nod to CMYK printing, method commonly used reproduce photographs in print, in which these colors overlap to create a spectrum.”

Working within a set of specific material constraints, Lund pushes painterly abstraction to its absolute limit. Ballard continues: “The canvas itself is less an endpoint than several (or maybe infinite?) portals or nodes through which these images are transferred.”

The artist's background in hardcore punk, according to Ballard, brings a sense of musicality to bear on his work: “Lund is fond of the term noise, which here stands in well for texture, inscribing the work with a dissident musicality.” Laura McLean-Ferris alternately describes this aural quality as “the snow crash of white noise.” She writes: “What the noiselike qualities of Lund’s paintings, scatterings of buzz and drag, also powerfully resist is translatability, another historic signifying system that has classically been attached to painting.”

== Exhibitions ==
Israel Lund's work has been shown at The Rachofsky Collection, The Warehous, Dallas; David Lewis, New York; Lumber Room, Portland; Base Arte Contemporanea Odierna (BACO) in collaboration with Galleria d’Arte Modernae Contemporanea di Bersgamo (GAMeC); White Flag Projects, St. Louis; and The Power Station, Dallas; among others.

== Collections ==
Lund's work is featured in the collections of the Base Arte Contemporanea Odierna (BACO), Bergamo, Italy; Bienecke Rare Book and Manuscript Library, Yale, New Haven; Bowdoin College Museum of Art, Brunswick; Cincinnati Art Museum, Cincinnati; Cleveland Museum of Art; Dallas Museum of Art; Henry Art Gallery, Seattle; MoMA Library, New York; Phoenix Art Museum; Princeton University Art Museum; and the UBS Art Collection, Zürich.
