= Vilas Bridge =

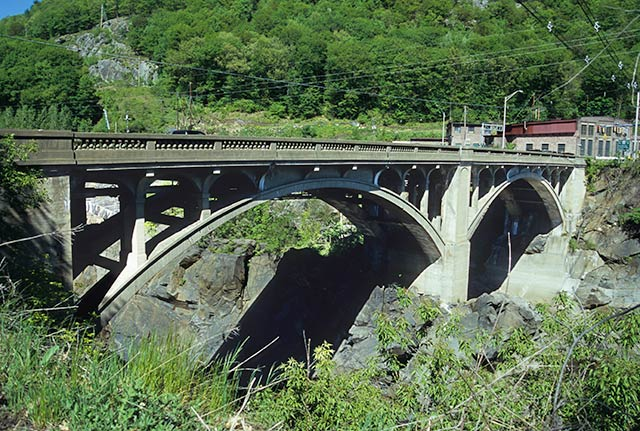
- Vilas Bridge in 2008
- Coordinates: 43°08′07″N 72°26′25″W
- Crosses: Connecticut River
- Locale: between Bellows Falls, Vermont and North Walpole, New Hampshire
- Official name: Charles N. Vilas Bridge

Characteristics
- Design: open-spandrel deck arch bridge
- Material: Concrete
- Total length: 635 feet (194 m)
- Width: 24 feet (7.3 m)
- No. of spans: 2
- Piers in water: 1

History
- Construction end: 1930
- Closed: March 2009

The Charles N. Vilas Bridge is a 635-foot (194 m) two-span concrete deck arch bridge over the Connecticut River between Bellows Falls, Vermont, and North Walpole, New Hampshire. It was built in 1930 and has been closed since March 19, 2009. The state of New Hampshire has budgeted funds to repair the bridge, with work scheduled to begin in 2028.

== History ==
Colonel Enoch Hale built a wooden covered toll bridge on this site in 1784, the first bridge over the Connecticut River. The toll was 3¢ for a man on horseback, double if he were in a chaise. If he were in a two-horse chaise, the toll was 20¢.

Captain Isaac Damon replaced Hale's bridge with the lattice truss Tucker Toll Bridge in 1840. He built lattice truss covered bridges all over New England and New York, including 11 over the Connecticut River.

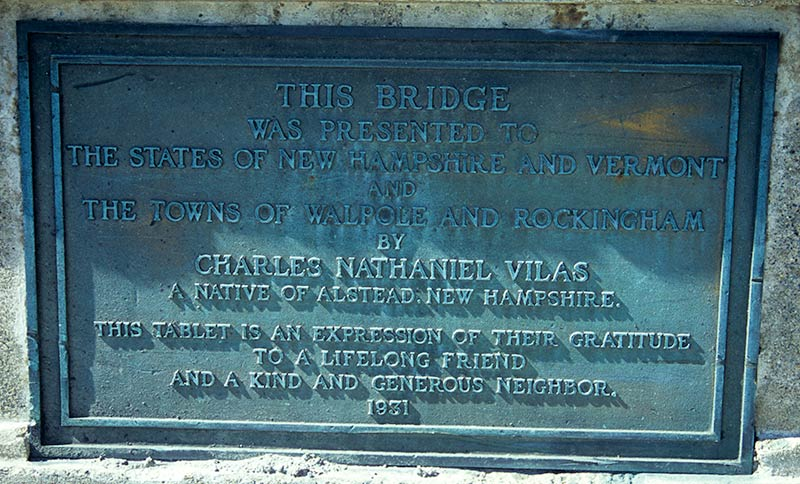
Vilas Bridge dedication plaque

The Vilas Bridge was built in 1930, rehabilitated in 1974, and closed on March 19, 2009. It is a two-span, concrete arch bridge with open spandrels and "turned" concrete bolsters holding up its railing. A plaque is mounted on the bridge containing a section of "The Bridge Builder" by Will Allen Dromgoole.

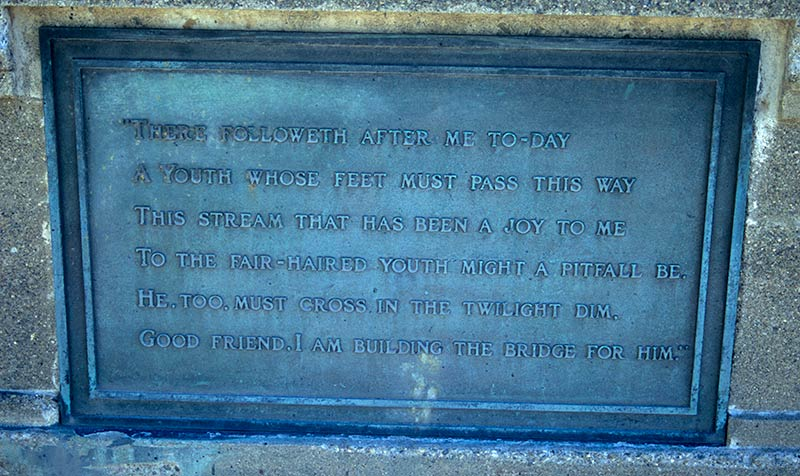
The final stanza of the poem "The Bridge Builder" by Will Allen Dromgoole as engraved on the Vilas Bridge

The bridge was named in honor of Charles Nathaniel Vilas of Alstead, New Hampshire, who donated funds for its construction. Vilas was a philanthropist who had owned and managed a hotel on Fifth Avenue in New York City; he died in 1931 at the age of 78.

=== Rehabilitation effort ===
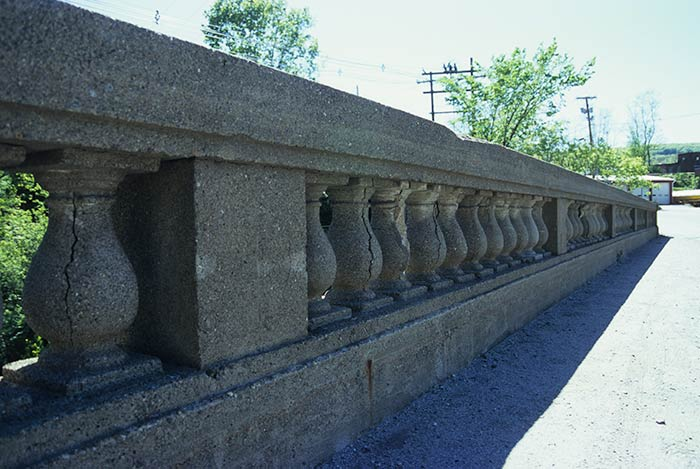
Concrete railing of the Vilas Bridge in 2008.

The condition of this bridge has been a concern of the community for some time because it has been crumbling. New Hampshire delayed repairs due to financial restrictions on the New Hampshire Department of Transportation (NHDoT). The Vermont Agency of Transportation (VTrans) has made overtures to the NHDoT to get the bridge open sooner, as the NHDoT was in the middle of a financial crisis. VTrans' commissioner Brian Searles made the offer to Chris Clement at the NHDoT in December 2013 to front the repair money if NHDoT would fund Vermont's part of other repairs later.

Opponents of repair state that there are other bridges nearby which serve this community, so the Vilas Bridge is not needed, while other bridges without any nearby alternatives are also in need of maintenance. New Hampshire rejected Vermont's offer.

New Hampshire bill HB 1205 was created in 2014 to split the estimated $5M repair cost evenly with Vermont, instead of the usual 7 percent from Vermont and 93 percent from New Hampshire by ownership percentage. Further action will mean putting the Vilas Bridge back on New Hampshire's 10-year plan, which requires New Hampshire legislative action.

In 2021, Rockingham, Vermont, researched whether federal funds were available to help pay for repairs. New Hampshire had about $10 million budgeted for repairs as part of their 10-year plan. In 2022, New Hampshire budgeted $17.7 million in its 10-year plan to repair the bridge, with work scheduled to begin in 2028.

== See also ==
- List of crossings of the Connecticut River

== Bibliography ==
- Allen, Richard Sanders (2004). Covered Bridges of the Northeast (3rd ed.). Mineola, New York: Dover Publications, Inc. ISBN 0-486-43662-4.
- Hard, Walter (1998). The Connecticut. Lincoln, MA: Massachusetts Audubon Society. ISBN 0-932691-27-7.
