= Bellows Falls, Vermont =

Bellows Falls
- Village
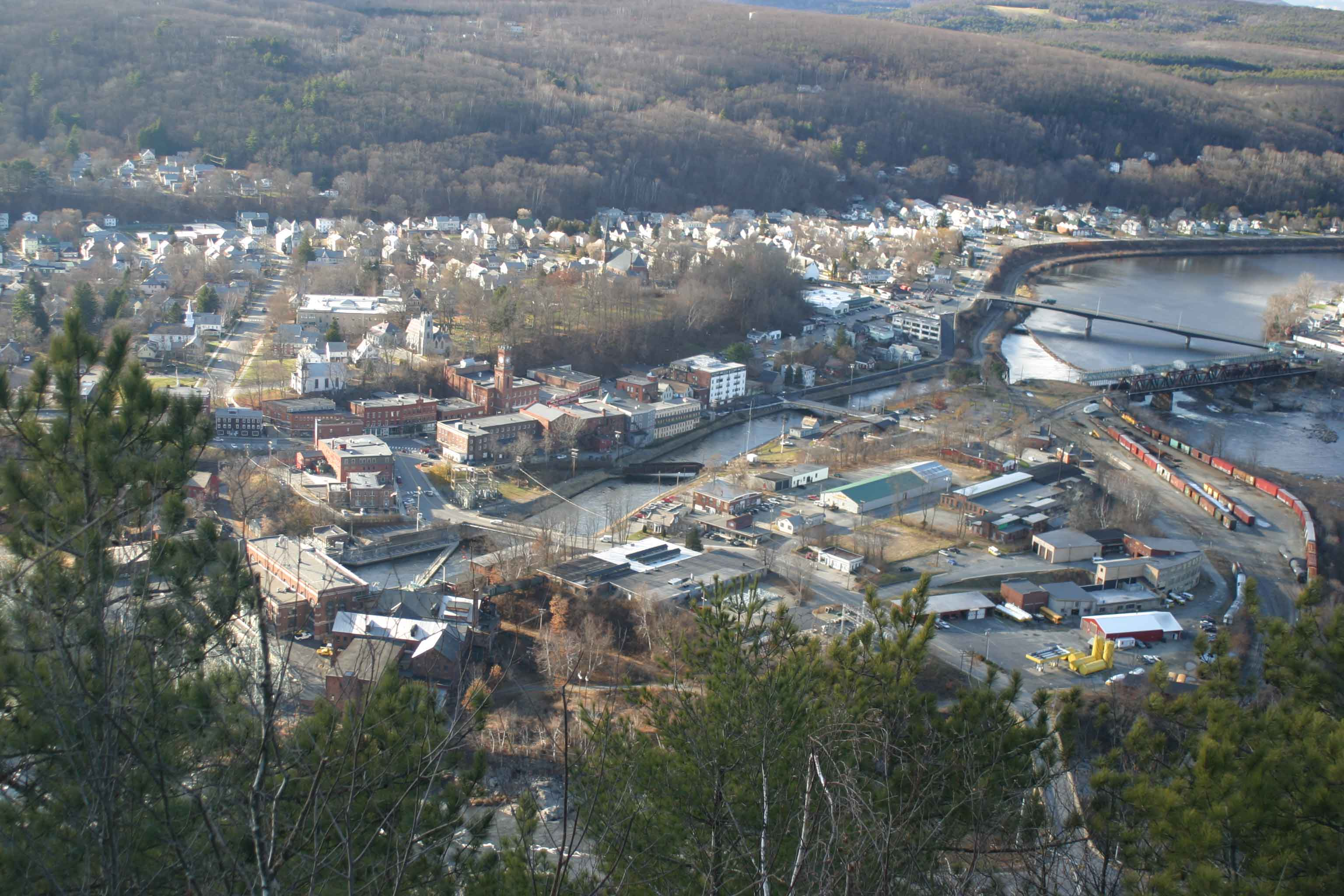
- Bellows Falls in the early spring, viewed from Fall Mountain in New Hampshire
- Interactive map of Bellows Falls
- Coordinates: 43°08′00″N 72°26′38″W
- Country: United States
- State: Vermont
- County: Windham
- Town: Rockingham
- Incorporated: 1909

Area
  - Total: 1.39 sq mi (3.59 km^{2})
  - Land: 1.37 sq mi (3.55 km^{2})
  - Water: 0.019 sq mi (0.05 km^{2})
- Elevation: 545 ft (166 m)

Population (2020)
  - Total: 2,747
  - Density: 2,005.1/sq mi (774.2/km^{2})
- Time zone: UTC-5 (Eastern (EST))
  - Summer (DST): UTC-4 (EDT)
- ZIP code: 05101
- Area code: 802
- FIPS code: 50-04225
- GNIS feature ID: 1456381
- Website: Official website

Bellows Falls is one of two incorporated villages located in the town of Rockingham in Windham County, Vermont, United States. It is a 1.4 square miles (3.6 km^{2}) area bounded on the east by the Connecticut River, and as of the 2020 census, the population was 2,747. It is home to the Bellows Falls Petroglyph Site, the Green Mountain Railroad, including Bellows Falls station, and they host the annual Roots on the River Festival and the No Film Film Festival.

== History ==
The community was settled in 1753 by colonists of English descent, who called it Great Falls. Later the settlers renamed the town for Colonel Benjamin Bellows, a landowner, but kept the name "Great Falls" for the waterfall, a translation of their Abenaki name, "Kitchee pontegu."

In 1785, Colonel Enoch Hale built the first bridge over the Connecticut River, and it remained the only bridge across the Connecticut River until another was built in Springfield, Massachusetts in 1796. In 1820, Nathaniel Tucker bought the old bridge site and funded its reconstruction when it started becoming unsafe. There are only two bridges that currently link Bellows Falls to New Hampshire: the Vilas Bridge and the New Arch Bridge, also called the Church Street Bridge, replacing the Arch Bridge in 1982.

The Bellows Falls Canal, one of the first canals built in the United States, was dug by a British-owned company from 1791 to 1802. The original canal was 22 feet wide and four feet deep, and had 9 locks, each 75 feet long and 20 feet wide, which allowed shipping to go around Great Falls by being lifted 52 feet (16 m) around the gorge. River traffic declined after railroads were built to the Connecticut Valley in 1849, and by 1858 the canal had become used exclusively for water power to run the paper mills which became established there. In 1874 the canal was enlarged to 75 feet wide and 17 feet deep. By 1908 it was delivering 15,000 horsepower to the mills. When the mills replaced water power with electrical power, the canal was widened again in 1927–28 to 100 feet, and the water was used to power turbines to generate electricity. The canal's bottom was lined with concrete, and the sides secured with rip-rap set in concrete. A fish ladder allows salmon to continue upstream at times when the bulk of the river's flow is diverted to the canal. The canal is now part of the Bellows Falls Downtown Historic District.

In 1802, entrepreneurs built the first paper mill in Windham County. Two railroads converged in 1849 at Bellows Falls, helping it develop into a major mill town. By 1859, a woolen textile mill was operating, in addition to factories that produced furniture, marble, sashes and blinds, iron castings, carriages, cabinetware, rifles, harness, shoe pegs and organs.

The years of industry created wealth in the town, and substantial Victorian houses and mercantile buildings were constructed. Bellows Falls today attracts visitors through heritage tourism based on its historic Victorian architecture. The commercial town center, along with the canal, the bridges spanning it, and several neighborhoods of houses, were listed as historic districts on the National Register of Historic Places, as were individual landmarks such as the historic railroad station and the Adams Gristmill Warehouse.

=== Bellows Falls Neighborhood Historic District ===
The Bellows Falls Neighborhood Historic District is a roughly 42-acre (17 ha) wide residential area south of downtown Bellows Falls. It is bound by School Street on the north, by Westminster Street on the east, and by Atkinson Street (United States Route 5) on the west, extending a short way west Burt Street and Hapgood Place. During the 19th century, the primary industrial area and the village downtown immediately west of the canal grew. Residential neighborhoods grew west and south of the downtown, and it now has one of the largest concentrations of well-preserved 19th century residences in southern Vermont. In 2007, the area was enlarged by about 9 acres (3.6 ha) to include the southwest, extending that boundary south of Burt Street to Pine and Center Streets, and Old Terrace to the southeast.

Most of the housing in this area is wood-frame construction and buildings typically containing one to three units. Much of the housing stock was built between 1850 and 1920, when the village was economically at its peak, and represent a cross section of architectural styles of that period. Institutional buildings include two schools, two churches, two fraternal meeting houses, a library, and a funeral home. More than 90% of the buildings in the district were built before 1950, a remarkably high concentration for districts of this size. The oldest buildings in the area date to the late 18th century.

=== Miss Bellows Falls Diner ===
Miss Bellows Falls Diner

Miss Bellows Falls Diner is a historic diner on the southwest side of Rockingham Street, just northwest of the Bellows Falls central business district. It is a 18 by 31 feet (5.5 by 9.4 m) wide barrel-roofed metal structure, retaining the original varnished wood walls, enamel panels, a polychrome tile floor, oak booths with Formica table tops, and a main counter with marble and metal finish. The kitchen and bathroom facilities are in a wood-frame addition to the rear. The original enamel panels bearing the diner's name are still in use.

It was constructed in 1941 by the Worcester Lunch Car Company as #771, and is the only known example of a Worcester barrel-roofed diner in the state that is still intact. It was originally built for John Korsak and Frank Willie for use in Lowell, Massachusetts, where it was called Frankie & Johnny's. Both Korsak and Willie were called up into the military for World War II, and the diner was sold to go to Bellows Falls, where it arrived on May 14, 1944, replacing an earlier diner on the site.

It was listed on the National Register of Historic Places in 1983. The National Register application incorrectly states this diner was assembled "probably in the 1930s", but its model number (#771) indicates 1941. The Rosebud (diner) in Somerville, Massachusetts, Worcester #773, was also built in 1941, and Worcester serialized their diners consecutively in order of production.

== Demographics ==
Historical population
Census	Pop.	Note	%±
1870	697		—
1880	2,229		219.8%
1890	3,092		38.7%
1900	4,337		40.3%
1910	4,883		12.6%
1920	4,860		−0.5%
1930	3,930		−19.1%
1940	4,236		7.8%
1950	3,881		−8.4%
1960	3,831		−1.3%
1970	3,505		−8.5%
1980	3,456		−1.4%
1990	3,313		−4.1%
2000	3,165		−4.5%
2010	3,148		−0.5%
2020	2,747		−12.7%
U.S. Decennial Census

As of the census of 2000, there were 3,165 people, 1,329 households, and 782 families residing in the village. The population density was 2,286.1 people per square mile (885.5/km^{2}). There were 1,443 housing units at an average density of 1,042.3/sq mi (403.7/km^{2}). The racial makeup of the village was 97.28% White, 0.35% African American, 0.16% Native American, 0.51% Asian, 0.03% Pacific Islander, 0.22% from other races, and 1.45% from two or more races. Hispanic or Latino of any race were 1.14% of the population.

There were 1,329 households, out of which 32.2% had children under the age of 18 living with them, 40.0% were couples living together and joined in either marriage or civil union, 14.1% had a female householder with no husband present, and 41.1% were non-families. 34.5% of all households were made up of individuals, and 16.7% had someone living alone who was 65 years of age or older. The average household size was 2.35 and the average family size was 3.01.

In the village, the population was spread out, with 26.1% under the age of 18, 7.8% from 18 to 24, 28.3% from 25 to 44, 21.5% from 45 to 64, and 16.2% who were 65 years of age or older. The median age was 37 years. For every 100 females, there were 94.1 males. For every 100 females age 18 and over, there were 88.6 males.

The median income for a household in the village was $29,608, and the median income for a family was $45,688. Males had a median income of $29,137 versus $22,340 for females. The per capita income for the village was $15,276. About 5.6% of families and 12.6% of the population were below the poverty line, including 14.3% of those under age 18 and 15.9% of those age 65 or over.

== Notable people ==
- Donald H. Balch — United States Air Force general
- Colleen Barrett — Former president of Southwest Airlines
- Mark Brown — American baseball player
- E. William Crotty — American diplomat
- Donald E. Edwards — American state military officer
- John R. Edwards, member of the Vermont House of Representatives and US Marshal for Vermont
- Carlton Fisk — American baseball player
- Robert Gillis — American college football coach
- Jay H. Gordon — American politician
- Warner A. Graham – American judge (1884–1934)
- Hetty Green — American businesswoman and financier
- James F. Howard Jr. — Professor of neurology
- Bruce M. Lawlor — Retired United States Army officer
- Israel Lund — Conceptual painter
- Guy McPherson — scientist
- Michael J. Obuchowski — Former member of the Vermont House of Representatives
- Roger Robb — American judge
- Thomas M. Salmon — Vermont Auditor of Accounts from 2007 to 2013
- Thomas P. Salmon — Governor of Vermont from 1973 to 1977
- Jennie Maria Arms Sheldon — American author, scientist and researcher
- Gary Smith — American businessman
- Ernest Thompson — American writer, actor, and director
- Matt Trieber — American politician
- Rick Veitch — American comics artist and writer
- Asa Wentworth Jr. — American politician

== Gallery ==
Bellows Falls
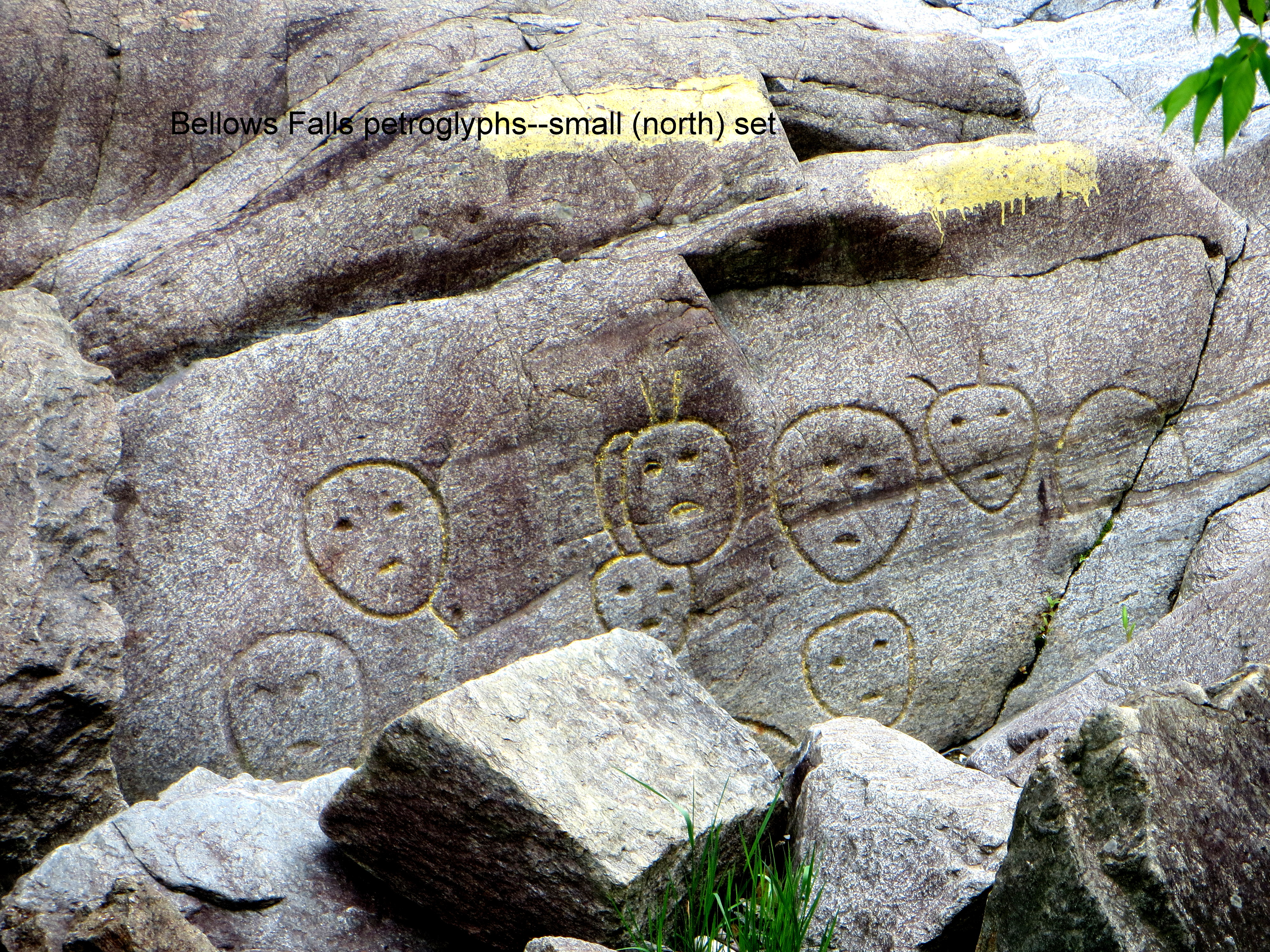
Close up of the Bellows Falls Petroglyph Site (2014)

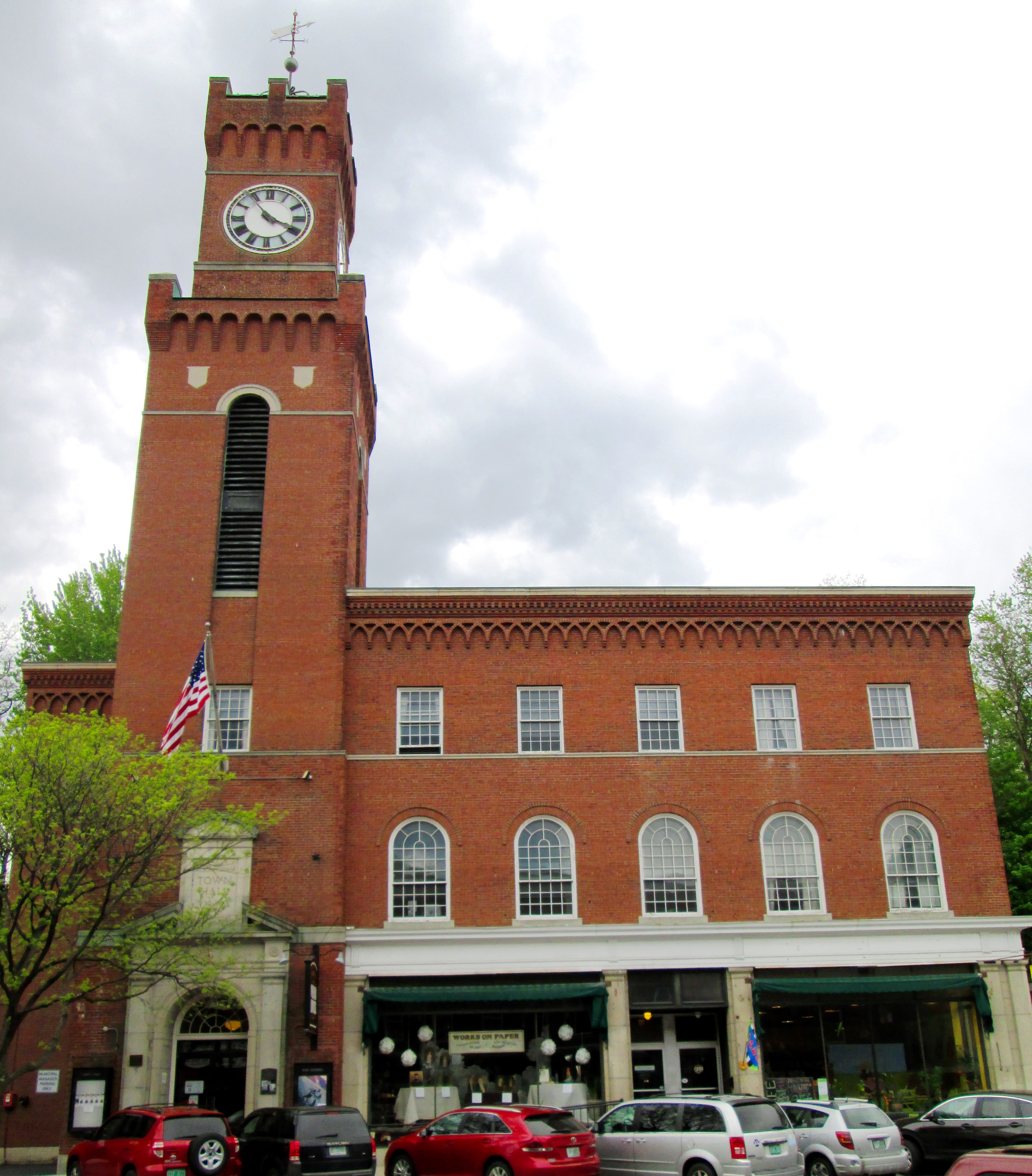
Rockingham Town Hall, which holds the Opera House, was built in 1926 on The Square, and is part of the Bellows Falls Downtown Historic District, designated in 1982.

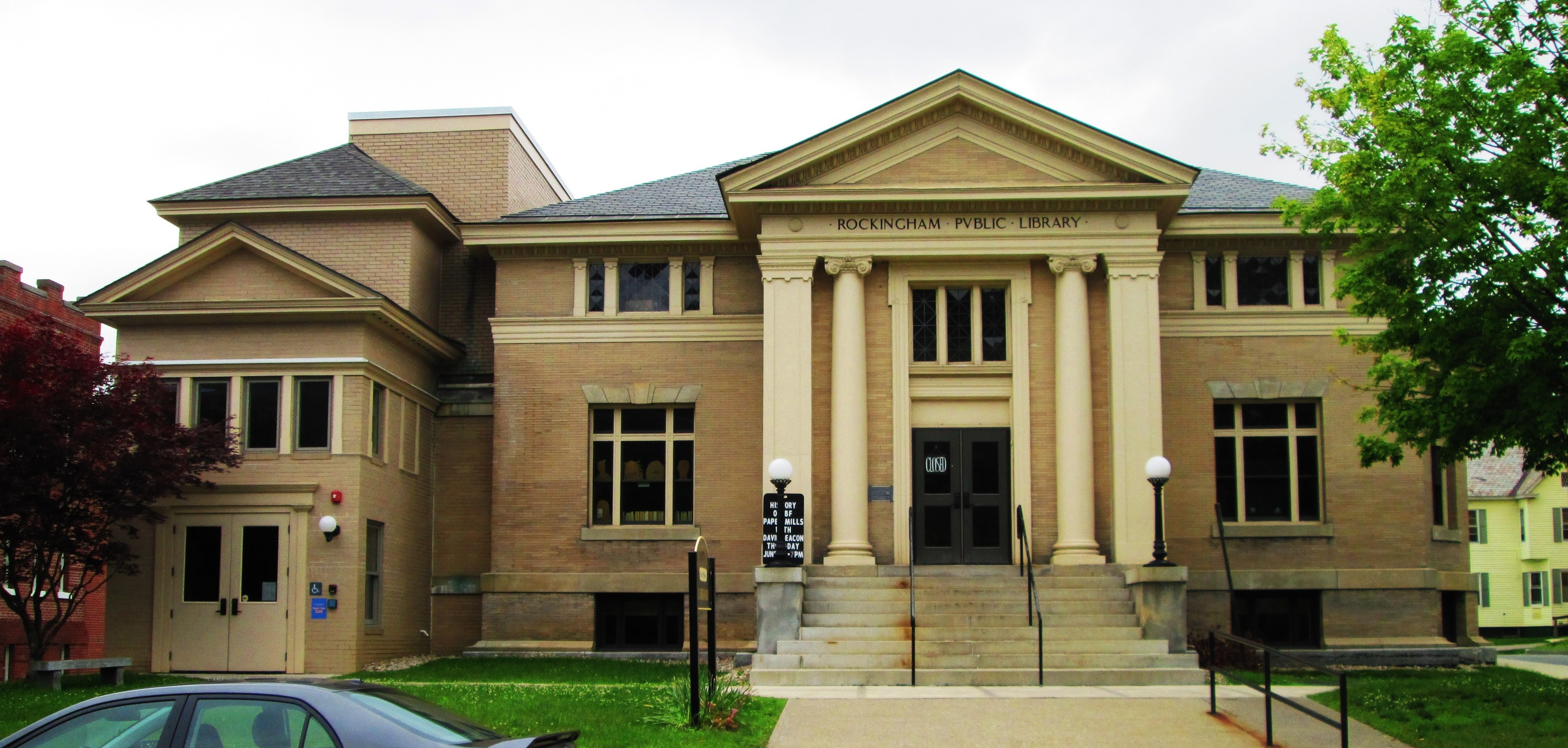
Rockingham Public Library, a Carnegie library built in 1909

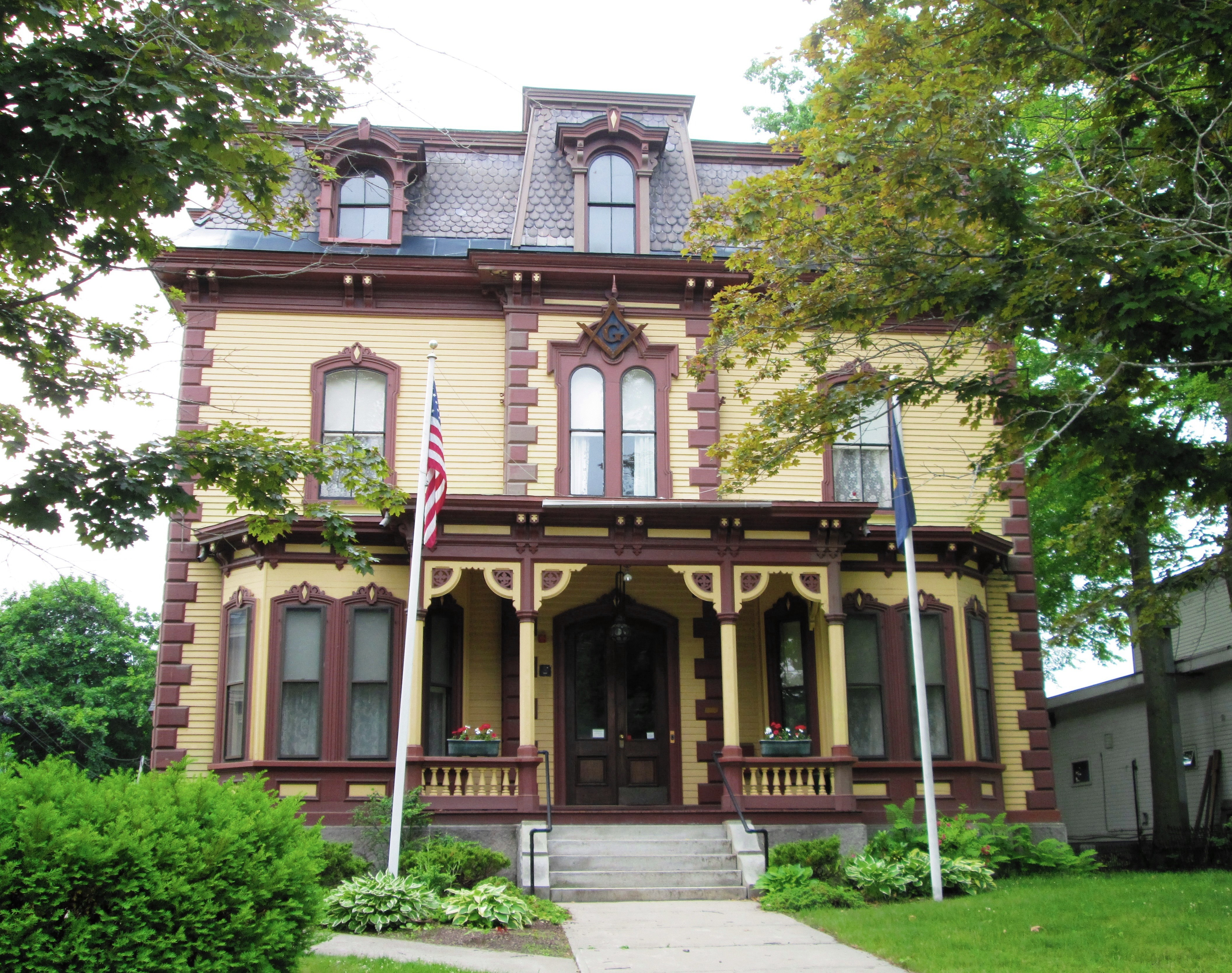
The Bellows Falls Masonic Temple, formerly the Wyman & Almira Flint House, was built c.1870 in the Second Empire style

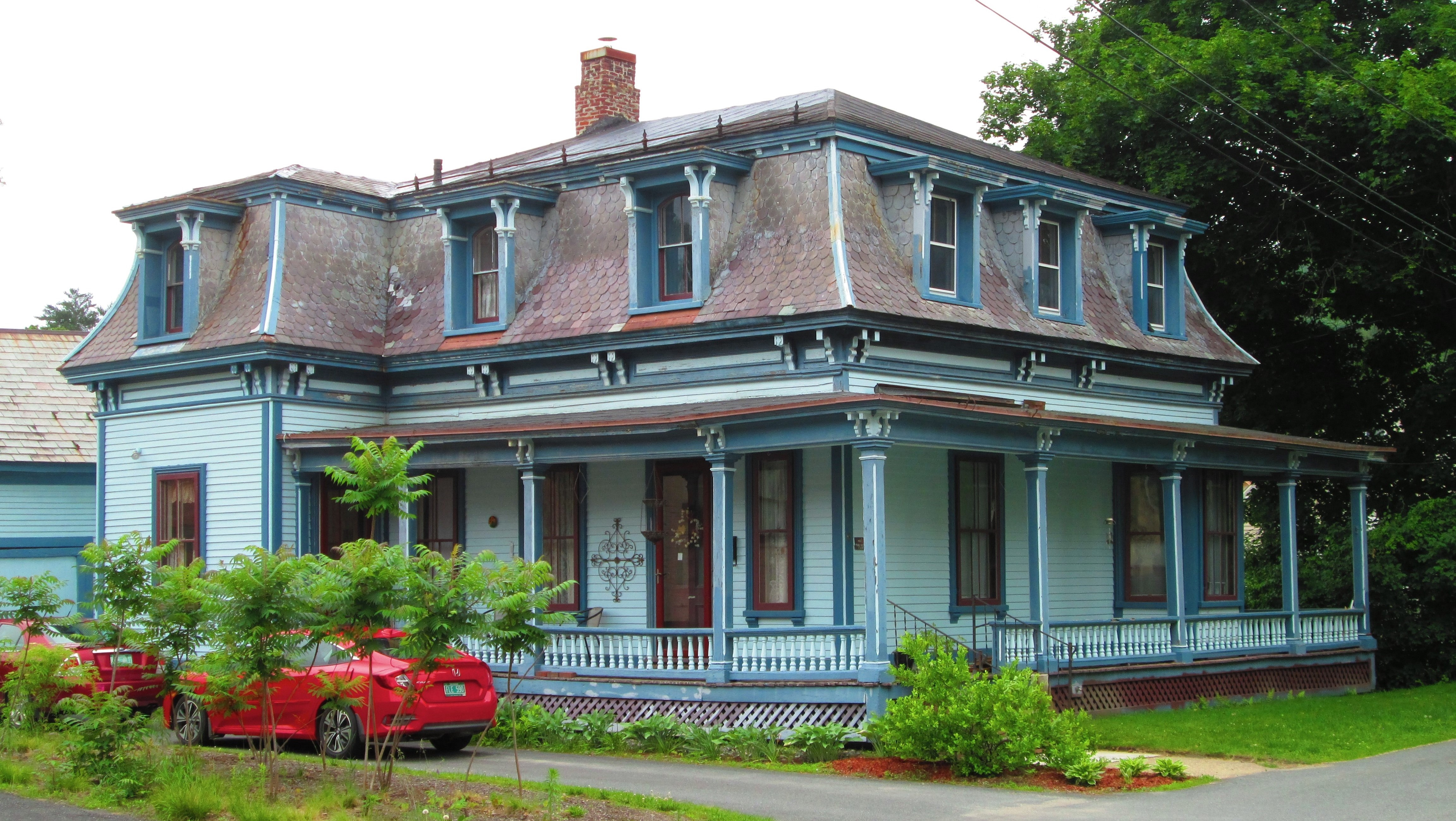
A Victorian house at 6 Temple Street

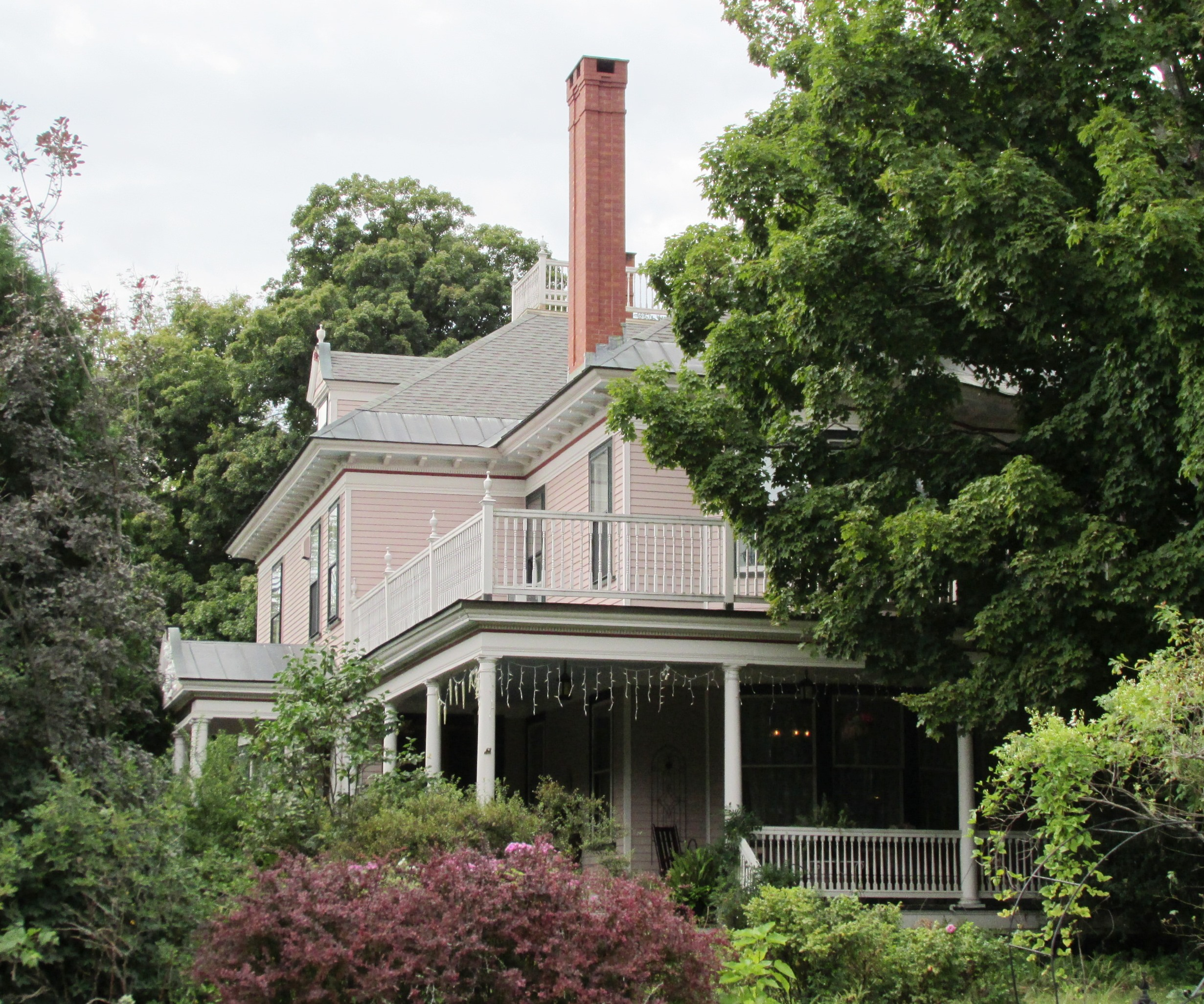
The William A. Hall House was built in 1890–92 in the Colonial Revival stye.

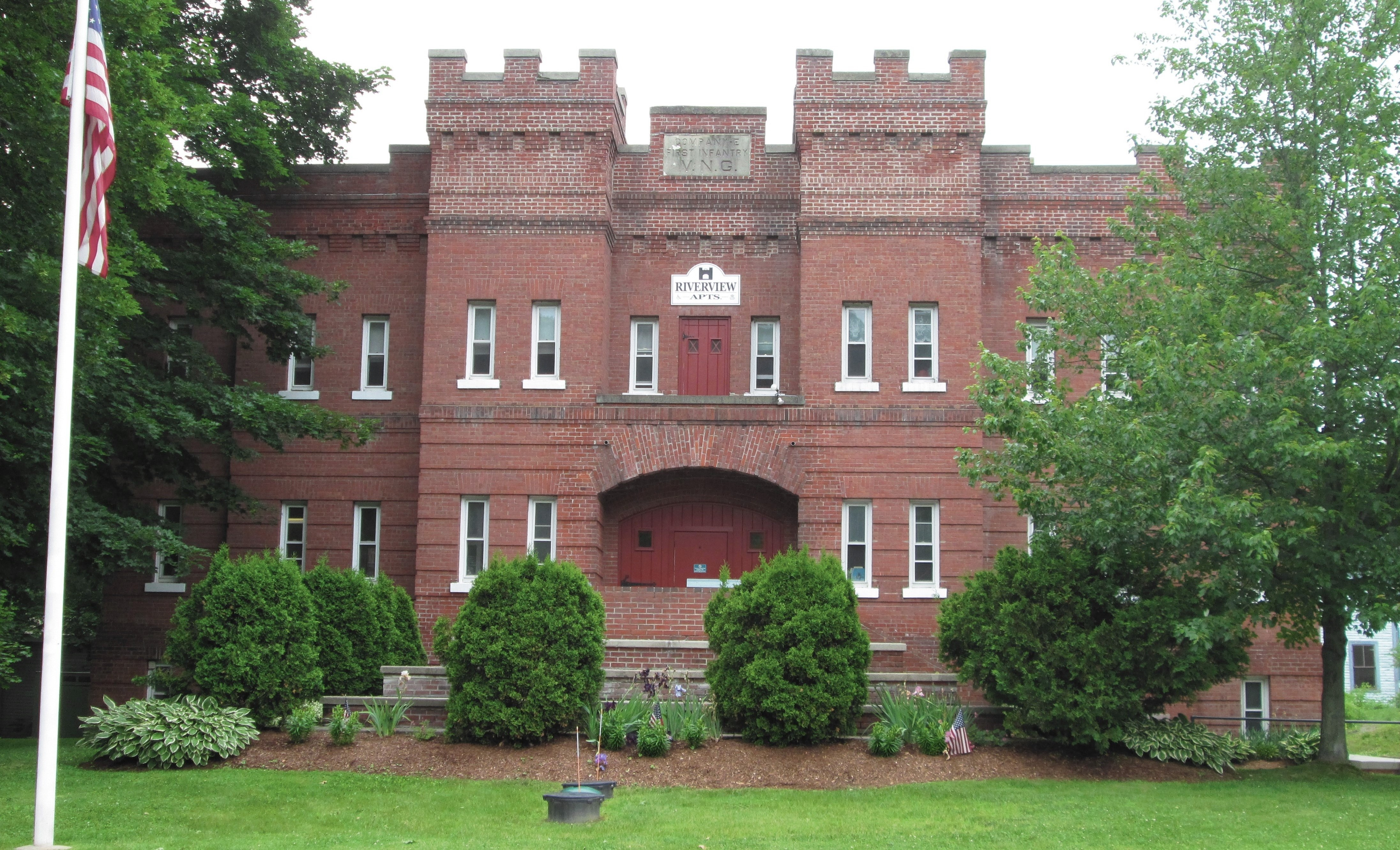
The former armory of Company E of the First Infantry of the Vermont National Guard

== See also ==
- Arch Bridge (Bellows Falls)
- National Register of Historic Places listings in Windham County, Vermont
- Steamtown, U.S.A.
