= Dougga =

Archaeological site in Tunisia

Dougga/Thugga
- دڨة "Dougga" (Tunisian) 𐤕𐤁𐤂𐤂 (Punic) THUGGA (Latin)
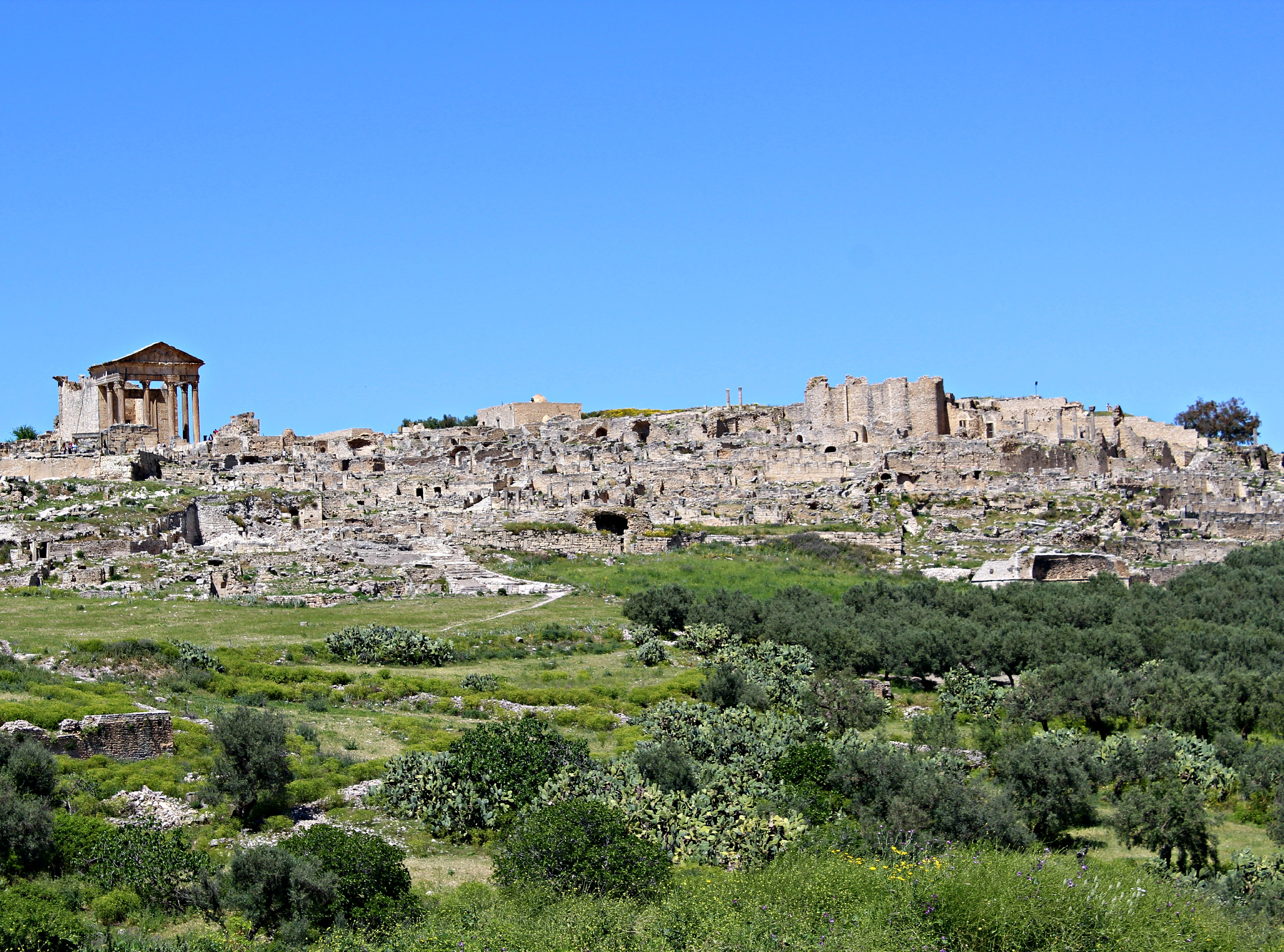
- Dougga
- Interactive map of Dougga/Thugga
- 36°25′20″N 9°13′6″E
- Type: Settlement
- Periods: Numidian to Roman Empire
- Cultures: Numidian-Berber; Punic; Roman Africans; Byzantine; Vandals
- Location: Béja Governorate, Tunisia

History
- Built: 6th century BC

Site notes
- Area: 75 ha (190 acres)

UNESCO World Heritage Site
- Official name: Dougga/Thugga
- Type: Cultural
- Criteria: ii, iii
- Designated: 1997 (21st session)
- Reference no.: 794
- Region: Arab States

Dougga or Thugga or TBGG (Arabic: دقة, romanized: Duqqah; Tunisian Arabic: دڨة, romanized: Dugga) was a Berber, Punic and Roman settlement near present-day Téboursouk in northern Tunisia. The current archaeological site covers 75 hectares (190 acres). UNESCO qualified Dougga as a World Heritage Site in 1997, believing that it represents "the best-preserved Roman small town in North Africa". The site, which lies in the middle of the countryside, has been protected from the encroachment of modern urbanization, in contrast, for example, to Carthage, which has been pillaged and rebuilt on numerous occasions. Dougga's size, its well-preserved monuments and its rich Numidian-Berber, Punic, ancient Roman, and Byzantine history make it exceptional. Amongst the most famous monuments at the site are a Libyco-Punic Mausoleum, the Capitol, the Roman theatre, and the temples of Saturn and of Juno Caelestis.

== Names ==
The Numidian name of the settlement was recorded in the Libyco-Berber alphabet as TBGG. The Punic name of the settlement is recorded as tbgg (𐤕𐤁𐤂𐤂) and tbgʿg (𐤕𐤁𐤂𐤏𐤂). The Root B GG in Phoenician means ("in the roof terrace"). Camps states that this may represent a borrowing of a Berber word derived from the root tbg ("to protect"). This evidently derives from the site's position atop an easily defensible plateau. The name was borrowed into Latin as Thugga. Once it was granted "free status", it was formally refounded and known as Municipium Septimium Aurelium Liberum Thugga; "Septimium" and "Aurelium" are references to the "new" town's "founders" (conditores), Septimius Severus and M. Aurelius Antoninus (i.e., Caracalla). For treatment of liberum, see below. Once Dougga received the status of a Roman colony, it was formally known as Colonia Licinia Septimia Aurelia Alexandriana Thuggensis.

In present-day Berber, it is known as either Dugga or Tugga. That was borrowed into Arabic: دڨة or دقة and Dougga is a French transcription of this Arabic name.

== Location ==
Dougga's location in Roman Africa.

The archaeological site is located 4.6 km (2.9 mi) SSW of the modern town of Téboursouk on a plateau with an uninhibited view of the surrounding plains in the Oued Khalled. The site offers a high degree of natural protection, which helps to explain its early occupation. The slope on which Dougga is built rises to the north and is bordered in the east by the cliff known as Kef Dougga. Further to the east, the ridge of the Fossa Regia, a ditch and boundary made by the Romans after the destruction of Carthage, indicates Dougga's position as a point of contact between the Punic and Berber worlds.

== History ==
Dougga's history is best known from the time of the Roman conquest, even though numerous pre-Roman monuments, including a necropolis, a mausoleum, and several temples have been discovered during archaeological digs. These monuments are an indication of the site's importance before the arrival of the Romans.

=== Berber Kingdom ===
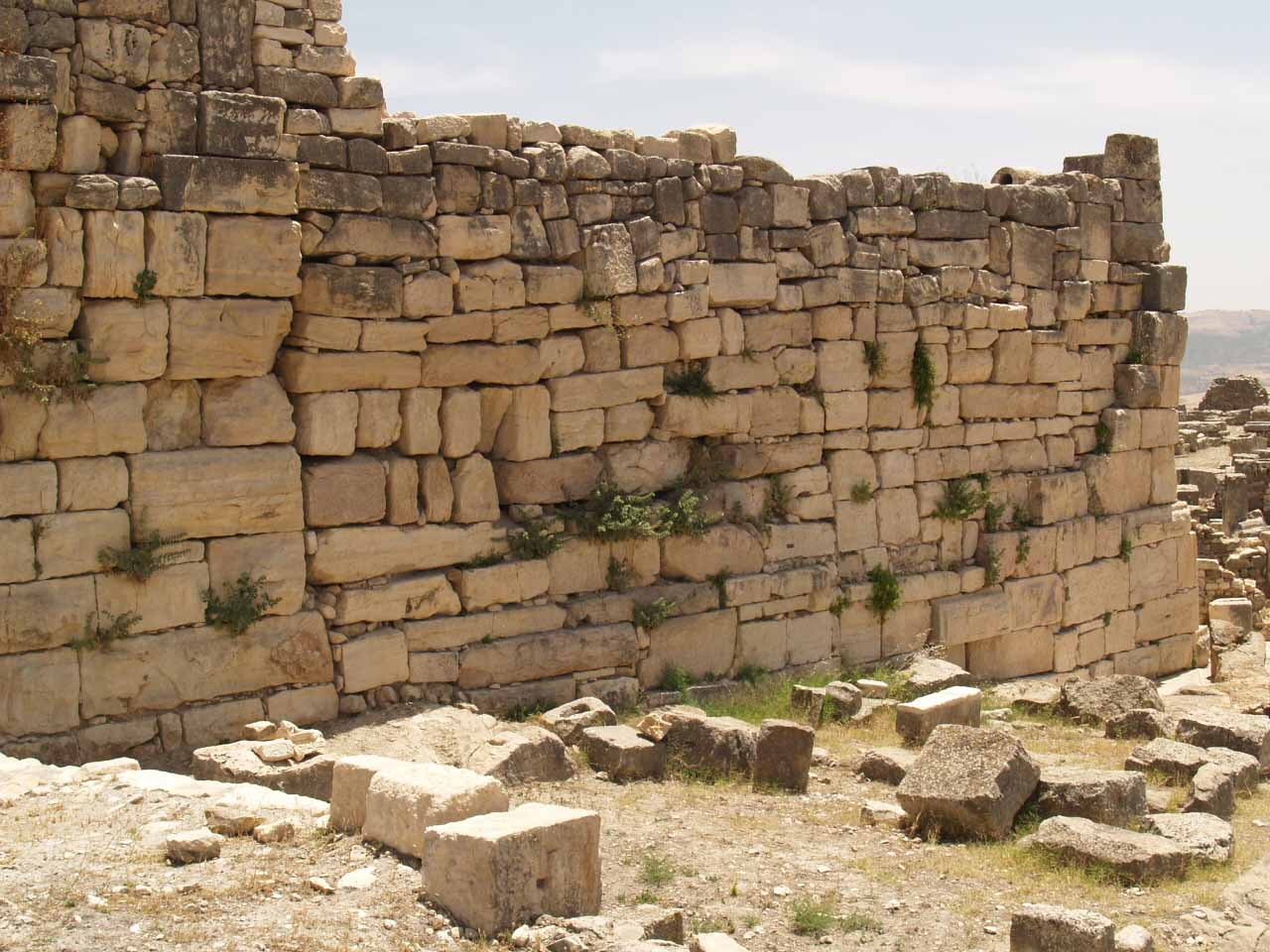
Remains of the walls built in Late Antiquity, once believed to be Numidian fortifications

The city appears to have been founded in the 6th century BC. Some historians believe that Dougga is the city of Tocae (Ancient Greek: Τοκαί, Tokaí), which was captured by a lieutenant of Agathocles of Syracuse at the end of the 4th century BC; Diodorus of Sicily described Tocae as "a city of beautiful grandeur".

Dougga was in any case an early and important human settlement. Its urban character is evidenced by the presence of a necropolis with dolmens, the most ancient archaeological find at Dougga, a sanctuary dedicated to Ba'al Hammon, neo-Punic steles, a mausoleum, architectural fragments, and a temple dedicated to Masinissa, the remains of which were found during archaeological excavations. Even though our knowledge of the city before the Roman conquest remains very limited, recent archaeological finds have revolutionized the image that we had of this period.

The identification of the temple dedicated to Masinissa beneath the forum disproved Louis Poinssot's theory that the Numidian city stood on the plateau but that it was separate from the newer Roman settlement. The temple, which was erected in the tenth year of Micipsa's reign (139 BC), is 14 m × 6.3 m (46 ft × 21 ft) wide. It proves that the area around the forum was already built upon before the arrival of the Roman colonists. A building dating to the 2nd century BC has also been discovered nearby. Similarly, Dougga's mausoleum is not isolated but stands within an urban necropolis.

Recent finds have disproved earlier theories about the so-called "Numidian walls". The walls around Dougga are in fact not Numidian; they are part of the city's fortifications erected in late antiquity. Targeted digs have also proven that what had been interpreted as two Numidian towers in the walls are in fact two funeral monuments from the Numidian era reused much later as foundations and a section of defences.

The discovery of Libyan and Punic inscriptions at the site provoked a debate on the administration of the city at the time of the Kingdom of Numidia. The debate—about the interpretation of epigraphic sources—focussed on the question of whether the city was still under Punic influence or whether it was increasingly Berber. Local Berber institutions distinct from any form of Punic authority arose from the Numidian period onwards, but Camps notes that Punic shofets were still in place in several cities, including Dougga, during the Roman era, which is a sign of continuing Punic influence and the preservation of certain elements of Punic civilization well after the fall of Carthage.

=== Roman Empire ===
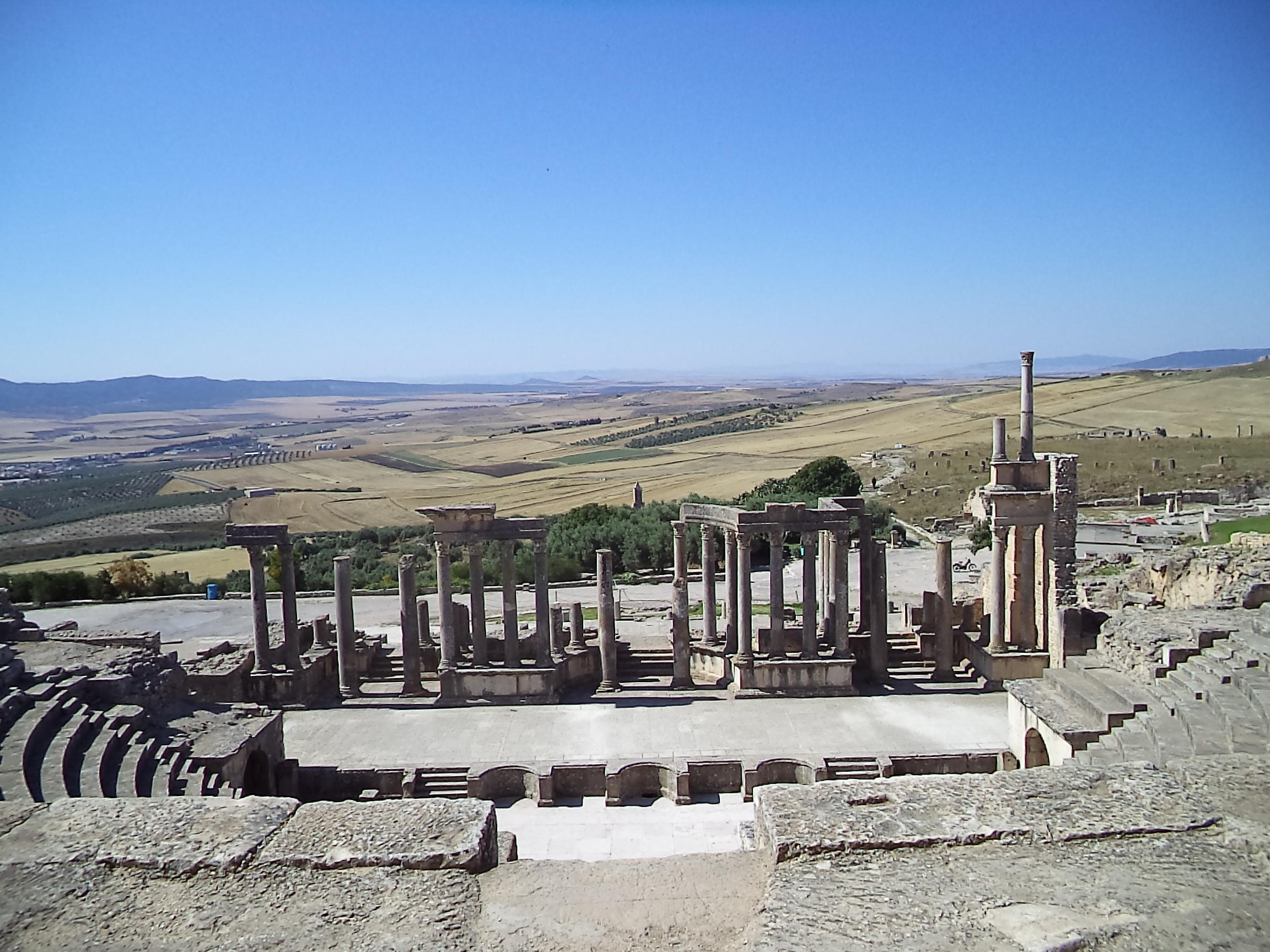
Dougga Theater

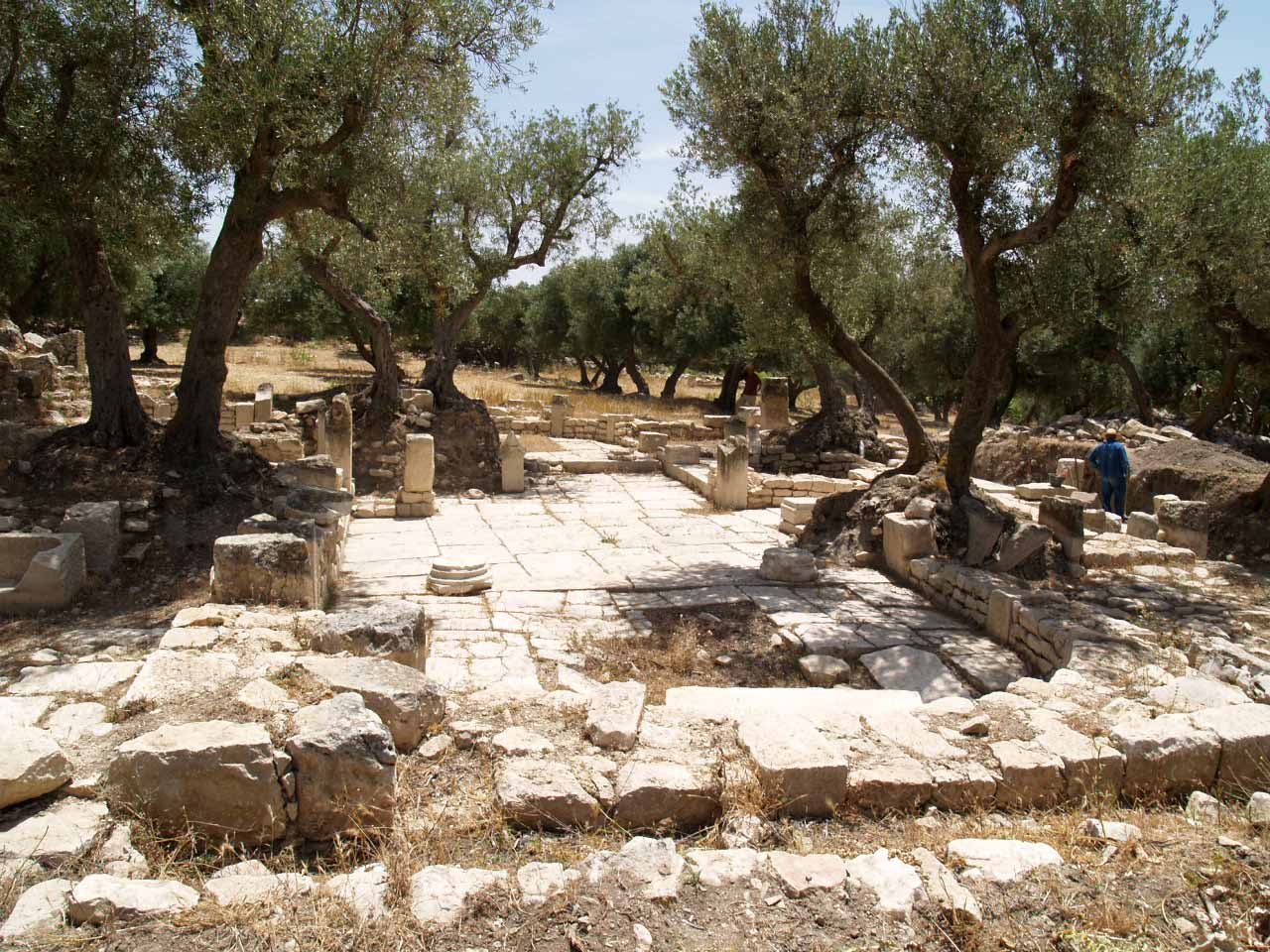
Ruins amongst Dougga's olive trees

The Romans granted Dougga the status of an indigenous city (Latin: civitas) following their conquest of the region.

The creation of the colony of Carthage during the reign of Augustus complicated Dougga's institutional status. The city was included in the territory (pertica) of the Roman colony, but around this time, a community (pagus) of Roman colonists also arose alongside the existing settlement. For two centuries, the site was thus governed by two civic and institutional bodies: the city with its peregrini and the pagus with its Roman citizens. Both had Roman civic institutions: magistrates and a council (ordo) of decurions for the city, a local council from the end of the 1st century AD, and local administrators for the pagus, who were legally subordinated to the distant but powerful colony of Carthage. In addition, epigraphic evidence indicates that a Punic-style dual magistracy, the sufetes, achieved some civic stature here well into the imperial period. In fact, the city once had three magistrates serve at once, a relative rarity in the Mediterranean.

Over time, the romanization of the city brought the two communities closer together. Notable members of the peregrini increasingly adopted Roman culture and behavior, became Roman citizens, and the councils of the two communities began to take decisions in unison. The increasing closeness of the communities was facilitated at first by their geographic proximity—there was no physical distinction between their two settlements—and then later by institutional arrangements. During the reign of Marcus Aurelius, the city was granted Roman law; from this moment onward, the magistrates automatically received Roman citizenship and the rights of the city's inhabitants became similar to those of the Roman citizens. During the same era, the pagus won a certain degree of autonomy from Carthage; it was able to receive bequests and administer public funds.

Nonetheless, it was not until AD 205, during the reign of Septimius Severus, that the two communities came together as one municipality (municipium), made "free" (see below) while Carthage's pertica was reduced. The city was supported by the euergetism of its great families of wealthy individuals, which sometimes reached exorbitant levels, while its interests were successfully represented by appeals to the emperors. Dougga's development culminated during the reign of Gallienus, when it obtained the status of a separate Roman colony.

Dougga's monuments attest to its prosperity in the period from the reign of Diocletian to that of Theodosius I, but it fell into a sort of stupor from the 4th century. The city appears to have experienced an early decline, as evidenced by the relatively poor remains of Christianity. The period of Byzantine rule saw the area around the forum transformed into a fort; several important buildings were destroyed in order to provide the necessary materials for its construction.

=== Caliphate ===
Dougga was never completely abandoned following the Muslim invasions of the area. For a long time, Dougga remained the site of a small village populated by the descendants of the city's former inhabitants, as evidenced by the small mosque situated in the Temple of August Piety and the small bath dating to the Aghlabid period on the southern flank of the forum.

=== Archaeological work ===
The first Western visitors to have left eyewitness accounts of the ruins reached the site in the 17th century. This trend continued in the 18th century and at the start of the 19th century. The best-preserved monuments, including the mausoleum, were described and, at the end of this period, were the object of architectural studies.

The establishment of France's Tunisian protectorate in 1881 led to the creation of a national antiquities institute (French: Institut national du patrimoine), for which the excavation of the site at Dougga was a priority from 1901, parallel to the works carried out at Carthage. The works at Dougga concentrated at first on the area around the forum; other discoveries ensured that there was an almost constant series of digs at the site until 1939. Alongside these excavations, work was conducted to restore the capitol, of which only the front and the base of the wall of the cella were still standing, and to restore the mausoleum, particularly between 1908 and 1910 .

After Tunisia's independence, other buildings were excavated, including the Temple of Caracalla's Victory in Germany. During the same period, the last inhabitants of the site were evicted and relocated to a village located on the plain several kilometers from the antique site, which is named New Dougga. In 1991, the decision was taken to make the site into a national archaeological park. A cooperative scientific programme aims in particular to promote the study of the inscriptions at the site and the pagan temples. In 1997, Dougga was added to the UNESCO list of World Heritage Sites.

Despite its importance and its exceptional state, Dougga remains off the beaten track for many tourists and receives only about 50,000 visitors per year. In order to make it more attractive, the construction of an on-site museum is being considered, while the national antiquities institute has established a website presenting the site and the surrounding region.

== Dougga's "Liberty" ==
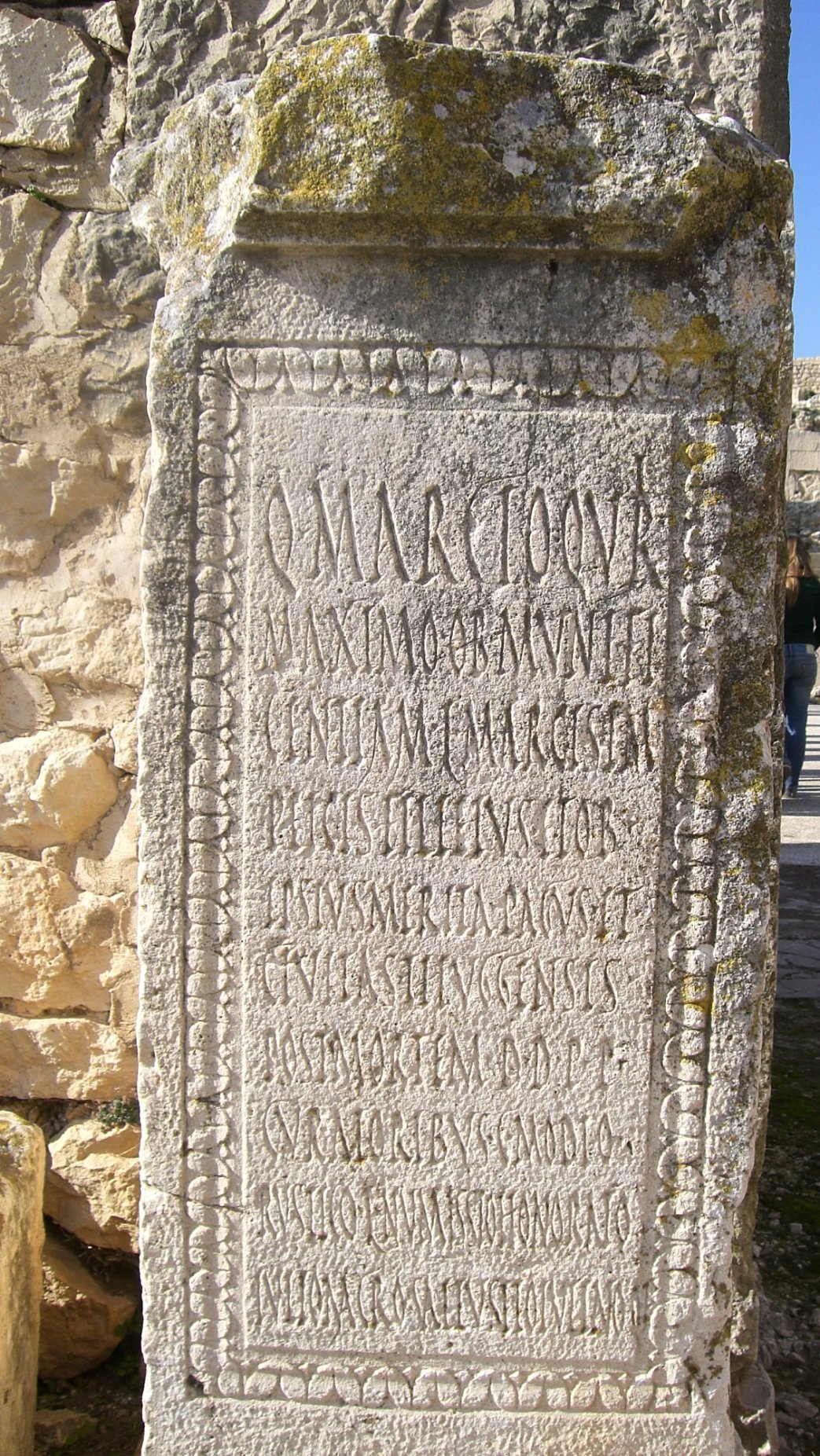
Inscription in honor of Marcius Maximus erected jointly by the pagus and the civitas.

From AD 205, when the city (civitas) and community (pagus) fused into one municipality (municipium), Dougga bore the title liberum, whose significance is not immediately clear. The term appears in the titles of a certain number of other municipia also founded at the same time: Thibursicum Bure, Aulodes, and Thysdrus. Several interpretations of its meaning have been suggested. According to Merlin and Poinssot, the term derives from the name of the god Liber, in whose honor a temple was erected at Dougga. The epithet Liberum would thus follow the same pattern as Frugifer and Concordia, which appear in the title of Thibursicum Bure. Thibursicum Bure is however an exception to the rule; the titles of the other municipia including the term liberum do not include the names of any divinities, and this hypothesis has therefore been abandoned. Alternatively, liberum is taken as a reference to free status (libertas, "liberty"). This interpretation is confirmed by an inscription found at Dougga that honors Alexander Severus as the "preserver of liberty" (conservator libertatis).

It is, however, unclear exactly what form this liberty took. Toutain is of the opinion that this is a designation for a particular type of municipium—free cities where the Roman governor did not have the right to control the municipal magistrates. There is however no evidence that Dougga enjoyed exceptional legal privileges of the type associated with certain free cities such as Aphrodisias in Asia Minor. Veyne has thus suggested that Dougga's "freedom" is nothing but an expression of the concept of liberty without any legal meaning; obtaining the status of a municipium had freed the city of its subjugation and enabled it to adorn itself with the "ornaments of liberty" (ornamenta libertatis). The city's liberty was celebrated just as its dignity was extolled; the emperor Probus is a "preserver of liberty and dignity" (conservator libertatis et dignitatis). Gascou, in line with Veyne's interpretation, describes the situation thus: "Liberum, in Thugga's title, is a term [...] with which the city, which had waited a long time for the status of a municipium, is happy to flatter itself".

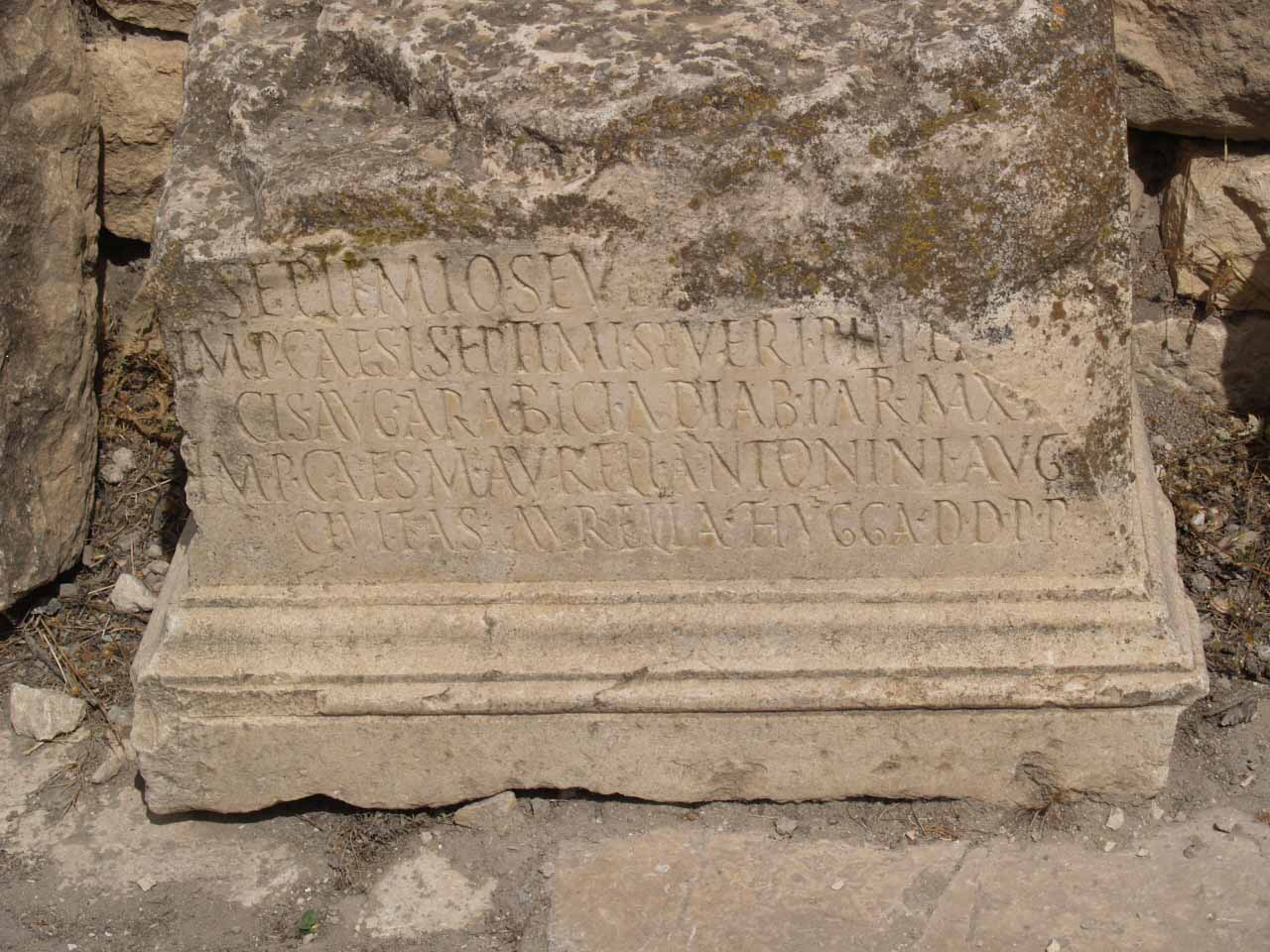
Inscription erected by the civitas shortly before the fusion with the pagus. Inscriptions such as this one are practically the only record we have of the city's institutions.

Despite Gascou's conclusion, efforts have been made more recently to identify concrete aspects of Dougga's liberty. Lepelley believes on the one hand that this must be a reference to the relations between the city and Rome and on the other hand that the term can cover a range of diverse privileges of differing degrees. It is known that the territory of Carthage, to which the Dougga pagus belonged until AD 205, enjoyed such privileges: the inhabitants of the pagus even sent an appeal during Trajan's reign to defend the fiscal immunity of the territory of Carthage (immunitas perticae Carthaginiensium). The Dougga civitas had not been granted this concession, so the fusion of pagus with the civitas meant that the citizens of the pagus risked losing their enviable privilege. The liberty of the municipia founded during the reign of Septimius Severus could thus be a reference to the fiscal immunity made possible by the region's great wealth and by the emperor's generosity to each municipium at the time of its fusion. During the reign of Gallienus, a certain Aulus Vitellius Felix Honoratus, a well-known individual in Dougga, made an appeal to the emperor "in order to assure the public liberty". Lepelley believes that this is an indication that the city's privilege had been called into question, although Dougga appears to have been at least partially able to preserve its concessions, as evidenced by an inscription to the honor of "Probus, defender of its liberty".

According to Christol though, this interpretation overly restricts the meaning of the word libertas. In Christol's view, it is important not to forget that the emperor's decision in 205 must have been taken in response to a request made by the civitas and must have taken account of the relations that already existed between it and the pagus. It was the autonomy that the civitas had achieved during the reign of Marcus Aurelius and the granting of Roman law that raised the specter of a fusion of the two communities, which would without a doubt have provoked a certain unease in the pagus. The inhabitants of the pagus would have expressed "concern or even refusal when faced with the pretensions of their closest neighbors". This would explain the honor that the pagus attributed to Commodus (conservator pagi, "protector of the community").

For Christol, the term liberum must be understood in this context and in an abstract sense. This liberty derives from belonging to a city and expresses the end of the civitas's dependence, "the elevation of a community of peregrini to the liberty of Roman citizenship", which also served to placate the fears of the inhabitants of the pagus and to open the door to a later promotion, to the status of a colony. This promotion took place in AD 261, during the reign of Gallienus, following an appeal from Aulus Vitellius Felix Honoratus in Christol's version of events. Thereafter, the defence of the libertas publica was not a question of defending a privilege at risk, but of requesting the "ultimate liberty" (summa libertas)—the promotion to the status of a colony. Christol also points out that, despite the abstract character of terms such as libertas or dignitas, their formal appearance should be references to concrete and unique events.

== General layout ==
Map of the area around the forum To the east, from the north to the south, are the Temple of Mercury and the Temple of August Piety, the "square of the Rose of the Winds" and the market; to the west, the western square with the capitol and immediately to the left of the capitol, the substructures of the Temple of Massinissa; in grey, the outline of the Byzantine fort

The city as it exists today consists essentially of remains from the Roman era dating for the most part to the 2nd and 3rd century. The Roman builders had to take account both of the site's particularly craggy terrain and of earlier constructions, which led them to abandon the normal layout of Roman settlements, as is also particularly evident in places such as Timgad.

Recent archaeological digs have confirmed the continuity in the city's urban development. The heart of the city has always been at the top of the hill, where the forum replaced the Numidian agora. As Dougga developed, urban construction occupied the side of the hill, so that the city must have resembled "a compact mass", according to Hédi Slim

Early archaeological digs concentrated on public buildings, which meant that private buildings tended at first to be uncovered at the ends of the trenches dug for this purpose. Later, trenches were cut with the purpose of exposing particularly characteristic private buildings.

=== Numidian residence ===
Traces of a residence dating to the Numidian era have been identified in the foundations of the temple dedicated to Liber. Although these traces are very faint, they served to disprove the theories of the first archaeologists, including Louis Poinssot, that the Roman and pre-Roman settlements were located on separate sites. The two settlements evidently overlapped.

=== The trifolium villa ===
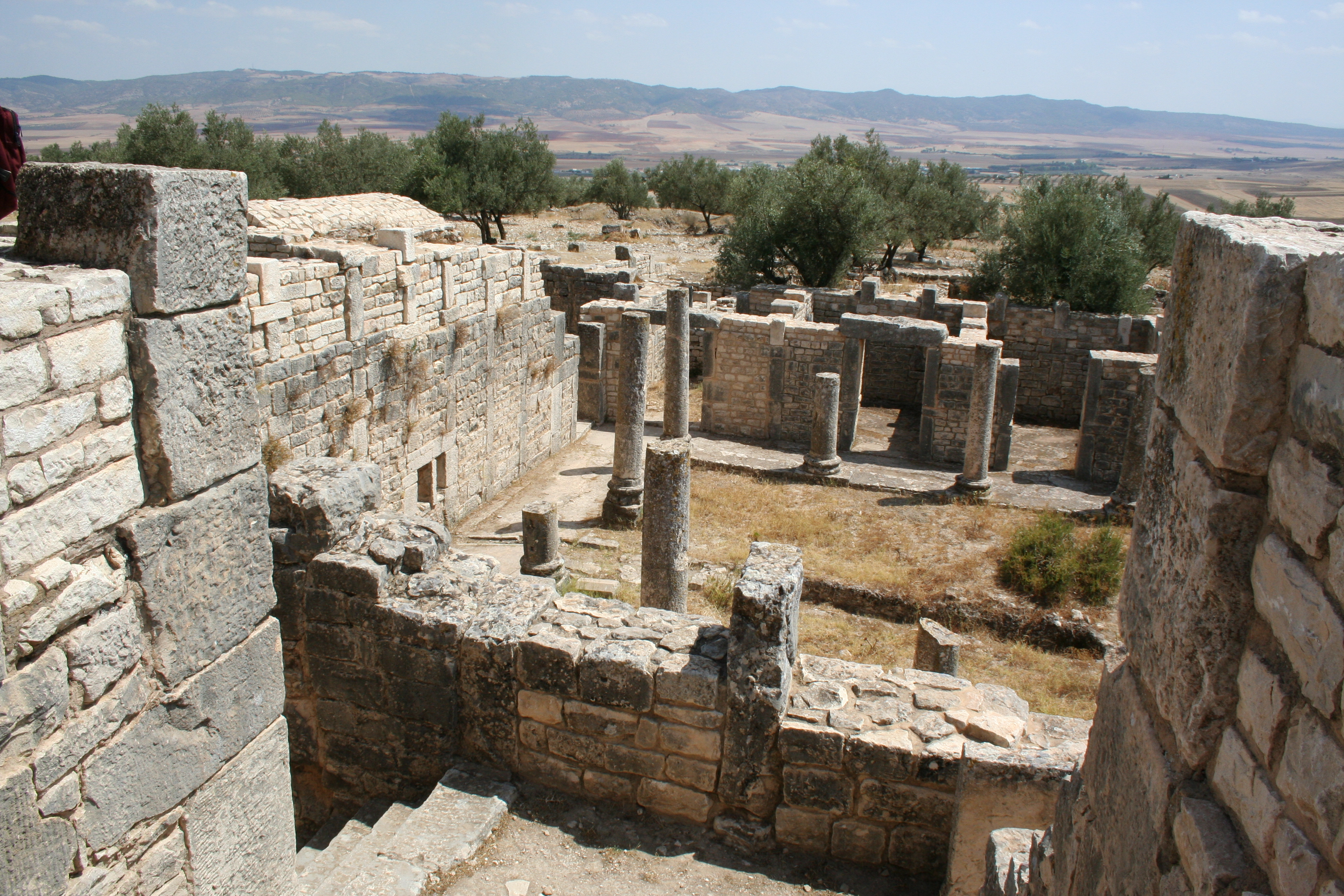
The courtyard of the trifolium villa.

This residence, which dates to the 2nd or 3rd century, stands downhill from the quarters that surround the forum and the principal public monuments in the city, in an area where the streets are winding.

The trifolium villa, named after a clover-shaped room that was without a doubt used as a triclinium, is the largest private house excavated so far at Dougga. The house had two storeys, but there is almost nothing left of the upper storey. It stands in the south of the city, halfway up the hill. The house is particularly interesting because of the way in which it is built to align with the lay of the land; the entrance hall slopes down to a courtyard around which the various rooms were arranged.

=== The market ===
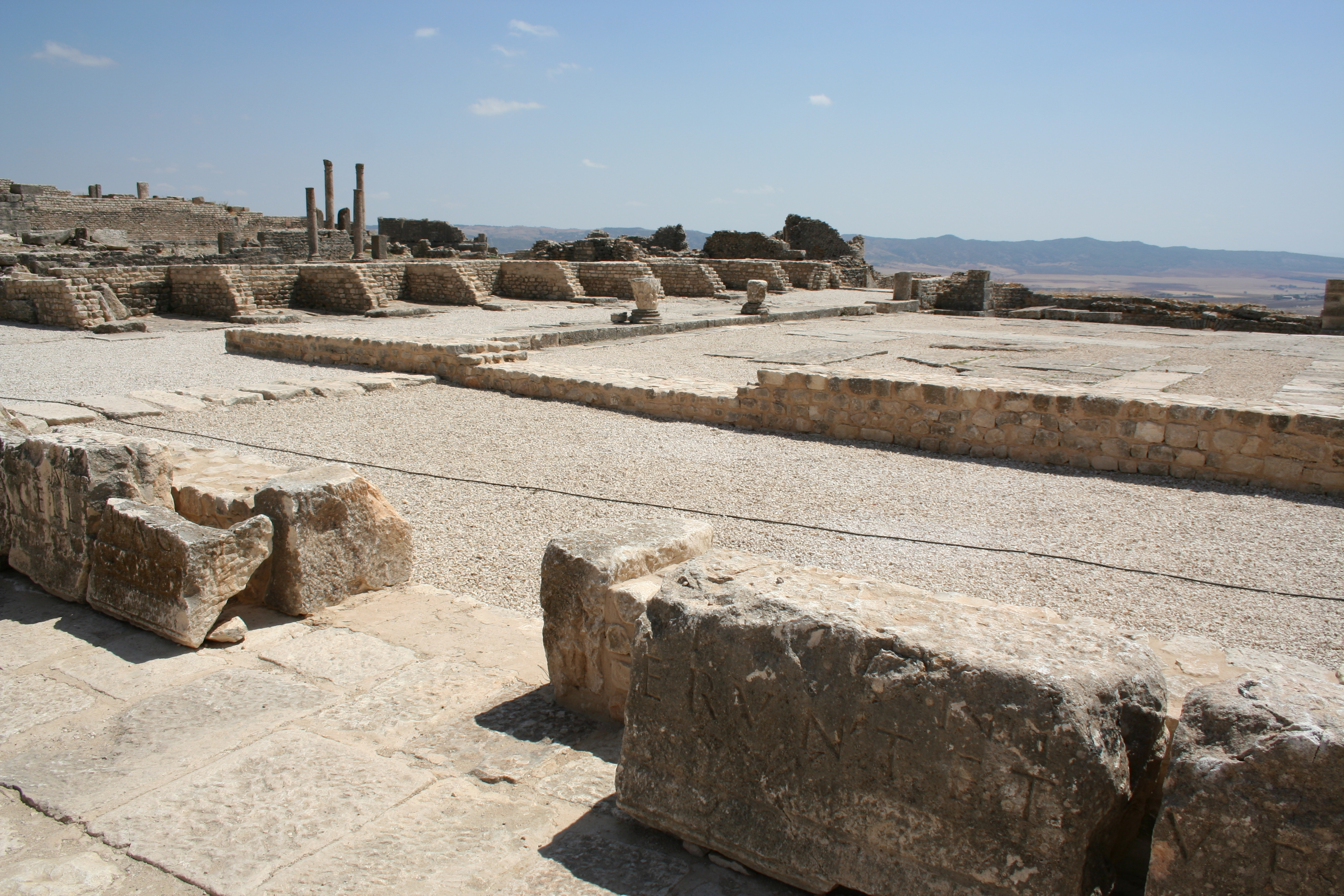
The remains of the market

The market dates from the middle of the 1st century. It took the form of a square 35.5 m × 28 m (116 ft × 92 ft) in size, surrounded by a portico and shops on two sides. The northern side had a portico, while an exedra occupied the southern side. The exedra probably housed a statue of Mercury.

In order to compensate for the natural incline of the ground on which the market stands, its builders undertook significant earthworks. These earthworks have been dated as being amongst the oldest Roman constructions, and their orientation vis-à-vis the forum seems to suggest that they were not built on any earlier foundations. The modern-day location of the remains from the market near the forum should however not be misunderstood as indicating a link between the two. The market was almost completely destroyed during the construction of the Byzantine fort. It was excavated in 1918–1919.

=== Licinian Baths ===
The Licinian Baths are interesting for having much of its original walls intact, as well as a long tunnel used by the slaves working at the baths. The baths were donated to the city by the Licinii family in the 3rd century. They were primarily used as winter baths. The frigidarium has triple arcades at both ends and large windows with views over the valley beyond.

== Funerary structures ==
=== Dolmens ===
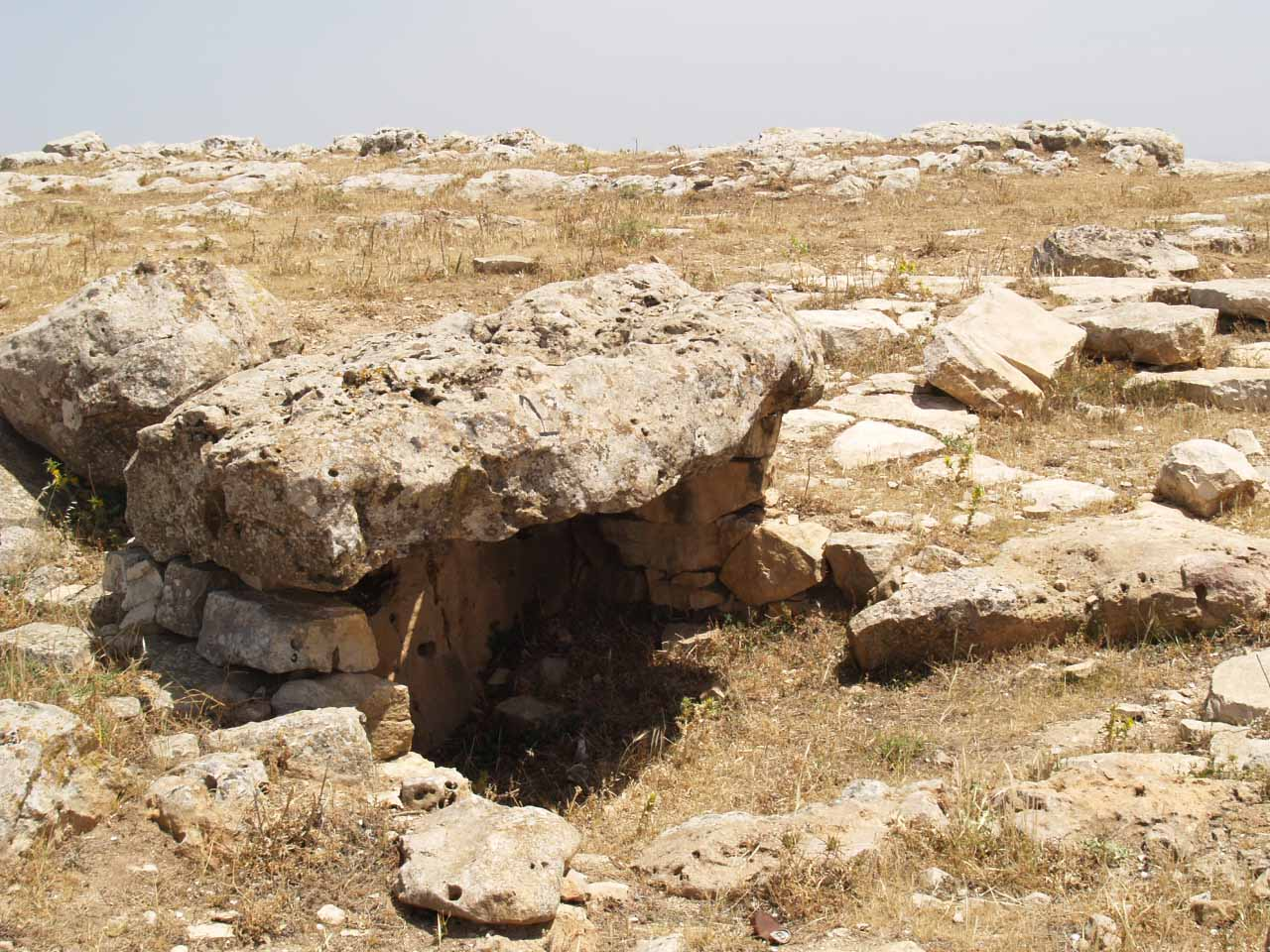
A dolmen in the northern necropolis

The presence of dolmens in North Africa has served to stoke historiographic debates that have been said to have ideological agendas. The dolmens at Dougga have been the subject of archaeological digs, which have also uncovered skeletons and ceramic models.

Although it is difficult to put a date on the erection of the dolmens, as they were in use until the dawn of the Christian era, it seems likely that they date from at least 2000 years BC. Gabriel Camps has suggested that a link to Sicily. He has made the same suggestion for the "haouanet" tombs found in Algeria and Tunisia.

=== Numidian bazina tombs ===
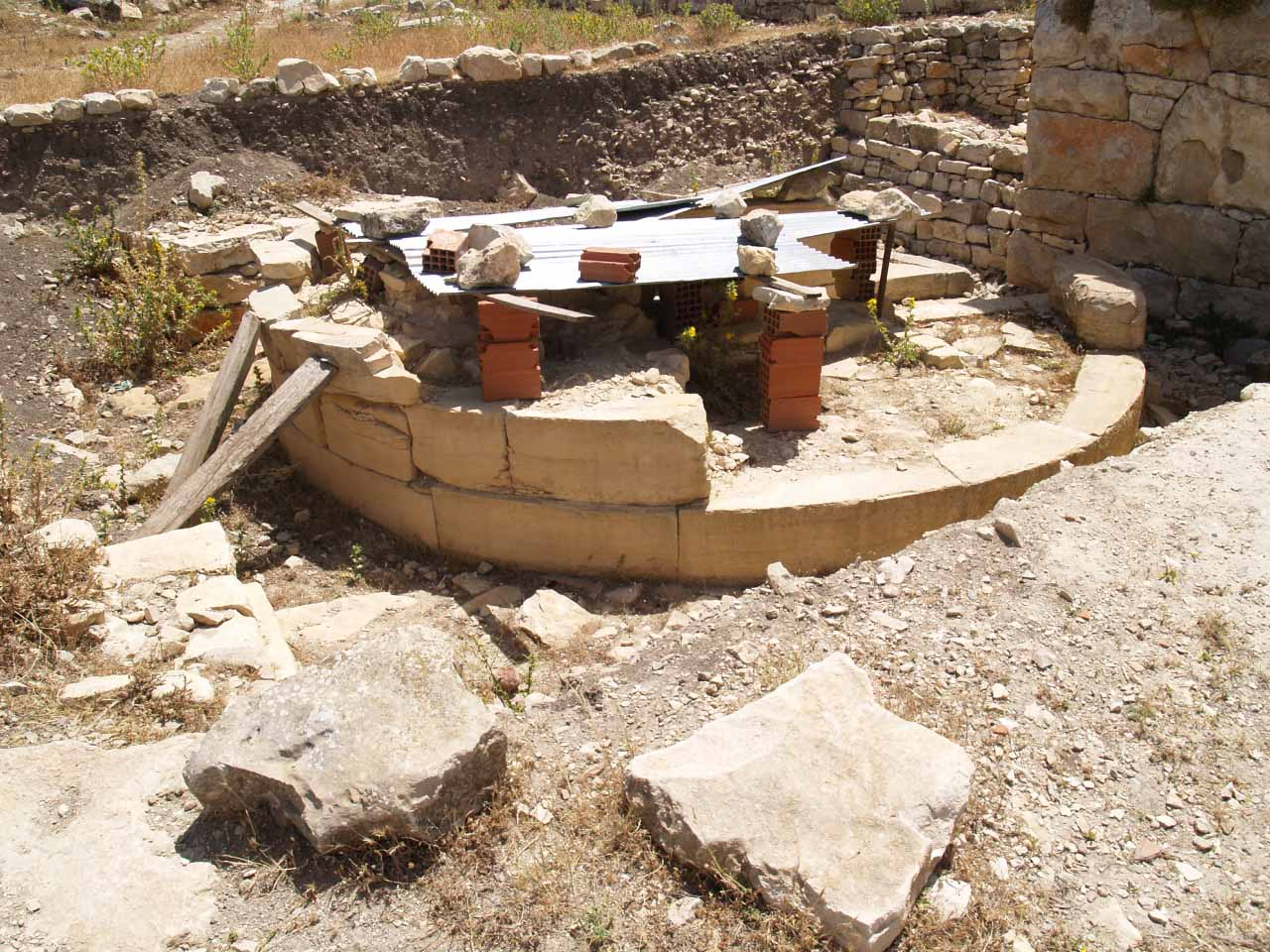
An example of a bazina tomb

A type of tomb unique to the Numidian world has been discovered at Dougga. They are referred to as bazina tombs or circular monument tombs.

=== Punic-Libyan Mausoleum ===
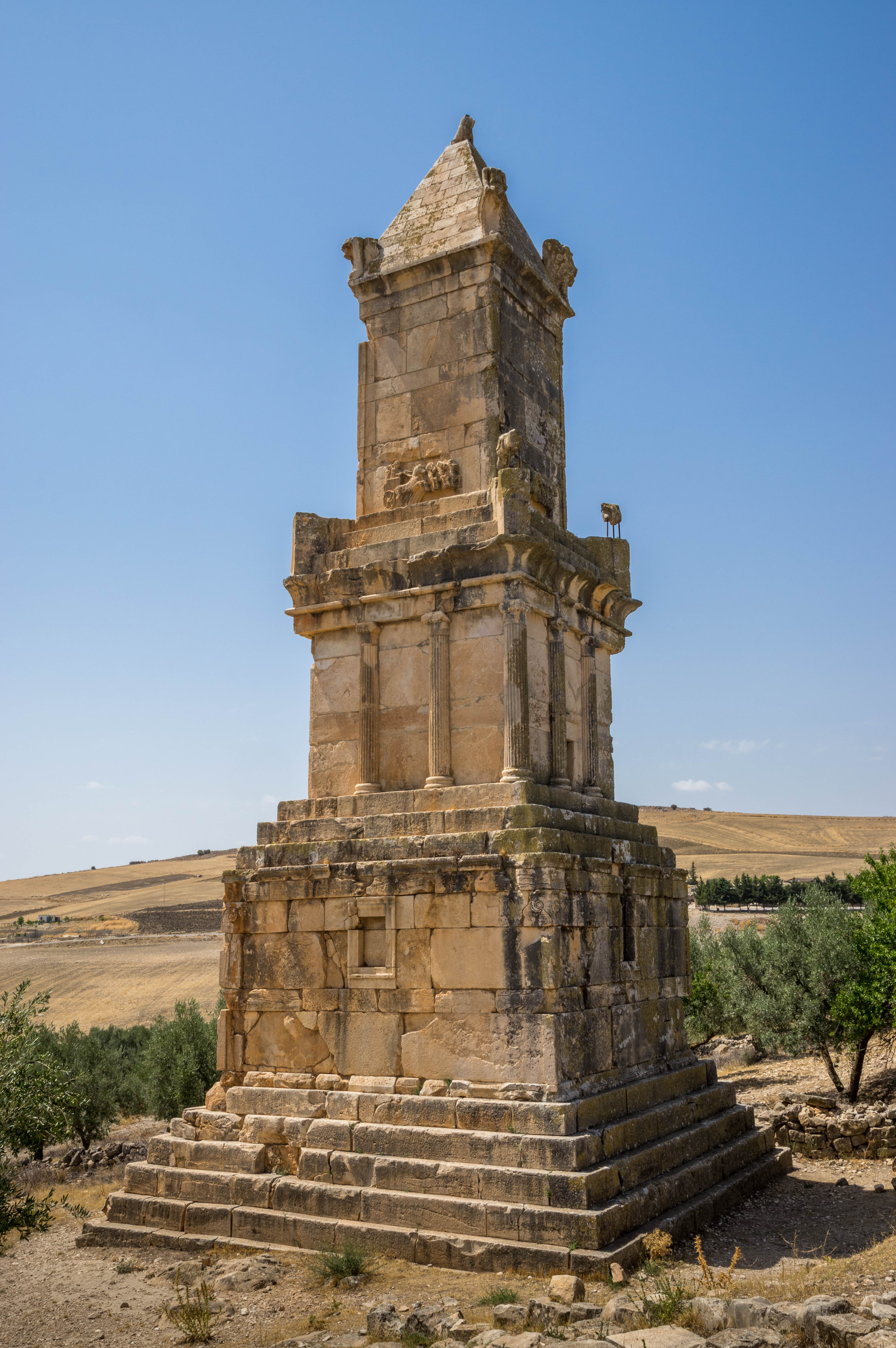
The mausoleum in its current state.

The Mausoleum of Ateban is one of the very rare examples of royal Numidian architecture. There is another in Sabratha in Libya. Some authors believe that there is a link with the funeral architecture in Anatolia and the necropoleis in Alexandria from the 3rd and 2nd century BC.

This tomb is 21 m (69 ft) tall and was built in the 2nd century BC. A bilingual inscription installed in the mausoleum mentioned that the tomb was dedicated to Ateban, the son of Iepmatath and Palu. In 1842, Sir Thomas Reade, the British consul in Tunis seriously damaged the monument while removing this inscription. This bilingual Punic-Libyan Inscription, now held at the British Museum, made it possible to decode the Libyan characters. It has only recently been established that the inscription was originally located on one side of a fake window on the podium. According to the most recent research, the names cited in the inscription are only those of its architect and of representatives of the different professions involved in its construction. The monument was built by the inhabitants of the city for a Numidian prince; some authors believe that it was intended for Massinissa

The monument owes its current appearance to the work of French archaeologist Louis Poinssot, who essentially reconstructed it from pieces that were left lying on the ground. The tomb is accessed via a pedestal with five steps. On the northern side of the podium (the lowest of three levels in the monument), there is an opening to the funeral chamber that is closed with a stone slab. The other sides are decorated with fake windows and four Aeolic pilasters. The second level is made up of a temple-like colonnade (naiskos); the columns on each side are Ionic. The third level is the most richly decorated of all: in addition to pilasters similar to those on the lowest level, it is capped with a pyramid. Some elements of carved stone have also survived.

=== Roman sepulchres ===
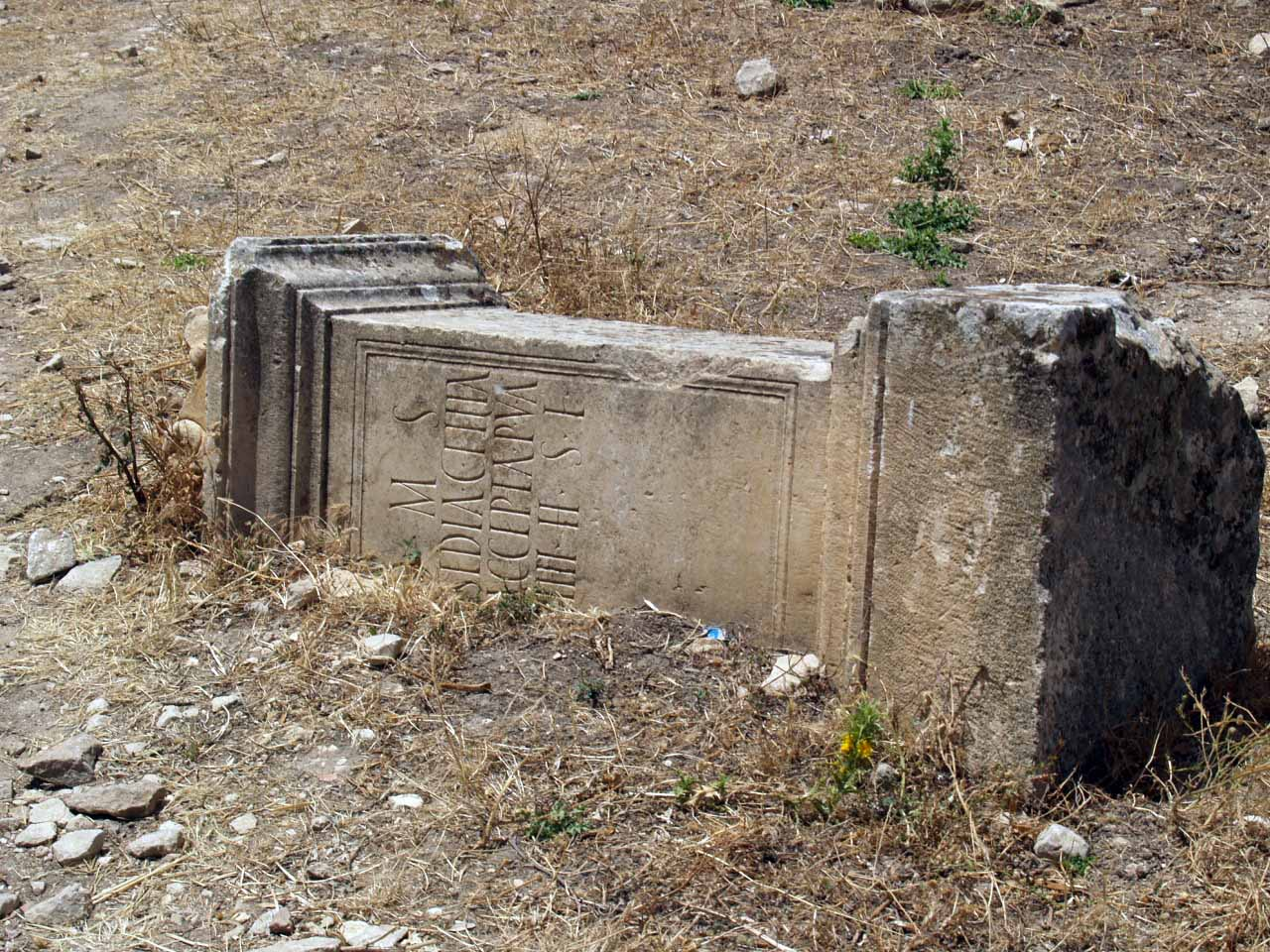
Roman funeral stele located at Dougga

Although work has in the past been undertaken to uncover the Roman sepulchres, today they have been reclaimed in part by olive trees.

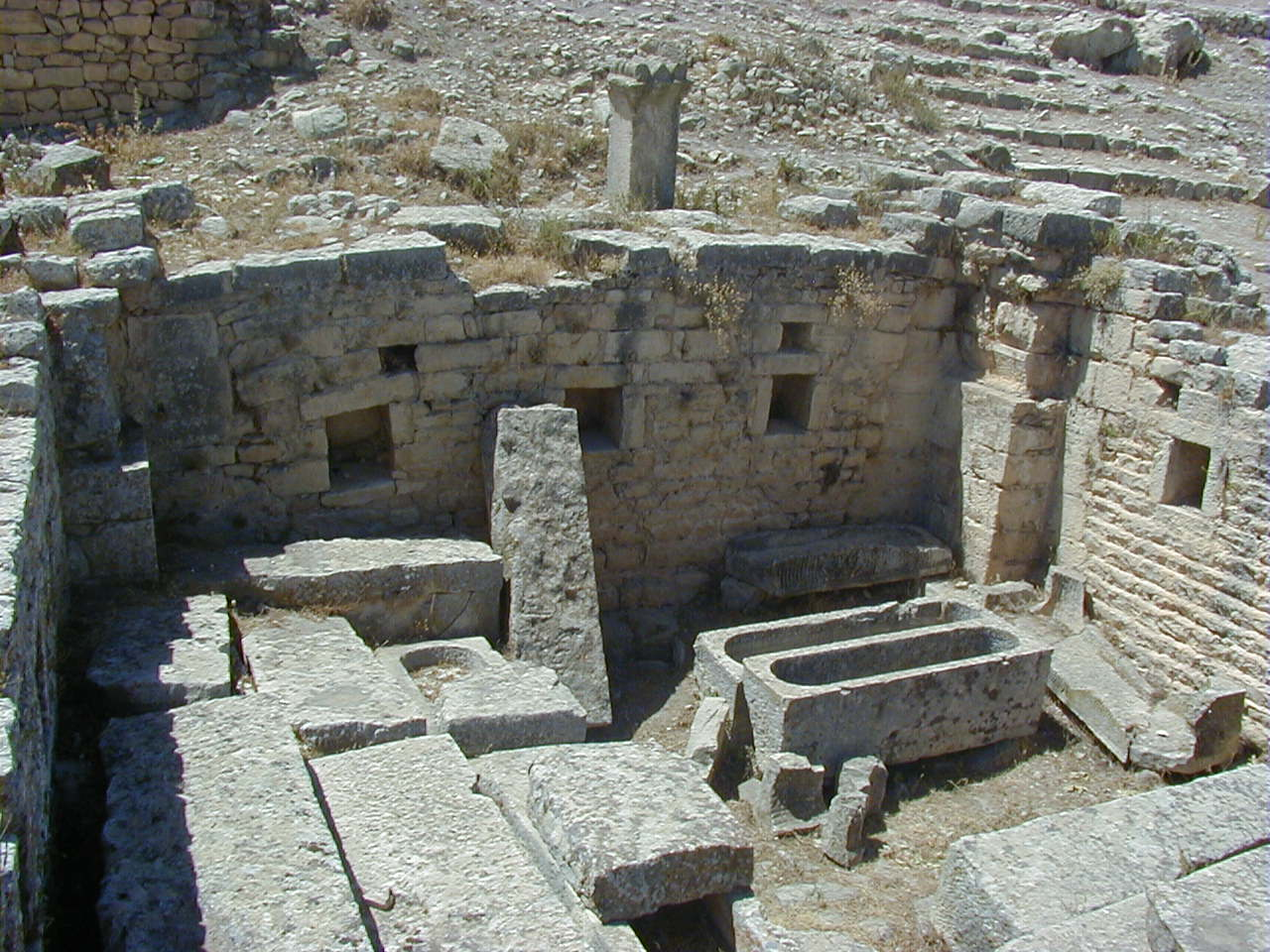
The hypogeum

The different necropoleis mark the zones of settlement at Dougga. There are five areas that have been identified as necropoleis: the first in the northeast, around the Temple of Saturn and the Victoria Church, the second in the northwest, a zone which also encompasses the dolmens on the site, the third in the west, between the Aïn Mizeb and Aïn El Hammam cisterns and to the north of the Temple of Juno Caelestis, the fourth and the fifth in the south and the south-east, one around the mausoleum and the other around Septimius Severus' triumphal arch.

=== Hypogeum ===
The hypogeum is a half-buried edifice from the 3rd century. It was erected in the middle of the oldest necropolis, which was excavated in 1913. The hypogeum was designed to house funeral urns in small niches in the walls; at the time of its discovery, it contained sarcophagi, which suggests that it was in use for a long time.

== Political monuments ==
=== Triumphal arches ===
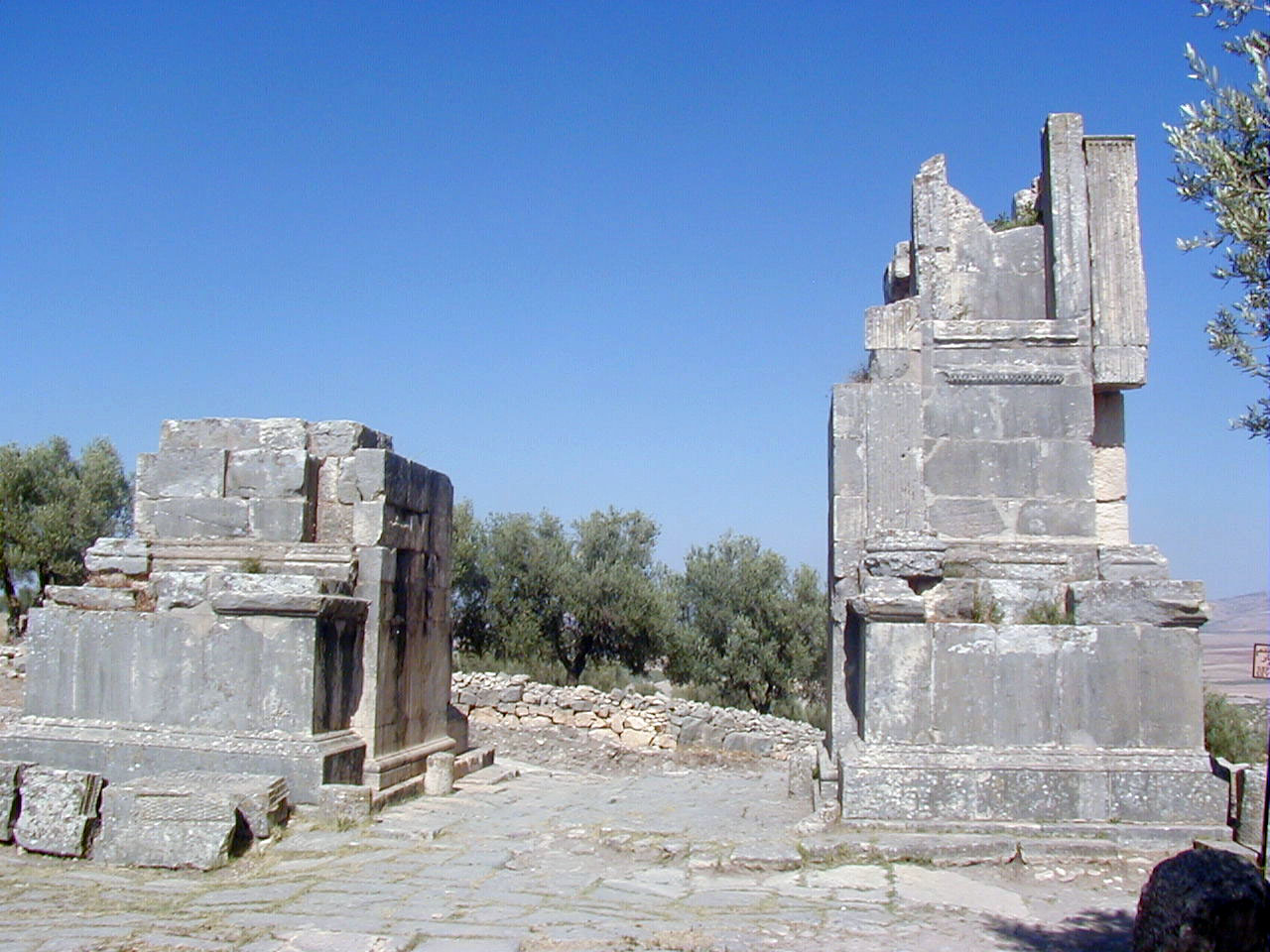
Septimius Severus's arch

Dougga still contains two triumphal arches, which are in different states of disrepair.

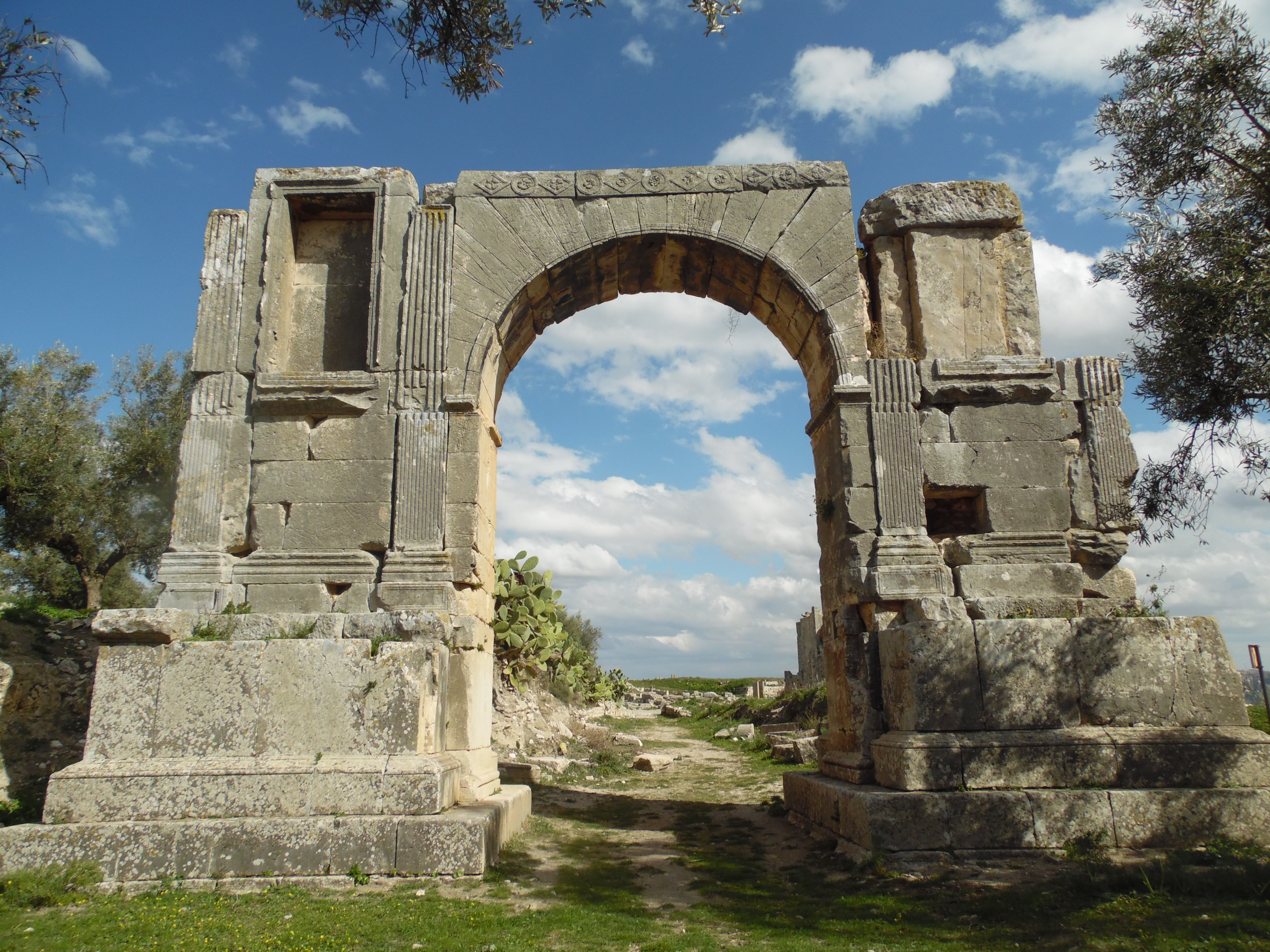
Alexander Severus's arch

Septimius Severus's arch, which is heavily damaged, stands close to the mausoleum and on the route leading from Carthage to Théveste. It was erected in AD 205.

Alexander Severus' arch, which dates from 222 to 235, is relatively well preserved, despite the loss of its upper elements. It is equidistant from the capitol and the Temple of Juno Caelestis. Its arcade is 4 m (13 ft) tall.

A third triumphal arch, dating from the Tetrarchy, has been completely lost.

=== Forum ===
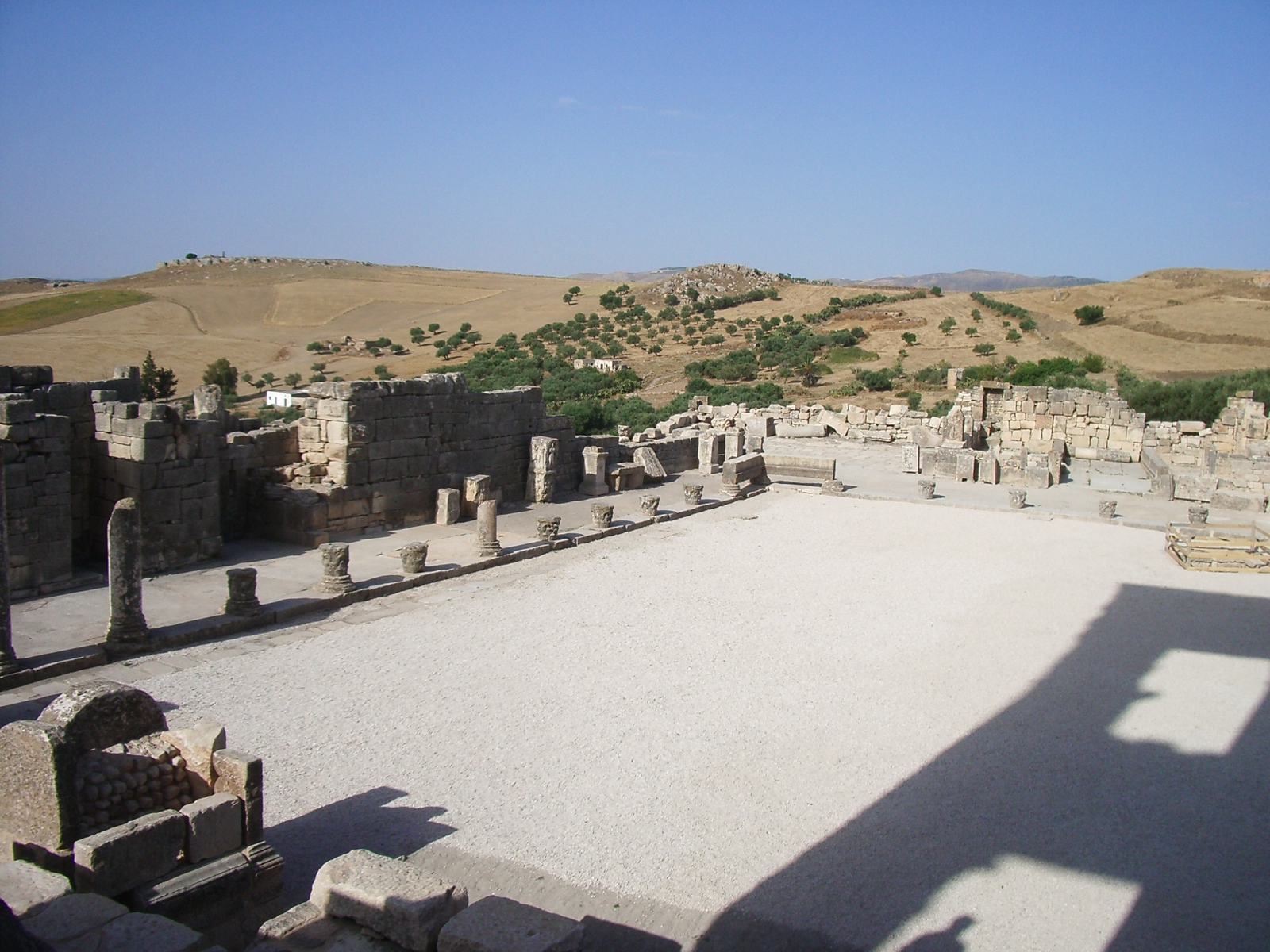
A view of the western section of the forum from the capitol.

The city forum, which is 924 m^{2} (9,950 sq ft) in size is small. It is better preserved in some places than others, because the construction of the Byzantine fort damaged a large section of it. The capitol, which stands on an area surrounded by porticos, dominates its surroundings by virtue of its imposing appearance. The "square of the Rose of the Winds" (which is named after a decorative element) seems more like an esplanade leading to the Temple of Mercury, which stands on its northern side, than an open public space. The city's curia and a tribune for speeches probably also stood here.

Long ago, archaeologists believed that Roman settlement at Dougga occurred ex nihilo. This suggestion has been contradicted by the discovery of a sanctuary dedicated to Massinissa amongst the substructures to the rear of the capitol.

== Recreational facilities ==
=== Theatre ===
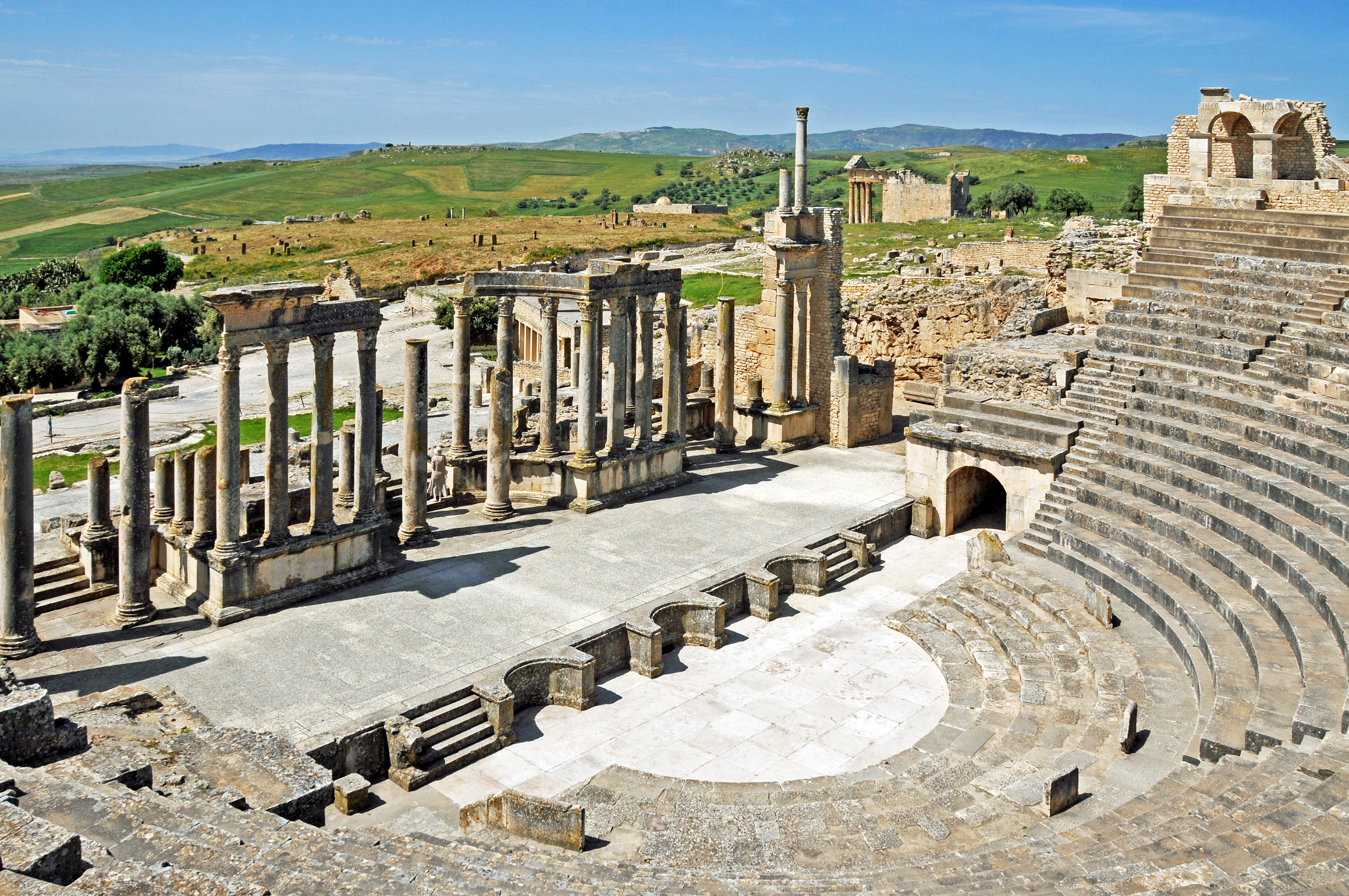
The Roman theatre of Dougga

Roman theatres were a fundamental element of the monumental make-up of a city from the reign of Augustus.

The theatre, which was built in AD 168 or 169, is one of the best preserved examples in Roman Africa. It could seat 3500 spectators, even though Dougga only had 5000 inhabitants. It was one of a series of imperial buildings constructed over the course of two centuries at Dougga which deviate from the classic "blueprints" only inasmuch as they have been adapted to take account of the local terrain. Some minor adjustments have been made and the local architects had a certain freedom with regard to the ornamentation of the buildings.

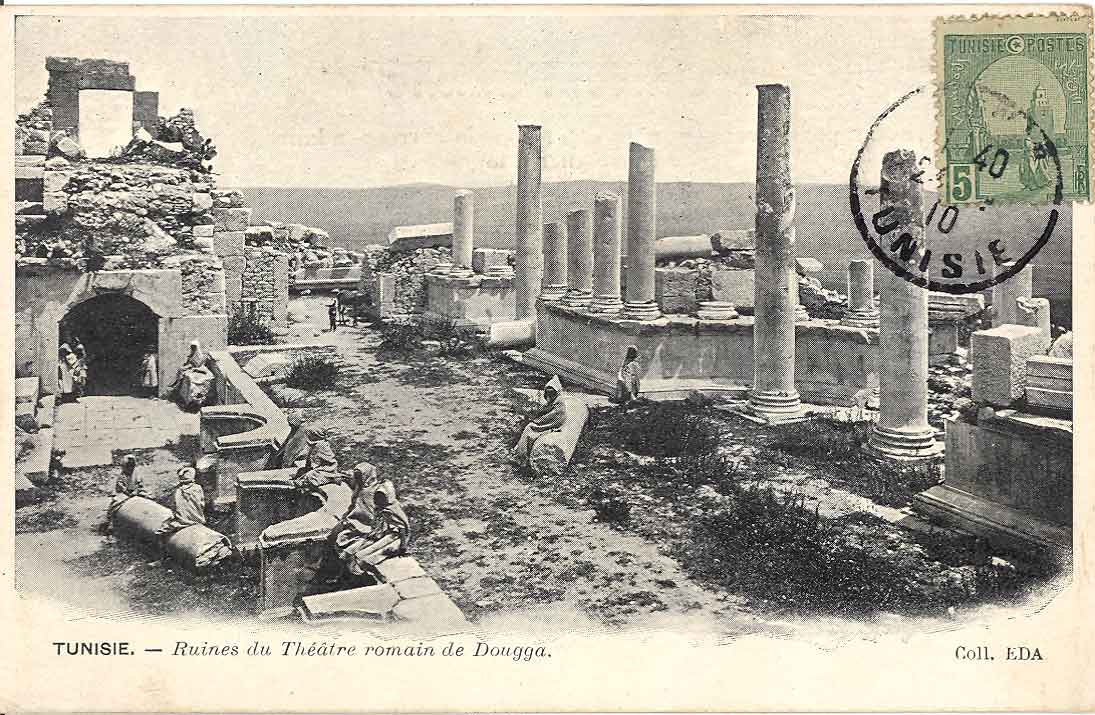
The theater at the start of the 20th century

A dedication engraved into the pediment of the stage and on the portico the dominates the city, recalls the building's commissioner, P. Marcius Quadratus, who "built [it] for his homeland with his own denarii"; the dedication was celebrated with "scenic representations, distributions of life, a festival and athletic games".

The theater is still used for performances of classic theater, particularly during the festival of Dougga, and conservation work has been carried out on it.

=== Auditorium ===
The site known as the auditorium is an annex of the Temple of Liber, which probably served for the initiation of novices. Despite its modern appellation, the auditorium was not a site for spectacles; only its form suggests otherwise. It measures 20 m × 20 m (66 ft × 66 ft).

=== Circus ===
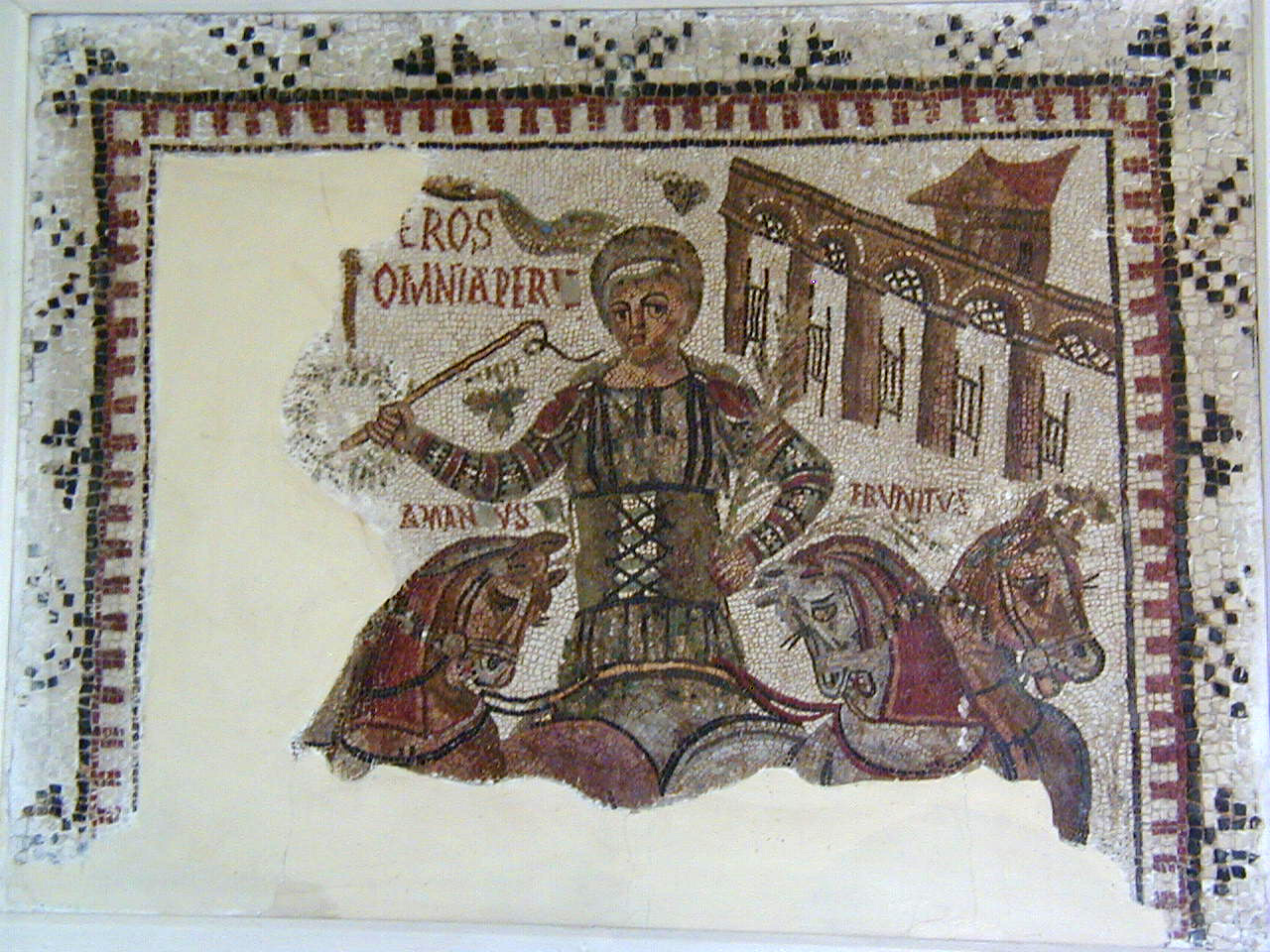
Mosaic of the charioteer found at Dougga and on display at the Bardo National Museum

The city has a circus designed for chariot racing, but it is barely visible nowadays. Originally, the circus consisted of nothing more than a field; an inscription in the temple in honor of Caracalla's victory in Germany notes that the land was donated by the Gabinii in 214 and describes it as an ager qui appellatur circus (field that serves as a circus) ). In 225 though, the site was prepared and the circus was constructed. It was financed by the magistrates (duumviri and aedile) after they had promised to do so following in response to a request from the entire population of the city. The circus was built to take the maximum possible advantage of the surrounding landscape, in reflection of an understandable need to limit costs in a medium-sized city with limited resources, but certainly also out of desire to finish the construction works as quickly as possible, given that magistrates' mandates were limited to one year. The construction was nonetheless expected to have "a certain magnitude"; at 393 m (1,289 ft) long with a spina 190 m × 6 m (623 ft × 20 ft), the circus is quite extraordinary in Roman Africa. The circus marks Dougga out as one of the most important cities in the province, alongside Carthage, Thysdrus, Leptis Magna, Hadrumet et Utica. The donation of the land for the pleasure of the general populace (ad voluptatem populi) and its development following a request from the entire population (postulante universo populo) are a reminder of the importance of spectacles in the social life of Roman cities and the demand for popular entertainment.

=== Amphitheater ===
The question of whether there was an amphitheater at Dougga has not been conclusively answered. Traditionally, a large elliptic depression to the northwest of the site has been interpreted as the site of an amphitheater. Archeologists have however become much more cautious on this subject.

=== Baths ===
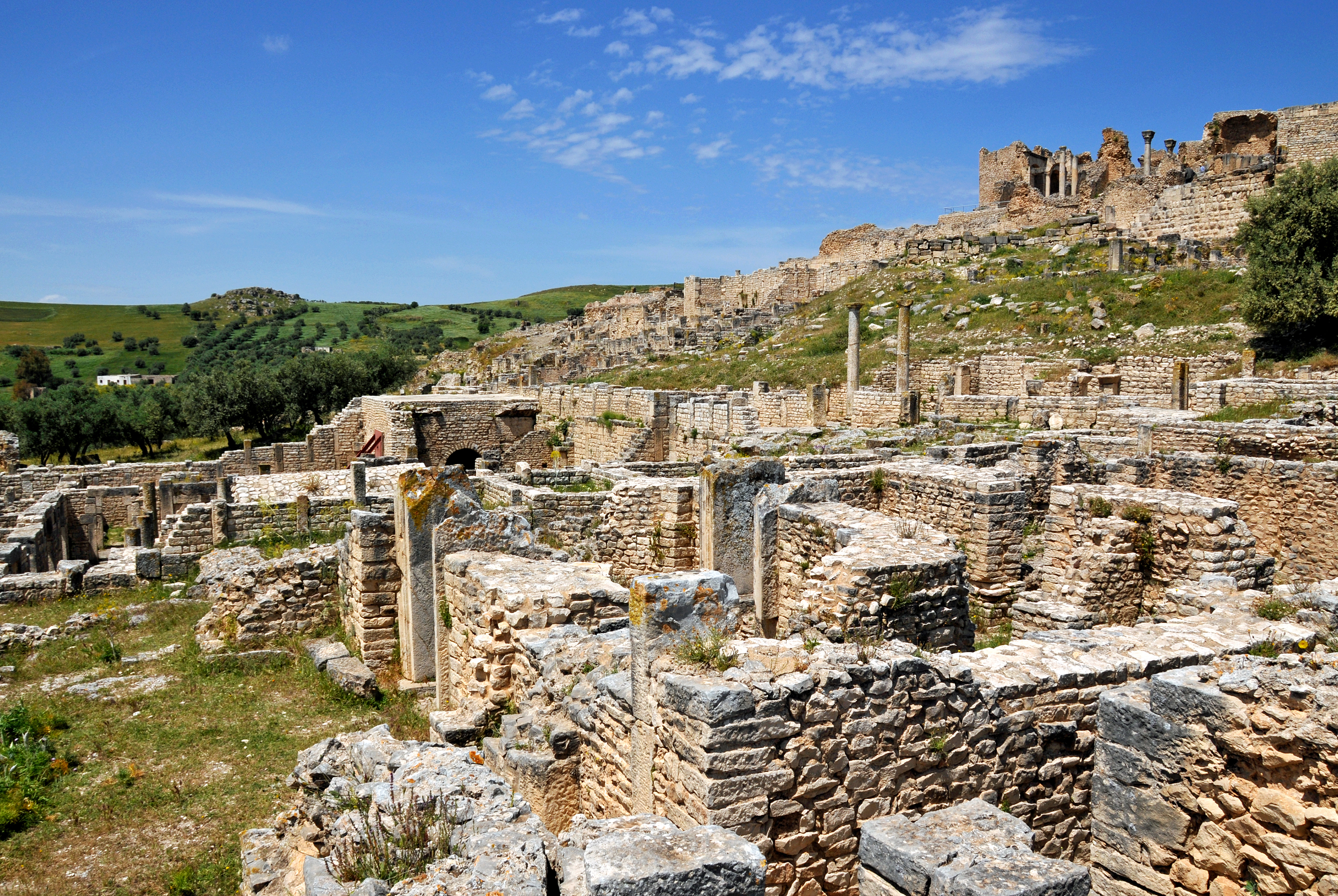
The Bath of the Cyclopses

Three Roman baths have been completely excavated at Dougga; a fourth has so far only been partially uncovered. Of these four baths, one ("the bath of the house to the west of the Temple of Tellus") belongs to a private residence, two, the Aïn Doura bath and the bath known for a long time as the "Licinian bath", were, judging by their size, open to the public, while the nature of the last bath, the bath of the Cyclopses, is more difficult to interpret.

==== Bath of the Cyclopses ====
During the excavation of the Bath of the Cyclopses, a mosaic of cyclopses forging Jupiter's thunderbolts was uncovered. It is now on display at the Bardo National Museum, where several very well preserved latrines are also on display. The building has been dated to the 3rd century CE on the basis of a study of the mosaic.

The size of the building (its frigidarium is less than 30 m^{2} (320 sq ft)) has led some experts to believe that it was a private bath, but the identification of a domus in the immediate vicinity has proven difficult. The "trifolium villa" is quite distant, and the closest ruins are hard to identify as they have not been well preserved. Yvon Thébert therefore suggests that the bath served the local quarter.

==== Antonian or Licinian Bath ====
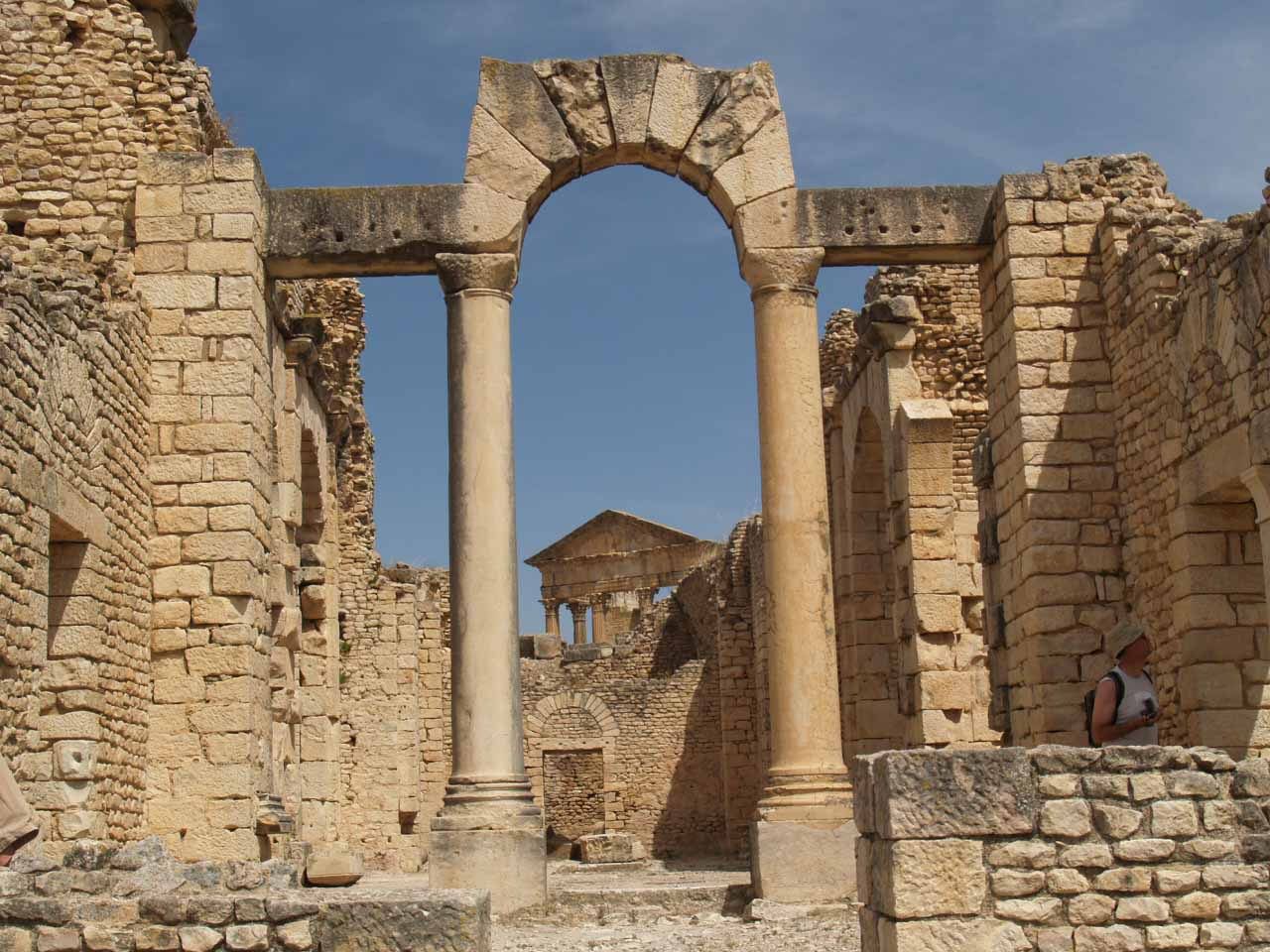
The capitol seen from Antonian Bath

The Antonian Bath, which dates from the 3rd century, was known as the Licinian Baths (after emperor Publius Licinius Egnatius Gallienus) and has several storeys. Louis Poinssot's identification of the bath as dating to Gallienus' reign on the basis of incomplete inscriptions and Dougga's prosperity at this time has been called into question by recent research, conducted in particular by Michel Christol. Christol has suggested that the bath dates from the reign of Caracalla; this thesis has since been confirmed by an analysis of inscriptions. Others have even suggested that the bath dates from the reign of the Severan dynasty, because of a particularity which became common a century later in the west: the columns in the northwest peristyle feature daises bearing arches.

The bath was later used for the production of olive oil at an unknown date.

The symmetrical building is medium-sized, with an area of 1,700 m^{2} (18,000 sq ft) excluding the palaestra, of which 175 m^{2} (1,880 sq ft) are taken up by the frigidarium. The construction of the bath required work both to lower and to raise sections of the slope on which it stood, which may explain why parts of the building have been better preserved than others; the section built on raised ground has for the most part been lost.

==== Aïn Doura Baths ====
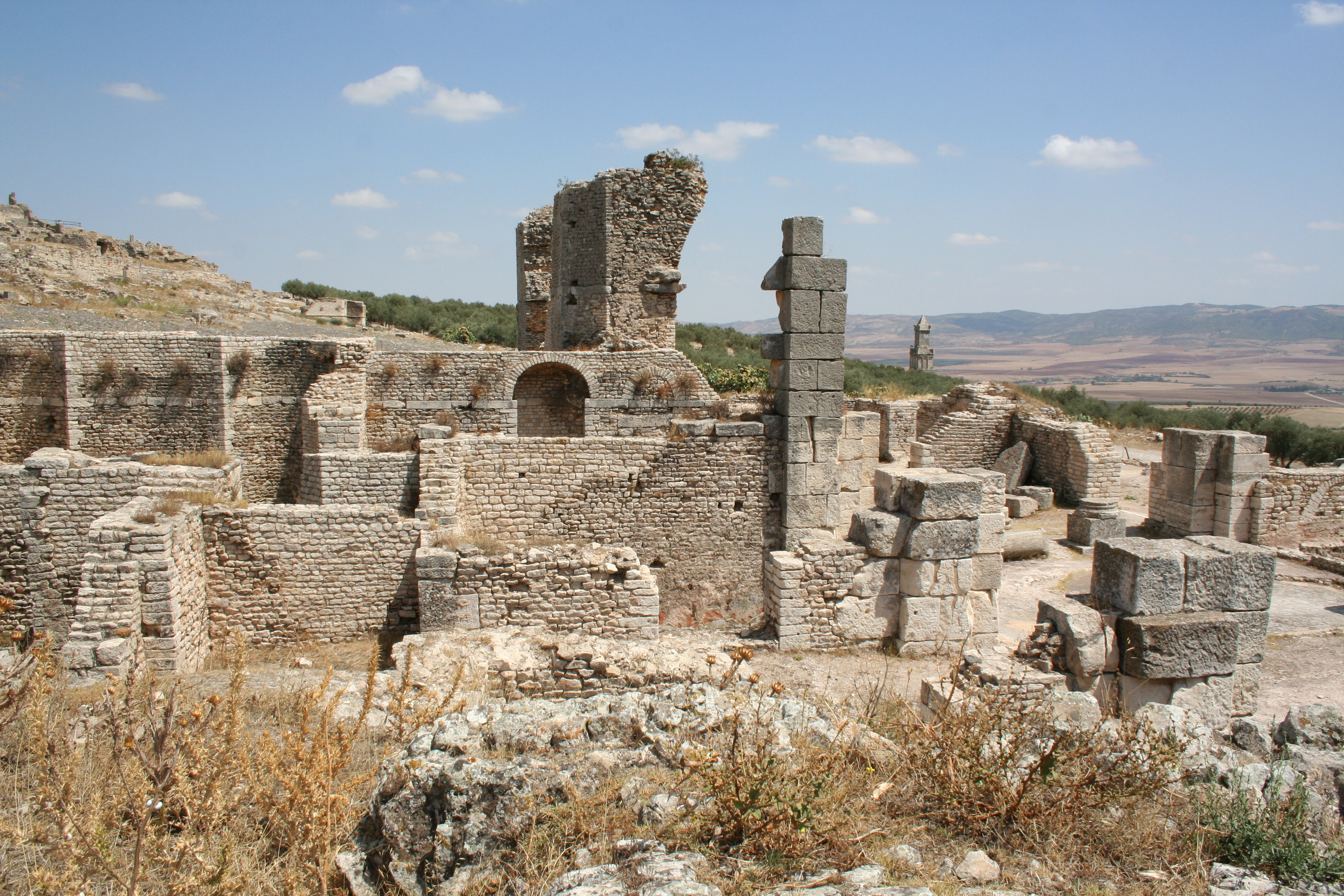
Aïn Doura Baths

In the immediate vicinity of Aïn Doura is a partially excavated complex that could turn out to be the largest bath in the city, the Aïn Doura Baths. On the basis of the mosaics that have been found here, it has been suggested that the bath dates from the end of the 2nd century or the start of the 3rd century, and that the mosaic décor was renewed in the 4th century CE.

The complex remains largely unexposed, but it seems, according to Yvon Thébert, that it has a symmetrical design, of which only a section of the cold rooms has been excavated.

==== The bath of the house to the west of the Temple of Tellus ====
This bath, measuring 75 m^{2} (810 sq ft), which can be accessed from the house and from the street, was uncovered at the start of the 20th century. The archaeological analysis of the bath's relationship with the house in which it is located has led Thébert to suggest that it was a later addition to the original construction but he does not propose a date for this event.

== Religious edifices ==
There is archaeological or epigraphic evidence for more than twenty temples at Dougga; a significant number for a small city. There are archaeological remains and inscriptions proving the existence of eleven temples, archaeological remains of a further eight, and inscriptions referring to another fourteen. This abundance of religious sites is the result in particular of the philanthropy of wealthy families.

=== Temple of Massinissa ===
The Temple of Massinissa is located on the western flank of the capital. The first archaeologists believed that the remains of the temple were a monumental fountain, even though an inscription proving the existence of a sanctuary to the deceased Numidian king was discovered in 1904. This inscription has been dated to 139 BC, during the reign of Micipsa.

The remains are similar to those of the temple in Chemtou and are evidence of the fact that the political center of the Roman city was in the same place as the Hellenic agora. The stone remains found in this area seem to belong to several different structures; the exact location of the sanctuary is still open to debate.

Although it is believed that the sanctuary set Massinissa on par with a god, this is debated by some experts. Gsell believes that a temple to the king would reflect a continuation of eastern and Hellenic practices; Camps builds on this hypothesis, pointing out the lack of any antique sources testifying to anything more than simple expressions of respect by a people vis-à-vis its king. According to Camps, the temple is only a memorial, a site belonging to a funeral cult. Its construction ten years into Micipsa's reign can be explained by its political symbolism: Micipsa, sole ruler after the death of his brothers Gulussa and Mastanabal, was affirming the unity of his kingdom around the person of the king.

=== The Capitol ===
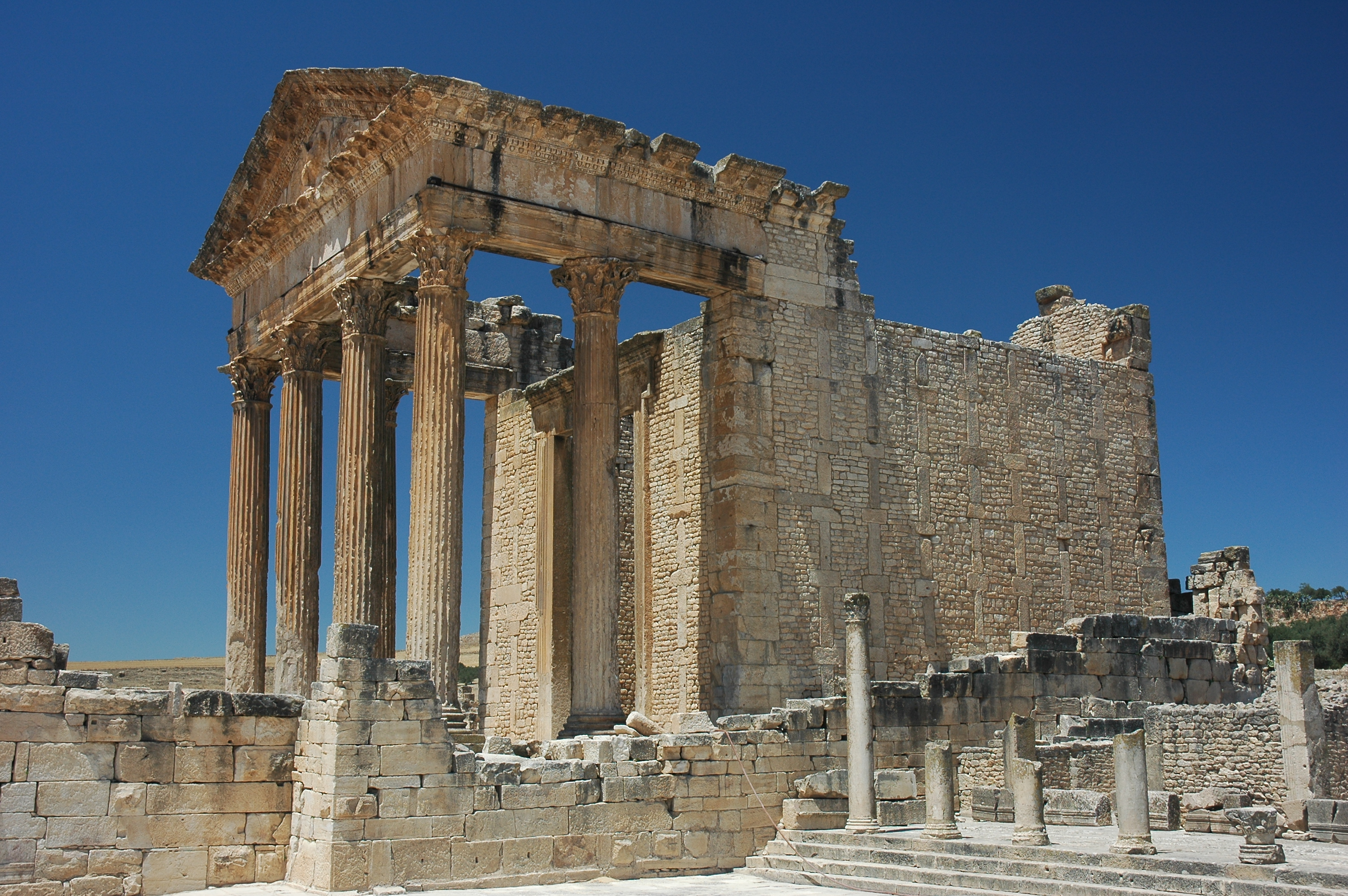
The Capitol in 2008

The Capitol is a Roman temple from the 2nd century, principally dedicated to Rome's protective triad: Jupiter Best and Greatest (Jupiter Optimus Maximus), Juno the Queen (Juno Regina), and Minerva the August (Minerva Augusta). It has a secondary dedication to the wellbeing of the emperors Lucius Verus and Marcus Aurelius; judging by this reference, the Capitol must have been completed in AD 166-167.

Thomas d'Arcos identified the Capitol as a temple of Jupiter in the 17th century. It was the object of further research at the end of the 19th century, led in particular by the doctor Louis Carton in 1893. The walls, executed in opus africanum style, and the entablature of the portico were restored between 1903 and 1910. Claude Poinssot discovered a crypt beneath the cella in 1955. The most recent works were carried out by the Tunisian Institut national du patrimoine between 1994 and 1996.

The Capitol is exceptionally well preserved, which is a consequence of its inclusion in the Byzantine fortification. A series of eleven stairs lead up to the front portico. The temple front's Corinthian columns are 8 m (26 ft) tall, on top of which is the perfectly preserved pediment. The pediment bears a depiction of emperor Antoninus Pius's elevation to godhood. The emperor is being carried by an eagle.

The base of the cella still features alcoves for three statues. The middle alcove houses a colossal statue of Jupiter.

The discovery of the head of a statue of Jupiter has led Poinssot to suggest that the crypt dates from the period of Christianity's triumph over the old religions. St-Amans does not exclude the possibility that the crypt was built at the same time as the Byzantine citadel, of which the forum and capitol formed the nerve center.

The construction of the Capitol at Dougga occurred at the same time as the construction of other monuments of the same type elsewhere in North Africa, which Gros explains as a consequence of the greater proximity of the imperial cult and the cult of Jupiter.

Near the Capitol are the "square of the Rose of the Winds"—which is named after a compass rose that is engraved on the floor—and the remains of the Byzantine citadel, which reused a section of the ruins after the city's decline.

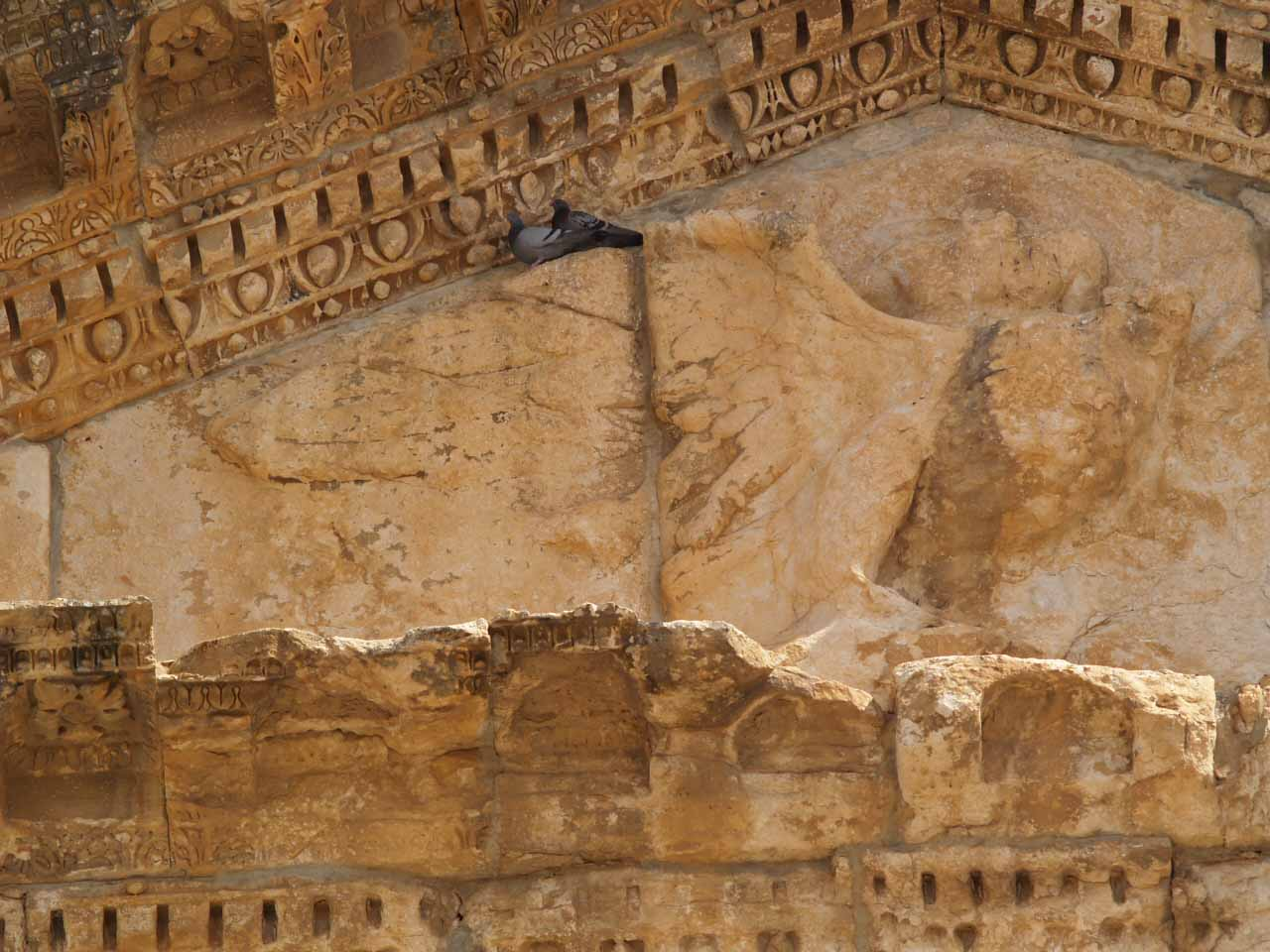
Antoninus Pius' elevation to godhood

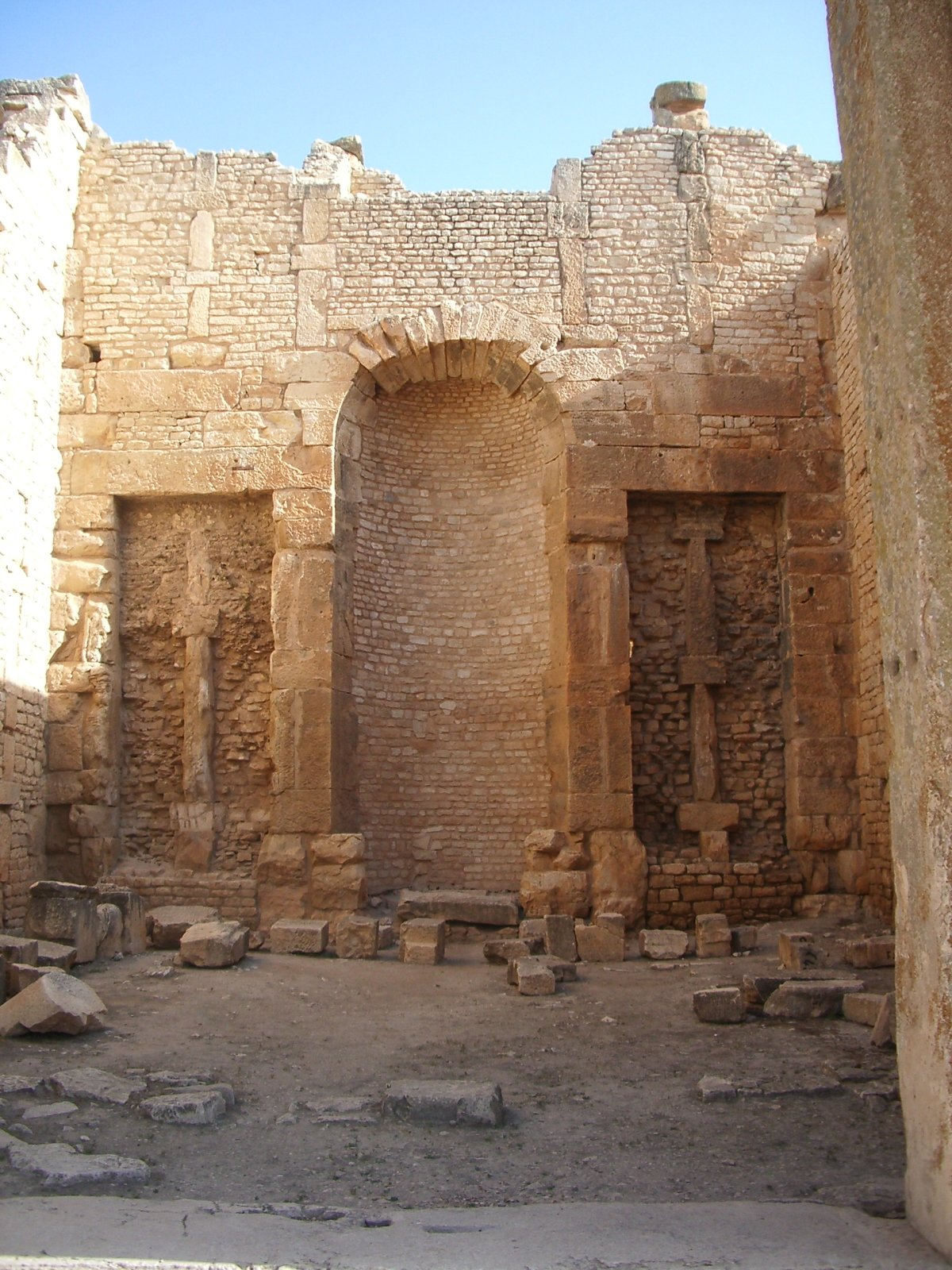
Interior of the cella with the alcoves designed to hold statues

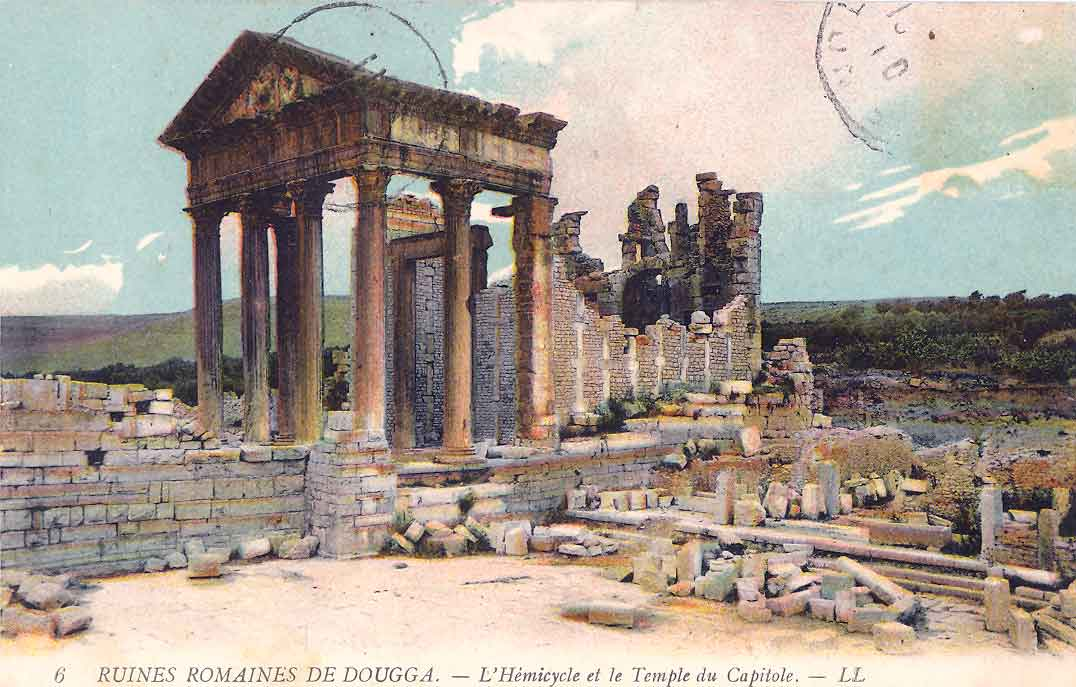
The Capitol at the start of the 20th century

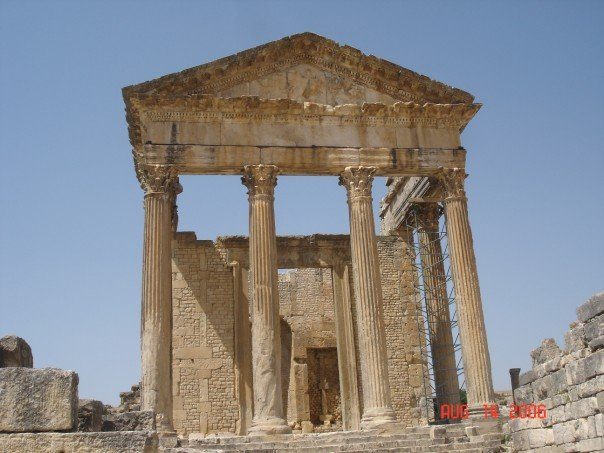
The front of the Capitol in 2006

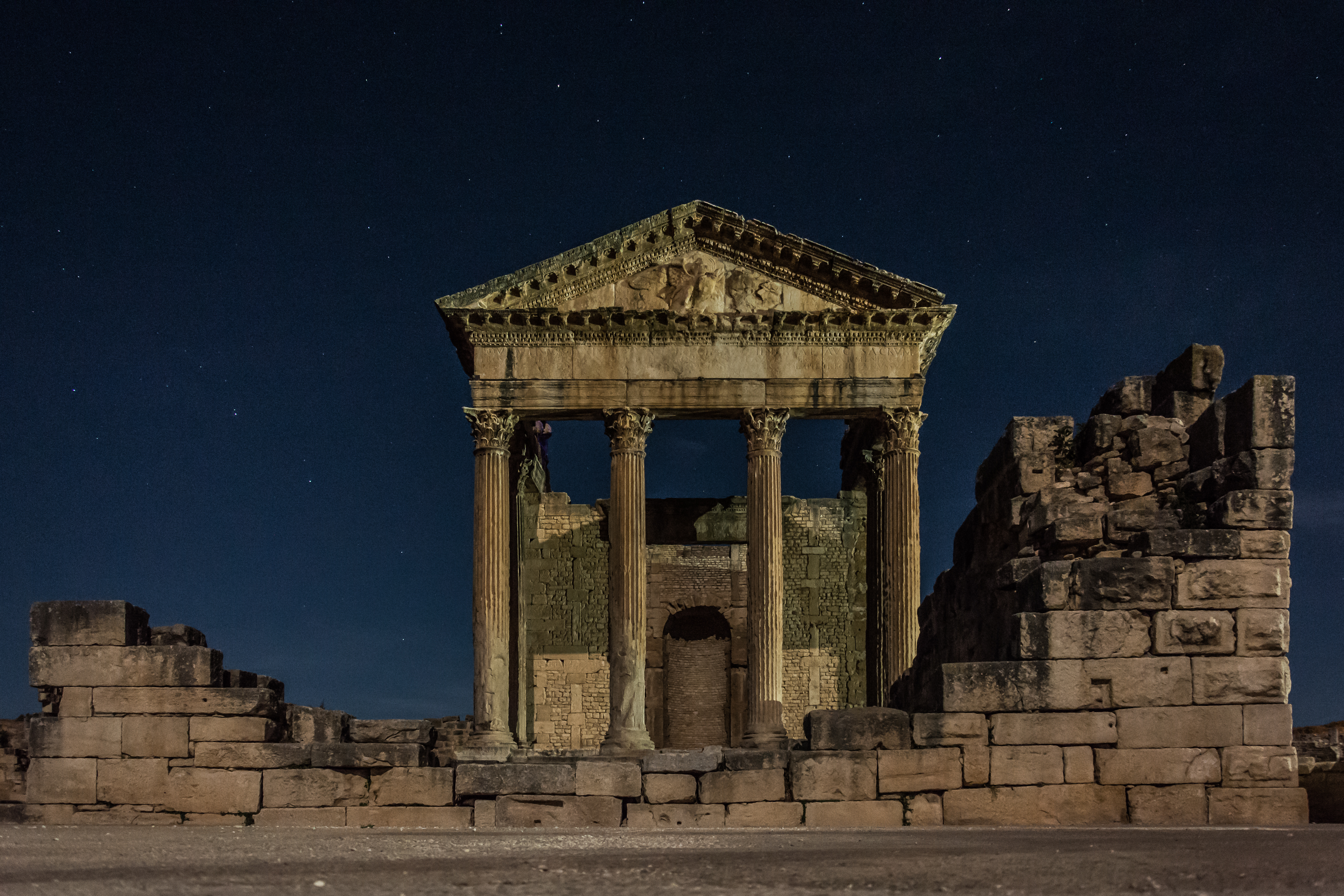
The Capitol at night

=== Temple of Mercury ===
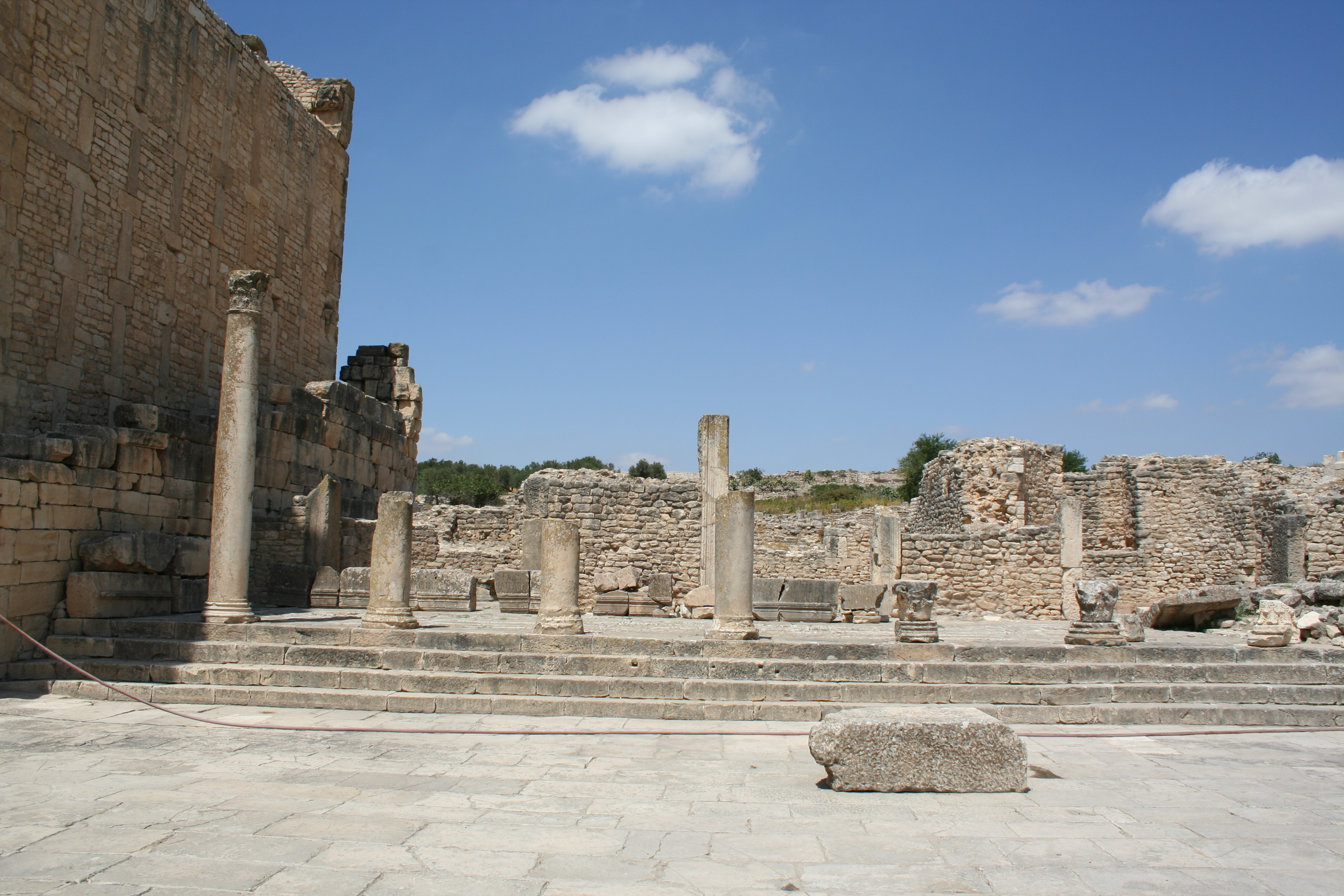
Temple of Mercury

The Temple of Mercury is also dedicated to Tellus. It faces towards the market; between the two lies the "square of the Rose of the Winds". The temple is largely in ruins. It has three cellae but no courtyard. The sanctuary, which can be accessed via a series of four stairs, stands on a faded podium. It was excavated and shored up between 1904 and 1908.

=== Temple of August Piety ===
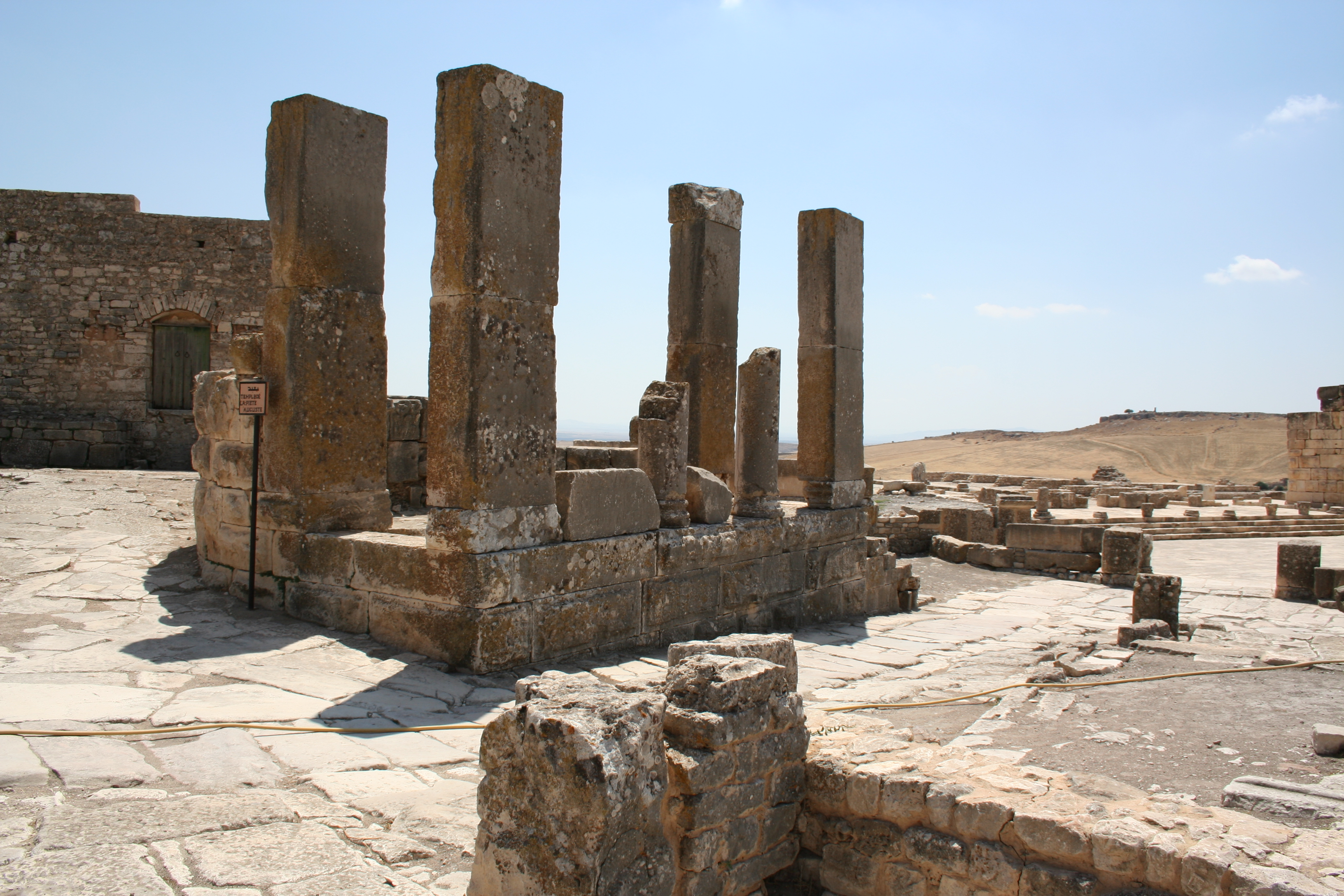
Temple of August Piety seen from the north

The small Temple of August Piety was built during the reign of Hadrian. It was financed through the philanthropy of a certain Caius Pompeius Nahanius. The temple faces the "square of the Rose of the Winds". Part of the vestibule survives. Behind the temple, on the foundations of the Temple of Fortuna, Venus Concordia and Mercury, stands a mosque. The mosque is the last remnant of the little village that existed on the site until the creation of New Dougga.

D'Arcos identified the temple in 1631 thanks to an inscription that was still in place at the time. The podium is relatively low (1–1.5 m or 3 ft 3 in – 4 ft 11 in); it can be ascended by a series of seven stairs on the southern side.

=== Temple of Minerva ===
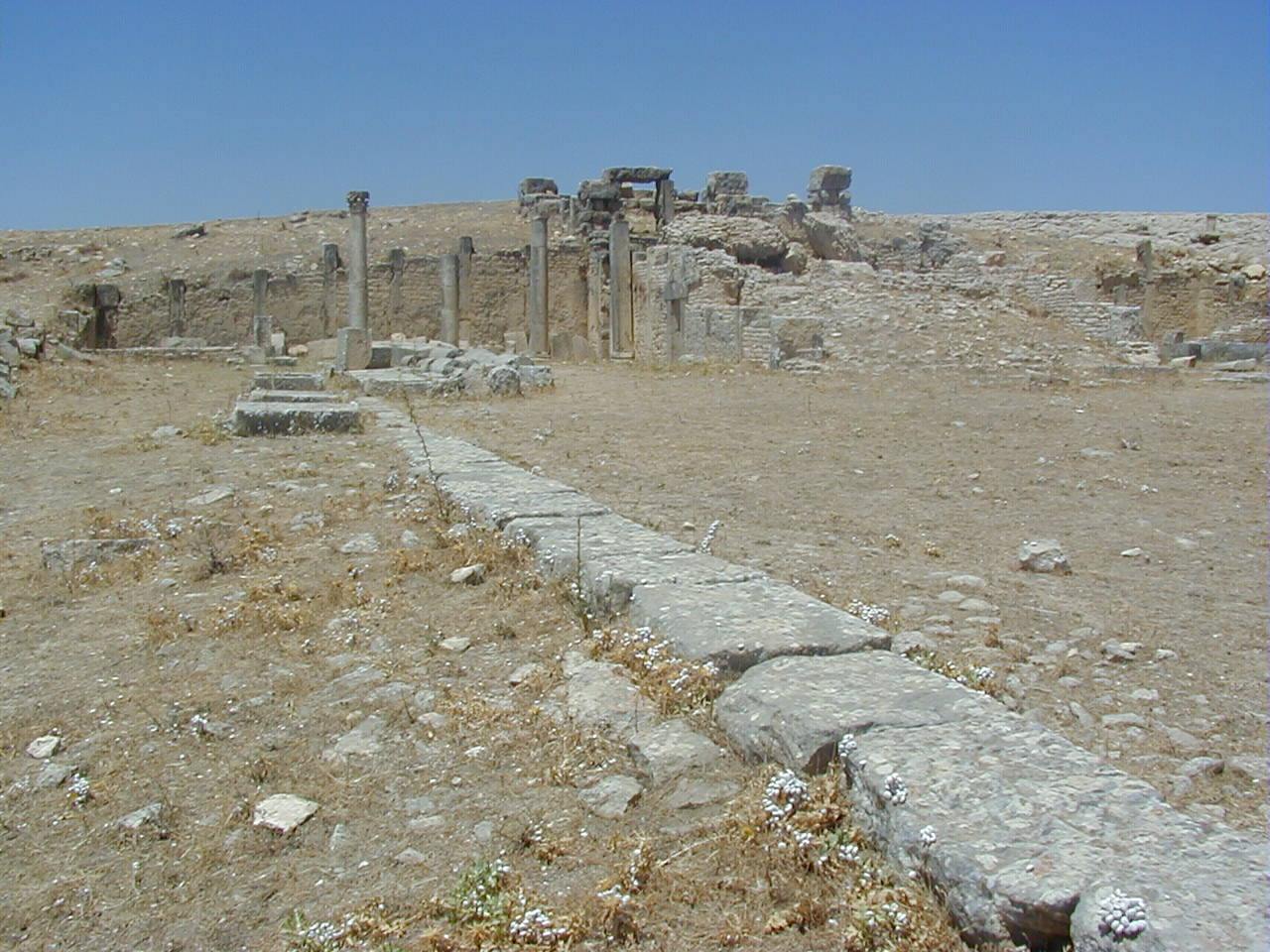
The second Temple of Minerve seen from the east

The first Temple of Minerva at Dougga was a gift of the patron of the civitas at the end of the 1st century, but the more important site dedicated to this divinity is a building which features a temple and an area surrounded by a portico dating from the reign of Antoninus Pius. It was financed through the philanthropy of a priestess of the imperial cult, Julia Paula Laenatiana. The building was designed to take advantage of the slope on which it stands; the podium is at the level of the roof of the portico and the temple in the strict sense of the word is located outside the surrounding building. The stairs providing access to the temple accentuates the inaccessible nature of the divinity.

=== Temple of Caracalla's Victory in Germany ===
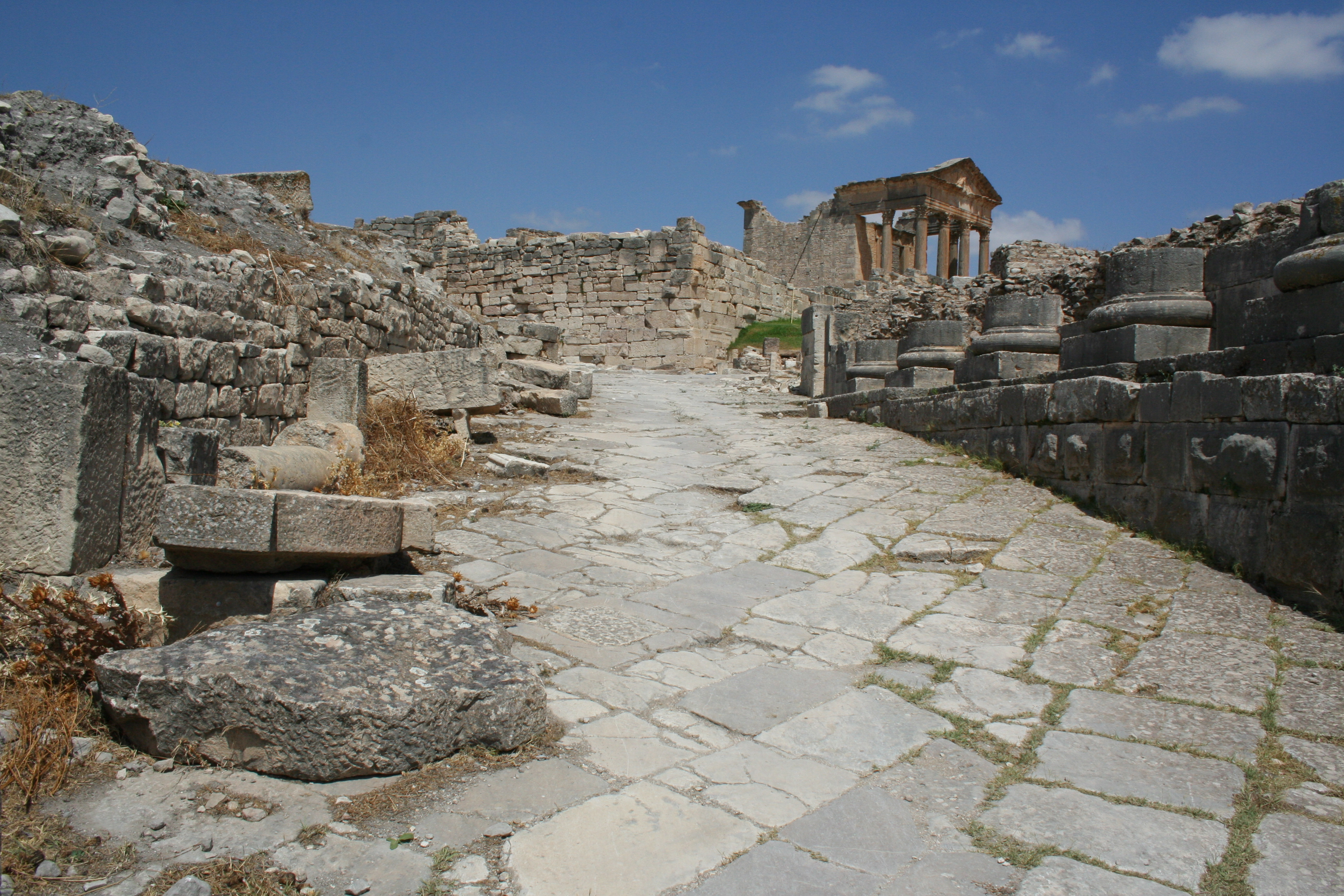
The Temple of Caracalla's Victory in Germany (visible to the right) on the road to Aïn Doura

The Temple of Caracalla's Victory in Germany is the only edifice dedicated to the imperial cult to have been located precisely at Dougga. Fragments of an inscription on the temple's lintel were discovered in 1835, but the temple was not identified until 1966. It features a nymphaeum that dates to the reign of Commodus.

The temple, which is relatively narrow, has an unusual design. It is 41.5 m × 14.2 m (136 ft × 47 ft), and is situated beside the road that descends from the forum to the Aïn Doura Bath. The temple is associated with a triumphal arch over the road. The temple can be accessed via a semi-circular staircase; in each corner of the courtyard in front of the staircase is a reservoir for rain water. The cella inside the sanctuary features six lateral niches which are designed to hold the bases of statues of Apollo, Liber, Neptune, Mercury and of two other gods that can no longer be identified.

The temple can be seen from afar, but passers-by can only see the cella, the foundations of which are decoratively rusticated. Seven columns are spaced along the cella, linking to the lateral door, which opens onto the staircase. The tetrastyle temple is built in Tuscan order in antis. The temple's design is unusual inasmuch as temples of the imperial cult are generally Corinthian and located in the middle of a vast courtyard with a portico; the Tuscan order was thus quite rare in the provinces.

The temple therefore bears witness to a desire to construct something that was different from other such buildings, doubtless in response to the constraints created by the terrain. The dedication in the temple sheds light on its construction: the inscription, which has been very precisely dated to AD 214, consecrates the temple to the personification of victory, Victoria, here specifically in connection with the emperor's campaigns in Germany, for the welfare of Caracalla and of his mother Iulia Domna.

The text recalls the military projects of the son of Septimius Severus and their celebration within the context of the imperial cult. This inscription also explains that the temple was constructed at a cost of 100,000 sestertii on the wishes of a great lady of Dougga named Gabinia Hermiona after her death. Besides the generosity of this act of philanthropy, her will foresaw the holding of an annual banquet for the ordo decurionum to be financed by her inheritors on the anniversary of the dedication of the temple. At the same time, Gabinia Hermiona bequeathed the land for the circus "for the pleasure of the people".

The temple occupied what was doubtlessly one of the last free spaces in the vicinity of the forum. The temple's benefactor preferred this site in the city center to those that she owned in the outskirts: the site of the circus or the site where the Temple of Celeste was later built. Gabinia's family, one of the richest in Dougga, was well placed within Carthage's notables and maintained its power at Dougga, even during the reduction of the local aristocracy in the 3rd century. The terms of Gabinia's will provide evidence of her concern that the family should endure - the annual banquet would keep alive the memory of the family's generosity and emphasize its sociability, while the circus would provide for the pleasure of the most humble of the city's inhabitants.

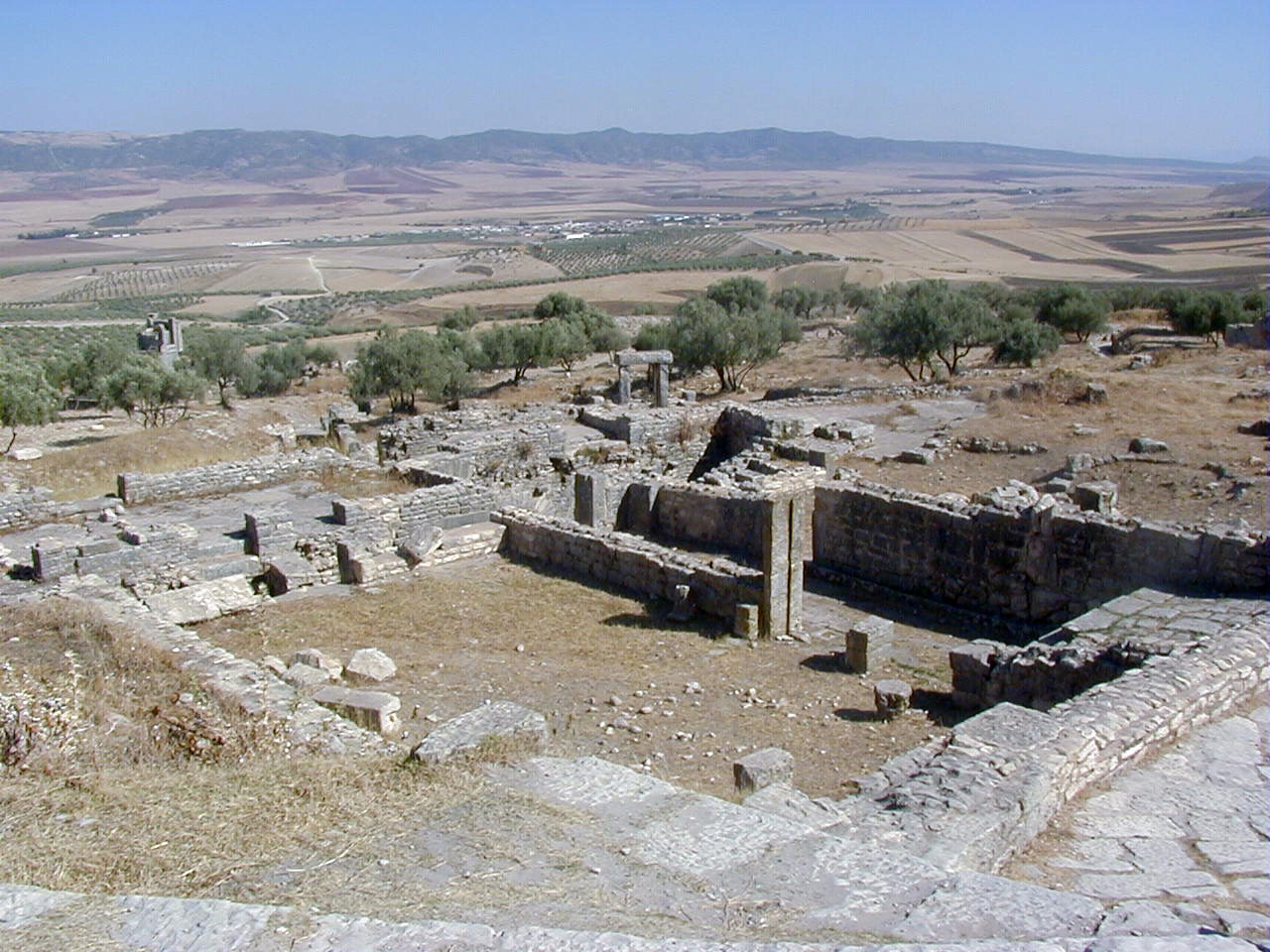
The building believed to be the Temple of Pluto seen from the north

At the end of the 4th century, the Temple of Caracalla's Victory in Germany was transformed into a church. The reservoirs in the courtyard were filled in order to provide space for the faithful, while pulpits were added to the cella. The decoration of the cella was also modified.

=== Temple of Pluto ===
Pluto receives particular honor at Dougga as the city's patron divinity, as demonstrated by the Genius Thuggae.

It is possible that the Temple of Pluto is located near Septimius Severus's triumphal arch in an area of the city that has only been partially excavated as yet, but this hypothesis is not very firm and is based on the discovery of a bust in a courtyard, which has been dated by Poinssot to the 2nd or 3rd century. The associated building was excavated in the 1960s but little is known about the manner in which the excavation was conducted and the stabilization work carried out at the site. A cella with just one niche has been discovered on a podium in the middle of a courtyard and the altar has also been preserved.

An architectural study was carried out between 2000 and 2002, but it did not lead to any excavation work.

=== Temple of Saturn ===
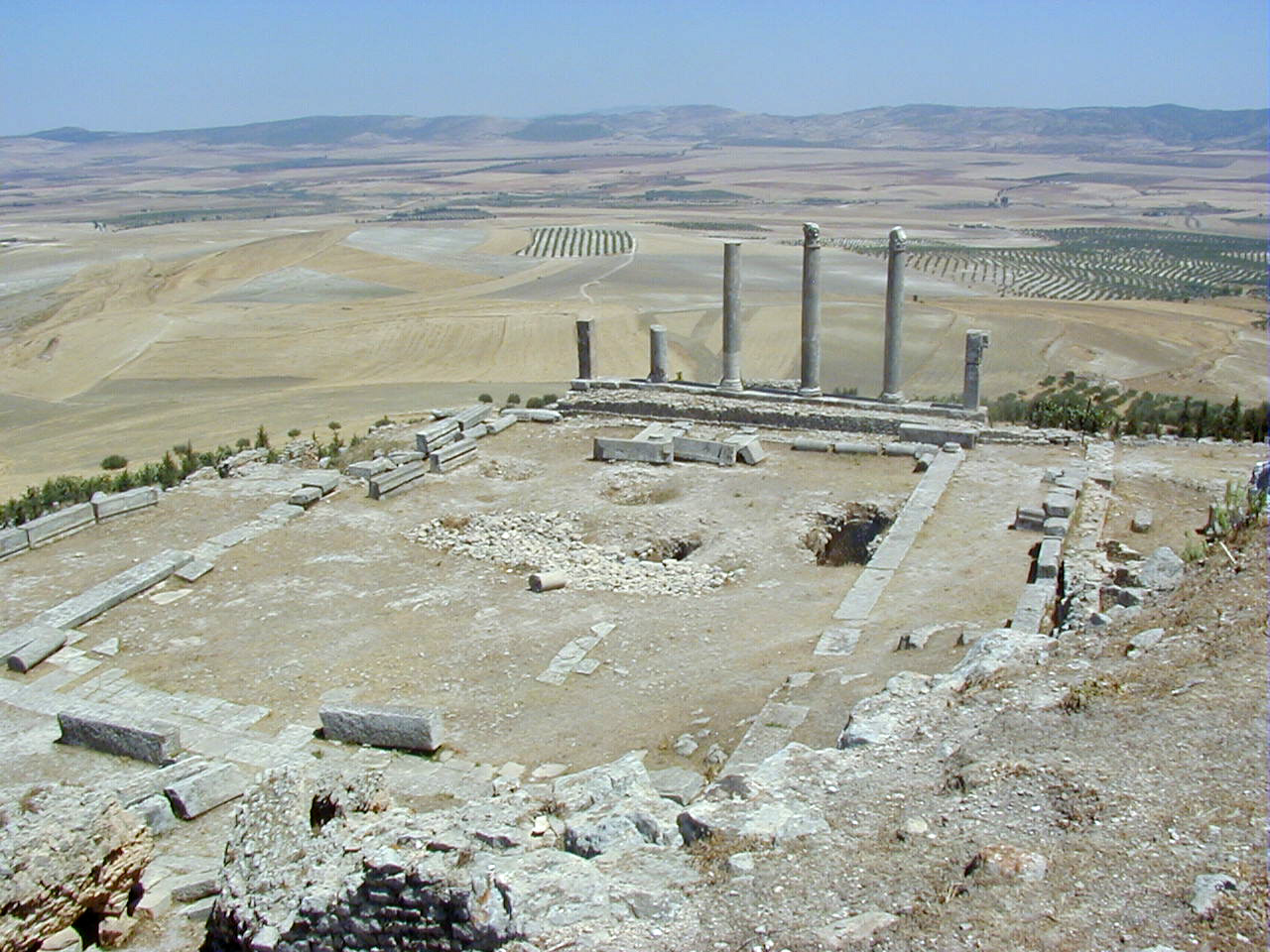
Remains of the Temple of Saturn overlooking the valley.

Saturn was the successor of the Punic Ba'al Hammon and was the attendant (paredros) of Tanit or Heavenly Juno (Juno Caelestis). During the Roman era, the city of Dougga had at least two sanctuaries dedicated to Saturn. The evidence for the existence of one of the two derives mostly from inscriptions found in the city. The second temple, which is the one commonly known as the Temple of Saturn at Dougga, has been excavated. The remains of this temple, which are less significant than those of the capitol or the Temple of Juno Caelestis, are of particular interest because of their location. The ruins lie atop a promontory that overlooks the rich cereal valley of the Oued Khalled, 160 m (520 ft) from the theater and outside the bounds of the city. During the excavation works, remains of a temple of Ba'al Hammon, particularly ritual ditches (favissae) containing ex-votos, were discovered. The Roman temple thus replaced an indigenous sanctuary that dated back at least to the 2nd century BC. This sanctuary consisted essentially of a wide open space designed to receive ex-votos and sacrifices. It was covered over to facilitate the construction of the Temple of Saturn, the ruins of which can still be seen today.

The Roman temple was built during the reign of Septimius Severus. It consists of three cellae, a courtyard with a portico, and a vestibule. Water from the temple roof was collected in cisterns. An inscription provides details about the temple's construction: it was erected using funds bequeathed in the testament of a notable local resident named Lucius Octavius Victor Roscianus at a cost of at least 150,000 sestertii, which seems expensive but may be explained by the extent of the earthworks required to give the temple a solid foundation; these works nonetheless seem to have proven insufficient as work to restore and shore up the edifice appear to have been carried out before it finally fell into ruin.

=== Temple of Juno Caelestis ===
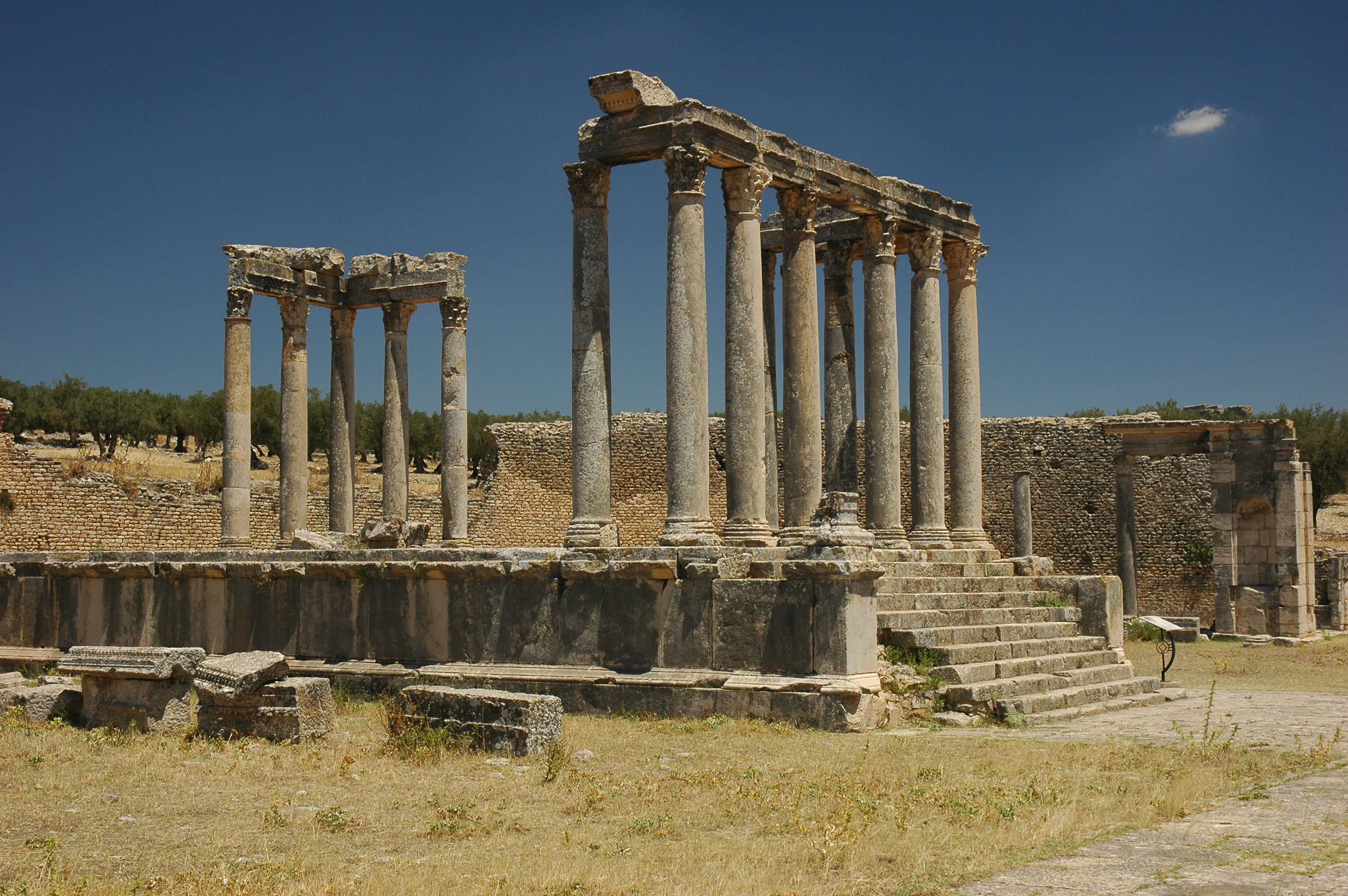
Temple of Juno Caelestis

The Temple of Juno Caelestis, which was built on the outskirts of the city, was described in the 17th century and excavated in the 1890s. Significant restoration work was undertaken between 1904 and 1914, and new studies were carried out between 1999 and 2002.

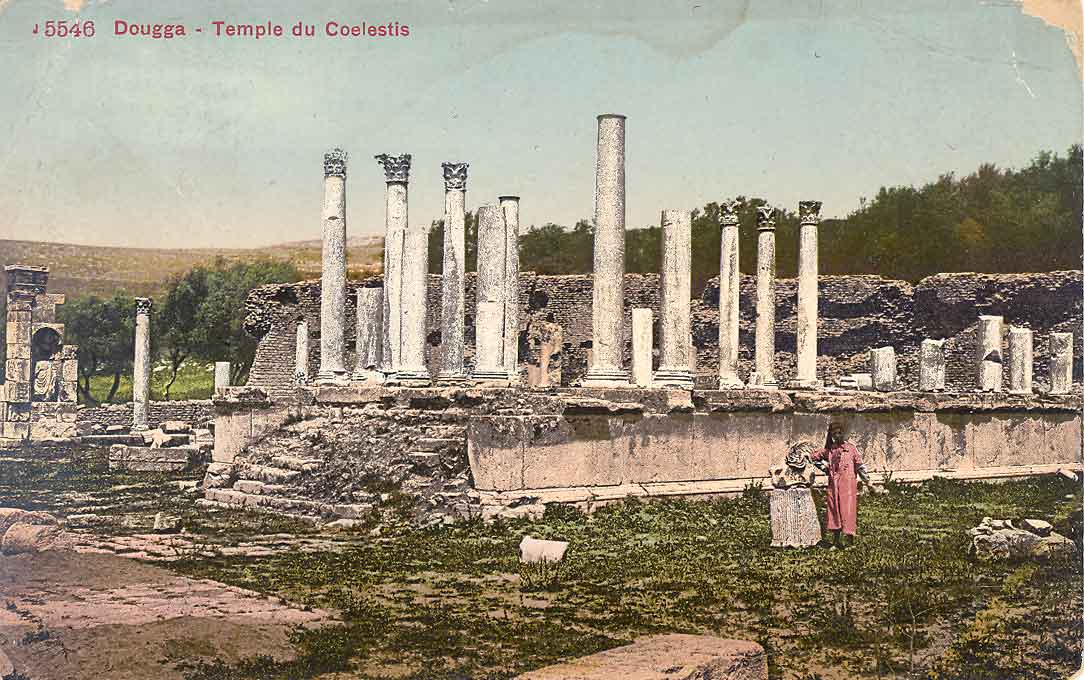
Temple of Juno Caelestis at the start of the 20th century

The temple is dedicated to Heavenly Juno (Juno Caelestis), the successor of the Punic god Tanit. Its well-preserved temenos is demarcated by a wall, a large section of which has been very well preserved. The court is only partially tiled and has two symmetrical doors. A portico with 25 bays runs along the circular section of the temenos. The portico is topped with a frieze depicting the construction of the temple.

The temple in the strict sense of the word stands on a high podium that can be accessed via a series of eleven steps. It is a Corinthian hexastyle peripteros. The pediment features a dedication to Alexander Severus. The cella has been completely lost.

The temple, which was erected between AD 222 and 235, was paid for by a certain Q. Gabinius Rufus Felix, who donated inter alia two silver statues of Juno Caelestis that cost 35,000 sestertii.

The temenos, which is 52 m (171 ft) in diameter, is reminiscent of a crescent moon, the symbol of Juno Caelestis.

=== Dar Lacheb ===
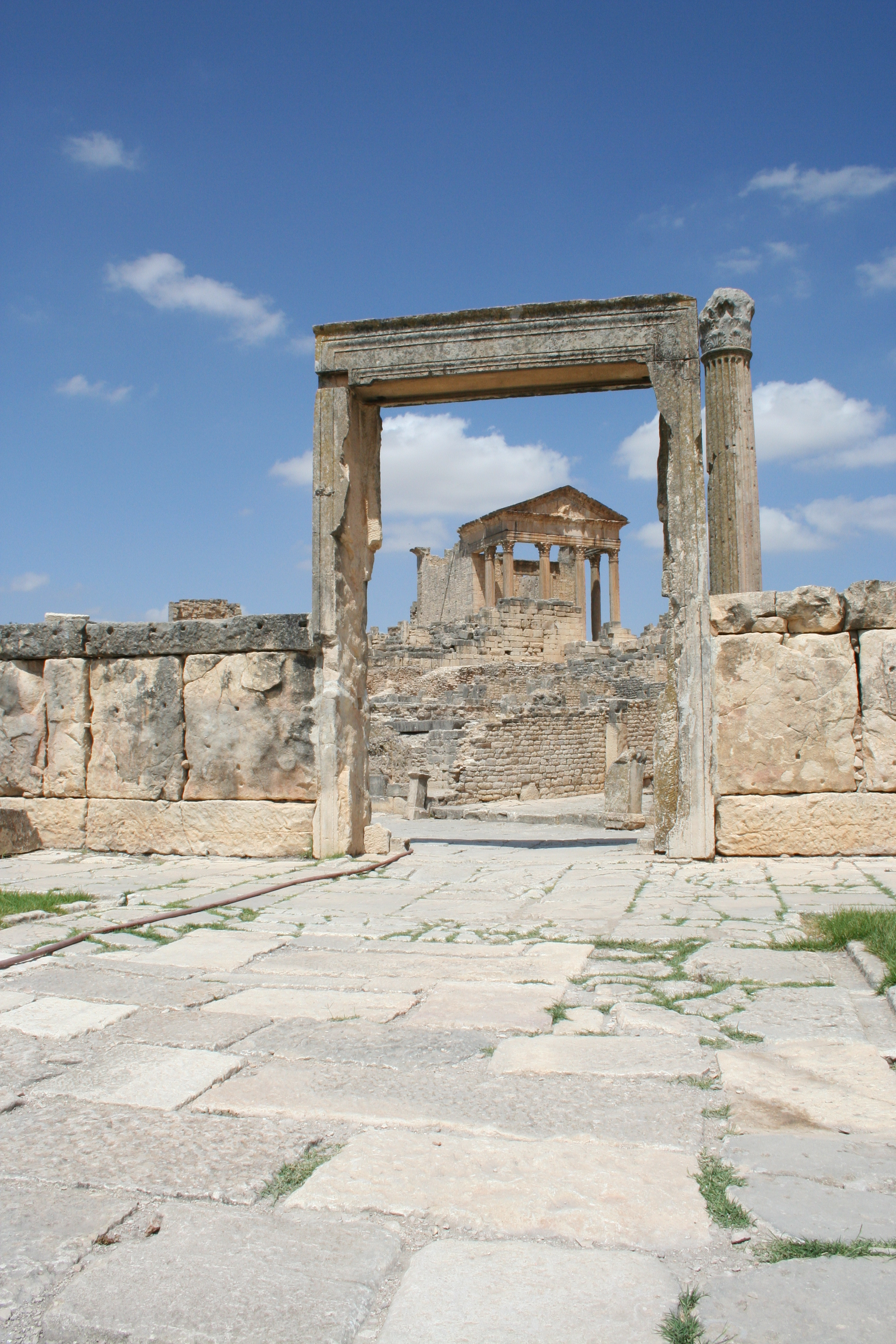
The gate of the Dar Lacheb seen from the interior of the building

The purpose of the edifice known as Dar Lacheb (Latin: Domus Lachebia, "House of Lacheb") has not been clearly identified. St-Amans believes that it is a sanctuary dedicated to Aesculapius, which accords with Poinssot's hypothesis that it is a temple.

Dar Lacheb was excavated at the end of the 19th century by Carton and has not been the subject of further works since 1912. A house that was built nearby re-using antique remains was destroyed at the start of the 20th century.

Dar Lacheb was built between AD 164 and 166, at the same era as the capitol, which is 50 m (160 ft) away. The entrance to the building has been perfectly preserved, as has one of the columns of the entrance porch. The interior consists of a courtyard that was once surrounded with a portico. To the south is the cella of a temple that has been entirely destroyed.

=== Victoria Church ===
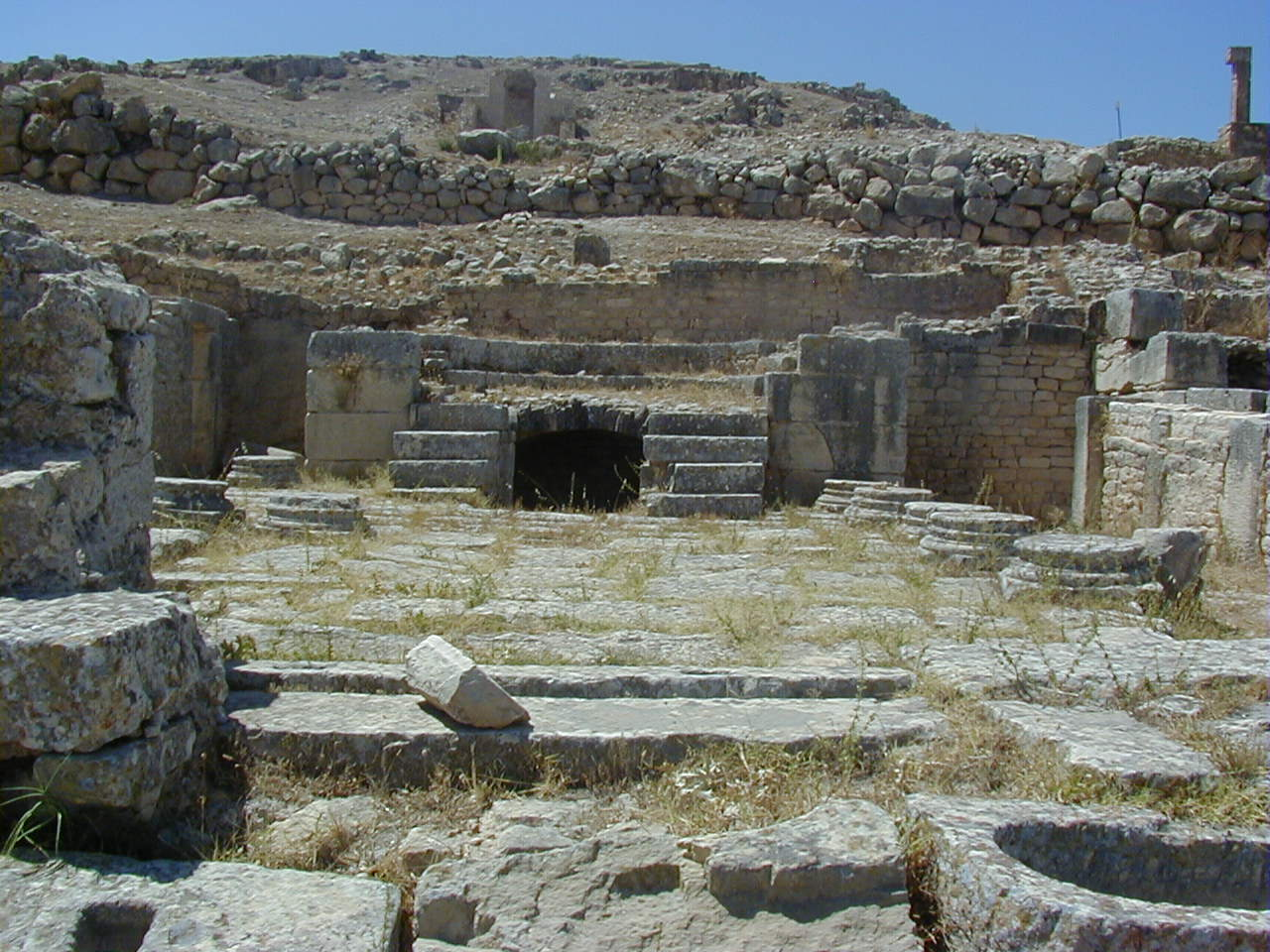
Victoria Church

The Victoria Church, which stands in the northeast of the site, below the Temple of Saturn, is the only Christian building that has been so far excavated at Dougga. At the end of the 4th century or at the start of the 5th century, the Christian community erected the unusually designed little church over a pagan cemetery. The small hypogeum is located nearby.

== Bishopric ==
During antiquity, Thugga was also the seat of the bishop of Thucca Terenbenthina. The bishopric was founded during the Roman Empire and survived through the Arian Vandal Kingdom and Orthodox Byzantine Empire, only ceasing to function with the Muslim conquest of the Maghreb. The diocese was re-founded by the Roman Catholic Church as a titular see in the 20th century.

== Infrastructure ==
=== Cisterns and aqueducts ===
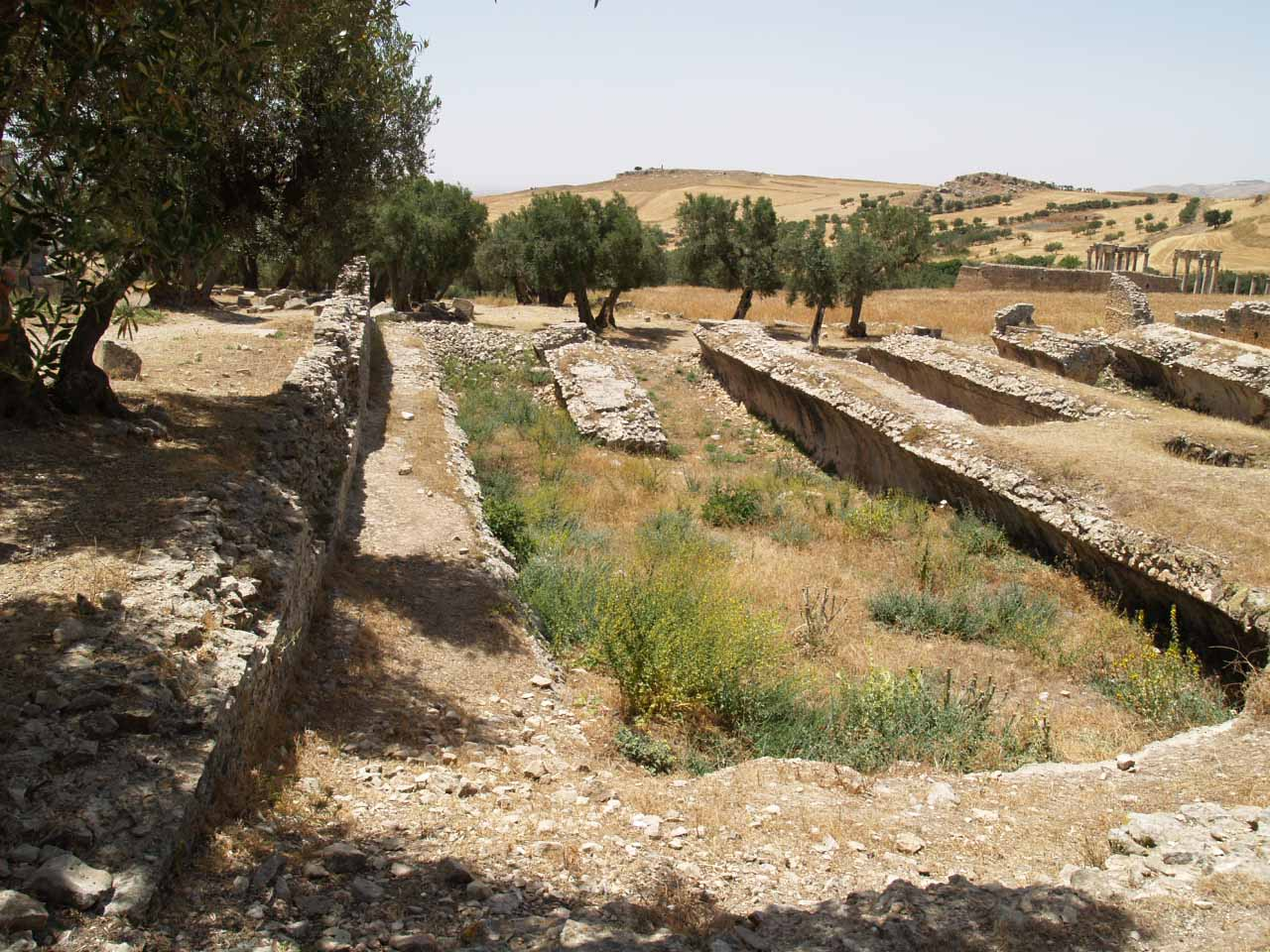
The Aïn El Hammam cisterns in front of the Temple of Juno Caelestis

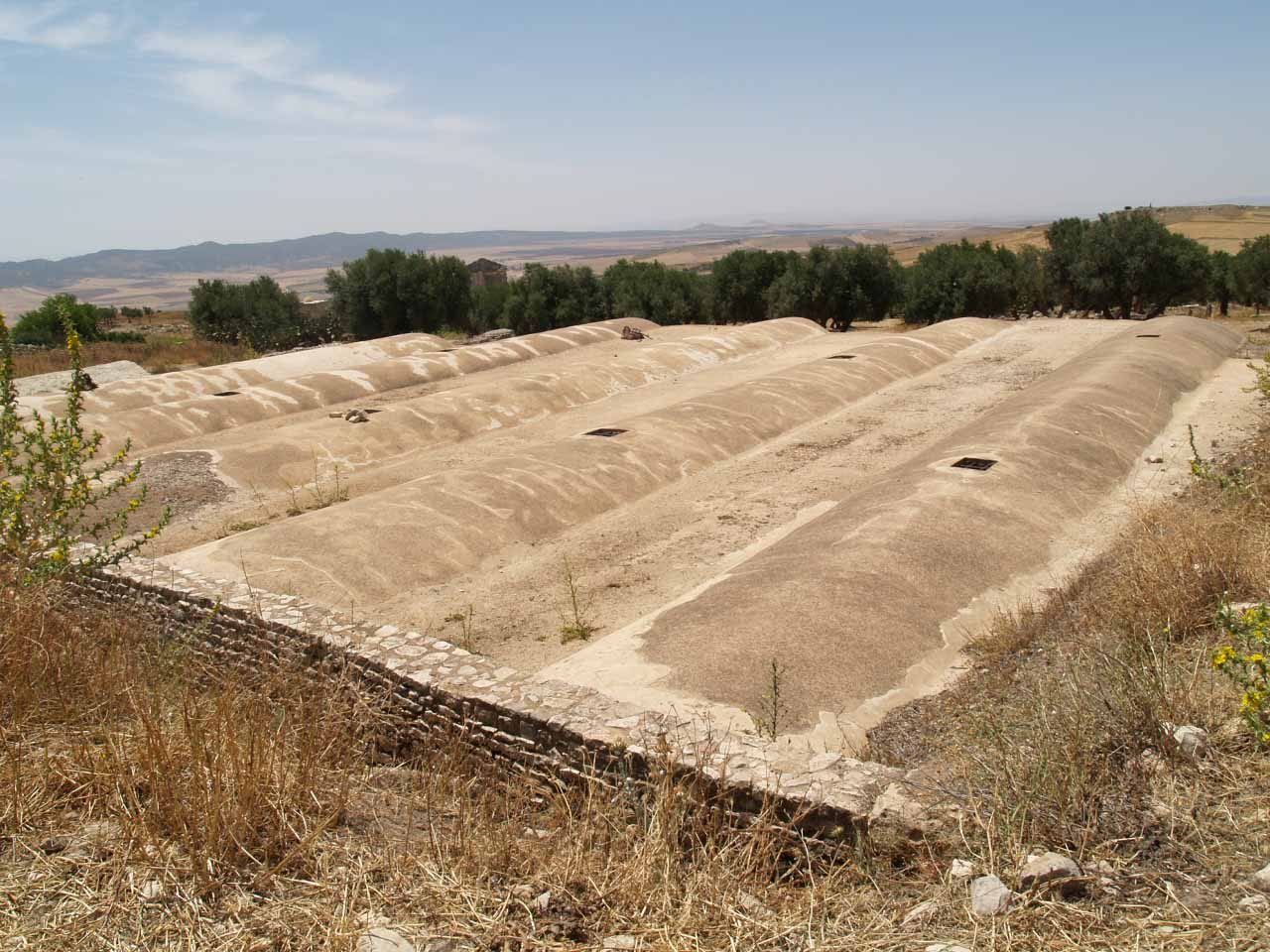
Aïn Mizeb cisterns

Dougga has two networks of cisterns, in the north and in the west, one of which is particularly well preserved. An aqueduct leading to the city, located a short distance from the well-preserved cisterns, is amongst the best preserved examples of this type of structure on the territory of modern-day Tunisia.

The six cisterns of Aïn El Hammam, situated close to the Temple of Juno Caelestis, have a total capacity of 6000 m^{3} but are in ruins. They were fed by a spring 12 km (7.5 mi) away and an aqueduct constructed during the reign of Commodus and restored in the last quarter of the 4th century CE.

This site is still used once annually for a festival celebrating Mokhola, who was a female saint and benefactor of Moroccan origin according to local oral tradition The veneration of Mokhola is accompanied with animal sacrifices. It has been shown that this tradition has pagan origins; the object of veneration was originally the spring, known as fons moccolitanus

The second network of cisterns, the cisterns of Aïn Mizeb, is very well preserved. Located close to the Temple of Minerva, these eight domed reservoirs can hold 9,000 m^{3} (320,000 cu ft) and feature a basin into which they decant. The cisterns are fed by a spring located 200 m (660 ft) away connected via an underground aqueduct.

A final network of secondary cisterns is located in the vicinity of the Aïn Doura Bath, in the south-west of the site.

=== Streets ===
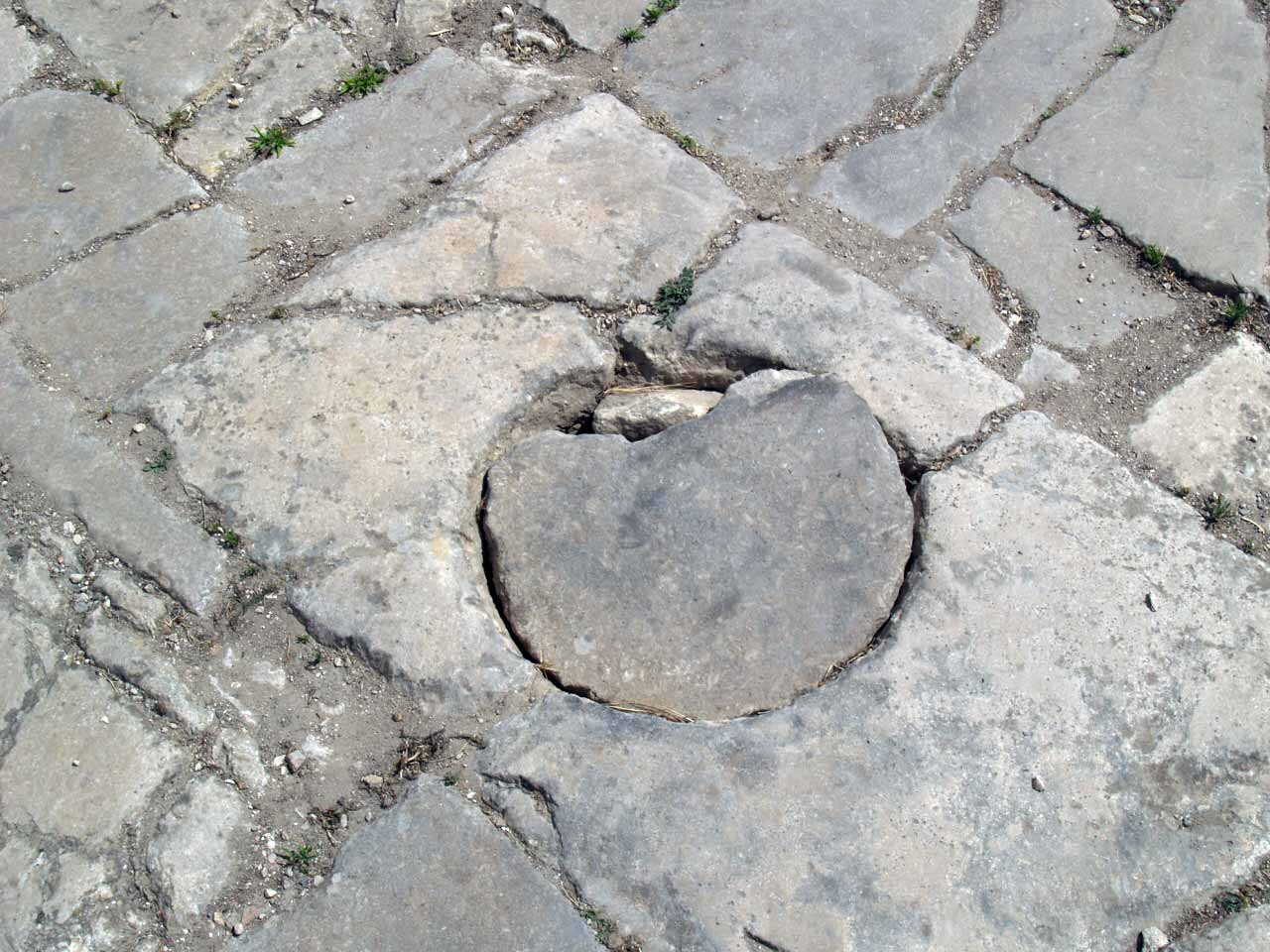
Stone plate giving access to Dougga's Roman sewers

Dougga's streets are not laid out as prescribed by the normal theoretical model of a Roman settlement—around a cardo and a decumanus—as a result of the city's unique design.

The center of the city was probably paved; the streets resembled meandering lanes. The city had sewers, as is evidenced by the access stones that are still in place in the streets. At the foot of the hill, there are traces of streets joining with the main road from Carthage to Theveste

== Discoveries made at Dougga ==
The site at Dougga has offered up numerous works or art, many of which have been removed and placed in museums, most notably the Bardo National Museum in Tunis.

=== Works on site ===
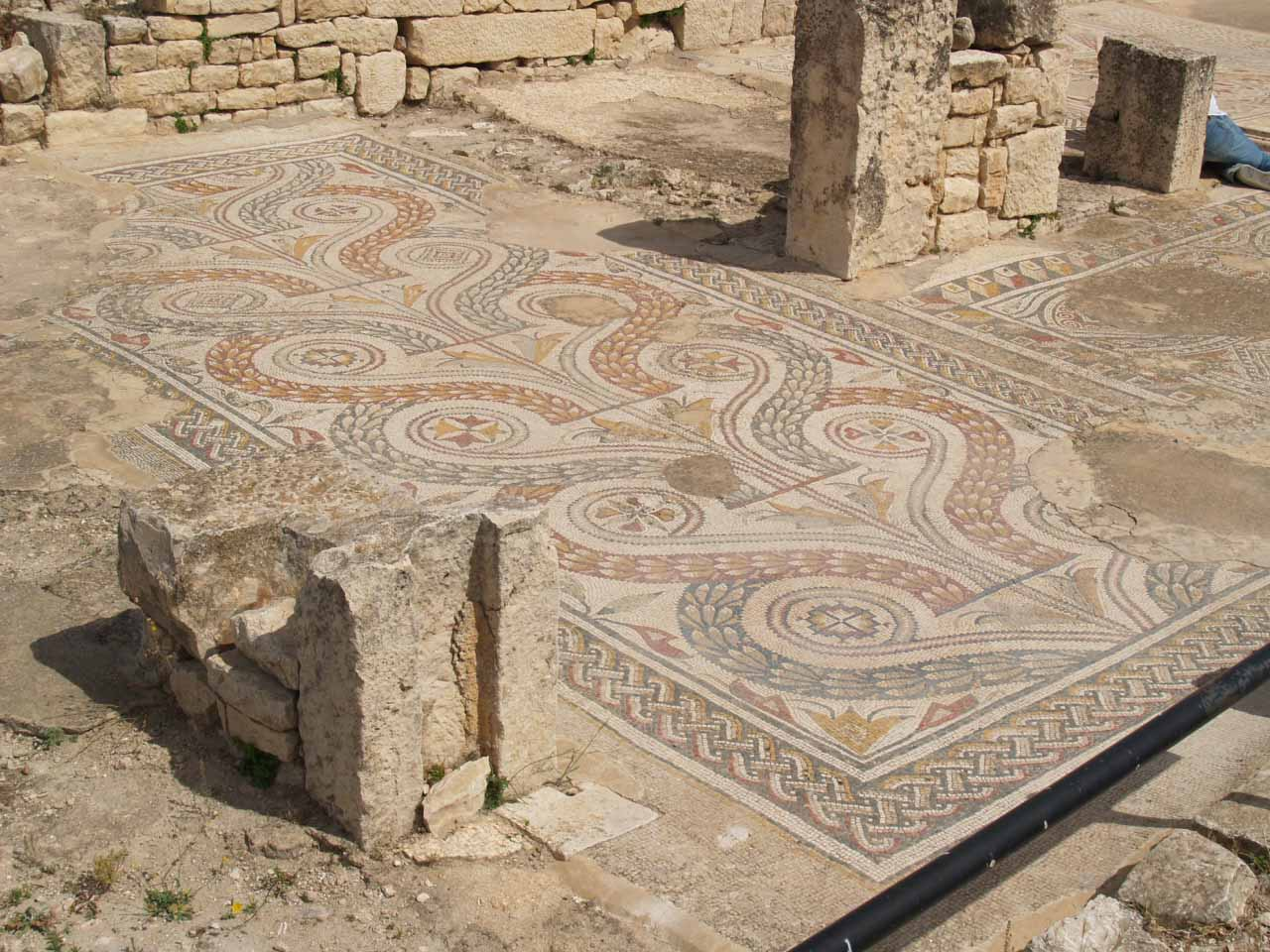
Mosaic floor decoration in the house of Venus

Few works of art have been left on site, with the exception of a sculpture of a togate man (togatus) at the "Square of the Rose of the Winds" and a number of mosaics, including those in the building known as the house of Venus and in particular at the Aïn Doura Bath. This is a consequence of the discovery of Dougga's works of art at a time when archaeological sites were robbed of their treasures and abandoned after a dig. This approach has made it possible to preserve a certain number of mosaics with their colours intact; other mosaics that were uncovered but not removed have suffered due to their exposure to the elements.

A proposal to construct a museum on the site is being studied. It would serve in particular to house recent discoveries and those yet to be made.

=== Works at the Bardo National Museum ===
==== Statues ====
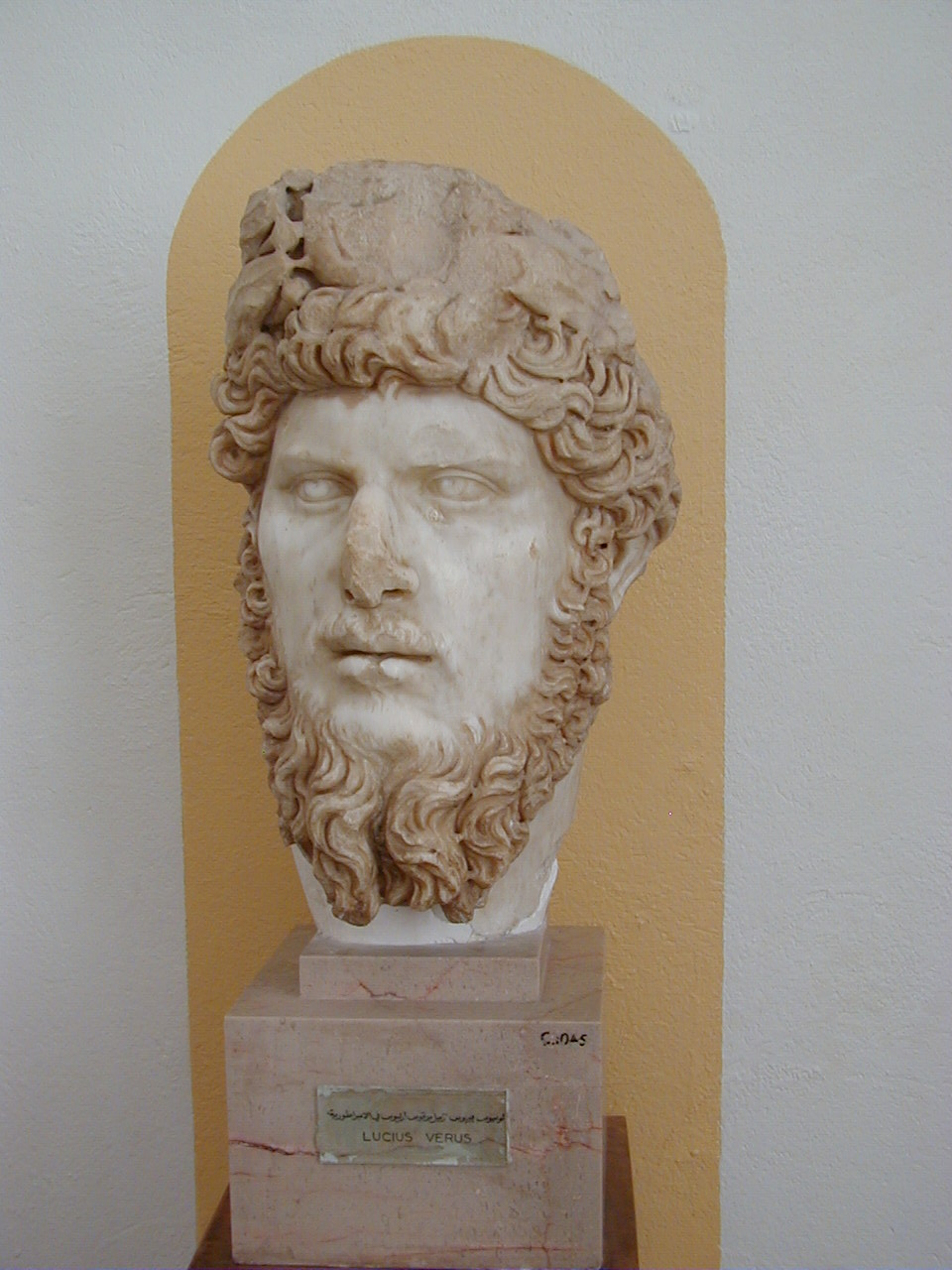
The head of Lucius Verus.

A number of heads of emperors have been discovered during the digs at the site. Amongst these, the portrait of Lucius Verus is particularly noteworthy: he is depicted with a generous head of hair, a full beard and a vivacity that makes it one of the most significant statues yet discovered in Roman Africa. This African masterpiece was realized in marble from Carrara and still has traces of color amongst the hairs.

The Bardo National Museum also houses a togate man (togatus) that dates from the 3rd century. It depicts an aged man, who has a short beard and is dressed in a toga. It seems certain that this is a later work of art reflective of the contemporary taste in art.

==== Mosaics ====
The "butler's mosaic" dating from the middle of the 3rd century features a drinking scene. Two characters are serving two others, who are much smaller, from amphoras on their shoulders. The two amphoras bear the letters ΡΙΕ (Rie, "Drink!" in Ancient Greek) and ΖΗϹΗϹ (Zēsēs, "You will live!"). The amphora bearers are flanked by another two characters, one of whom is carrying another amphora, the other of whom is carrying a branch of laurel and a basket of roses. This depiction is a greeting to all guests and a promise of hospitality. The same is true of another mosaic held at the museum which bears the phrase Omnia tibi felicia ("May everything please you").

The "mosaic of the victorious charioteer" is younger than these works. It dates from the second half of the 4th century, and features the phrase Eros omnia per te ("All things through you, Eros"). The depiction of the charioteer shows great attention to realism, as do the depictions of the horses, two of which are named Amandus and Frunitus after their characters. The horses are arranged symmetrically; such symmetries were very popular at the time. The charioteer is holding a whip, a crown made of branches and a palm branch. The starting blocks of the circus can be seen in the background. This work of art was found in a private residence and it appears that it must be interpreted as a monument donated by the owner celebrating the victory of a charioteer named Eros.

The "Ulysses mosaic" is a work inspired by the Odyssey: the Greek hero Odysseus (Ulysses to the Romans) is seen standing on a boat that is decorated with a human head and a palm branch and that has two sails and a battering ram. Ulysses's hands are tied to the main mast so that he will not succumb to the fatal charm of the sirens' music. Ulysses's companions are seated around him, their ears blocked with wax as described in the legend. Three sirens stand at the base of a rocky crag. They are depicted with the upper body of a woman but the wings and legs of a bird. One of them holds a flute, the second a lyre, while the third, who does not carry an instrument, is believed to be the singing siren. In front of Ulysses's boat, there is a small barque with a fisherman holding a lobster, the depiction of which is over-sized. The mosaic has been dated to around AD 260–268; it was discovered in the "House of Ulysses and the Pirates".

The mosaic "Neptune and the pirates" originates from the same peristyle as the preceding work. It depicts the punishment of pirates on the Tyrrhenian Sea, merging themes linked to Dionysus and more common marine themes. The god is standing, ready to throw his spear. He is supported by a maenad, a satyr and aged Silenus, who is holding the ship's rudder. A leopard is attacking one of the pirates, who are transformed into dolphins as soon as they recognize the divine nature of their adversary. To the left, genii have boarded another ship, while to the right, fishermen are attempting to catch an octopus with a net.

Yacoub attributes a protective function to these two scenes, a means of invoking fate, a practice which is probably based on Hellenic tradition.

The mosaic of the "cyclopses forging Jupiter's thunderbolts" from the floor of a frigidarium depicts three cyclopses: Brontes, Steropes, and Pyracmon or Arges. They are depicted naked, forging Jupiter's thunderbolts, which Vulcan, seated in front of them, is holding on an anvil. This last element has been lost. The mosaic dates to the end of the 3rd century and was discovered in the "Bath of the Cyclopses".

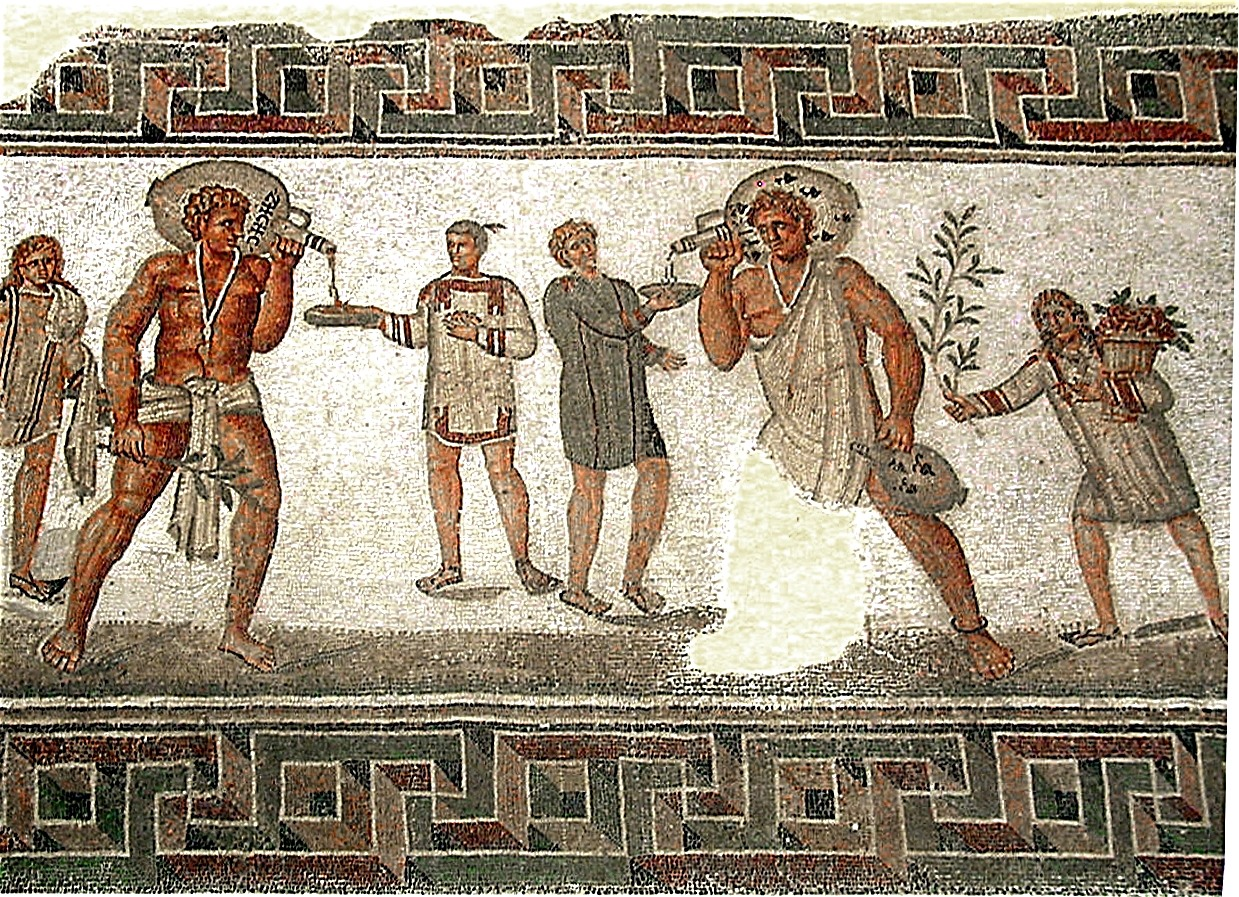
Butler's mosaic.

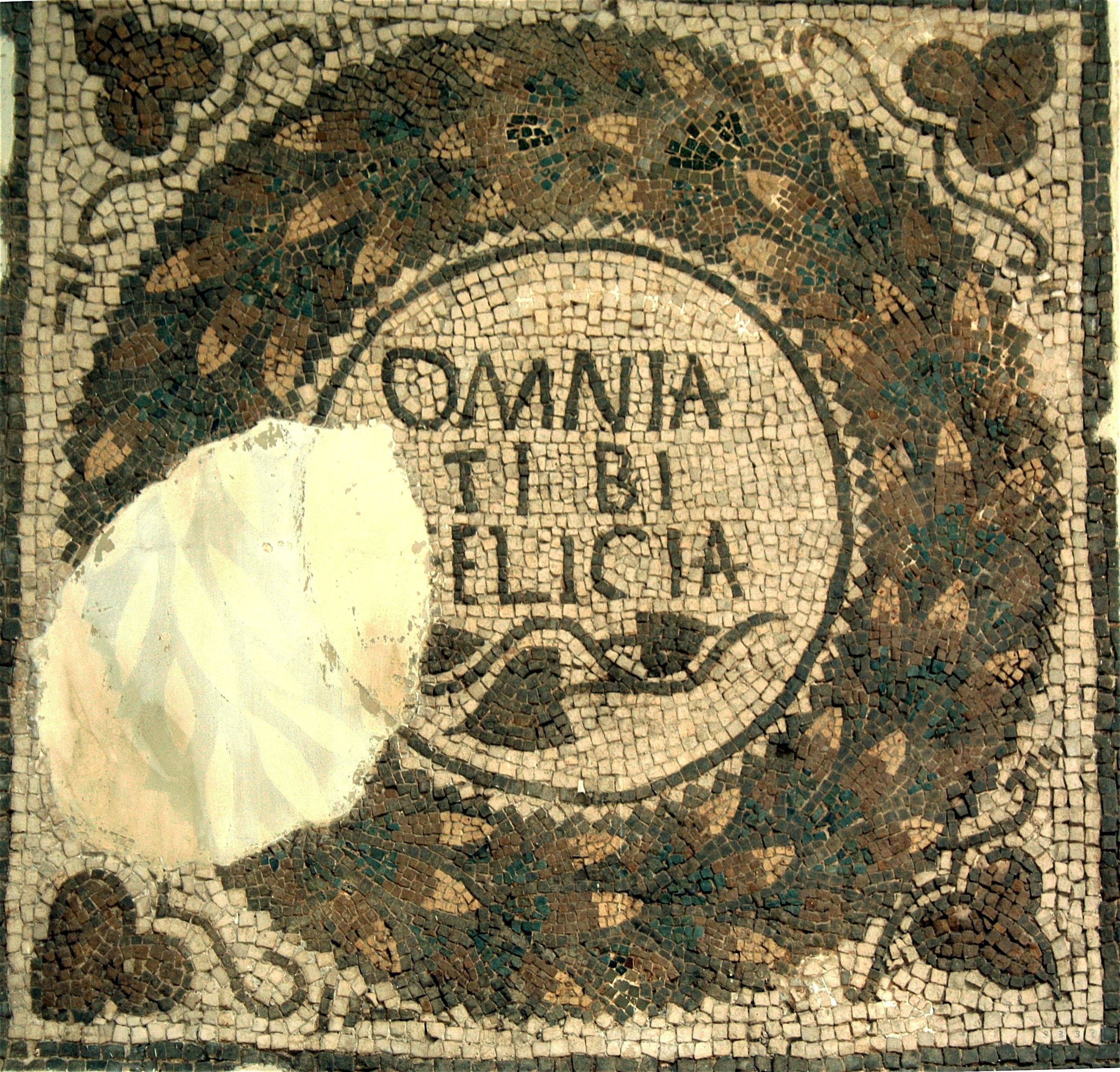
Omnia tibi Felicia.

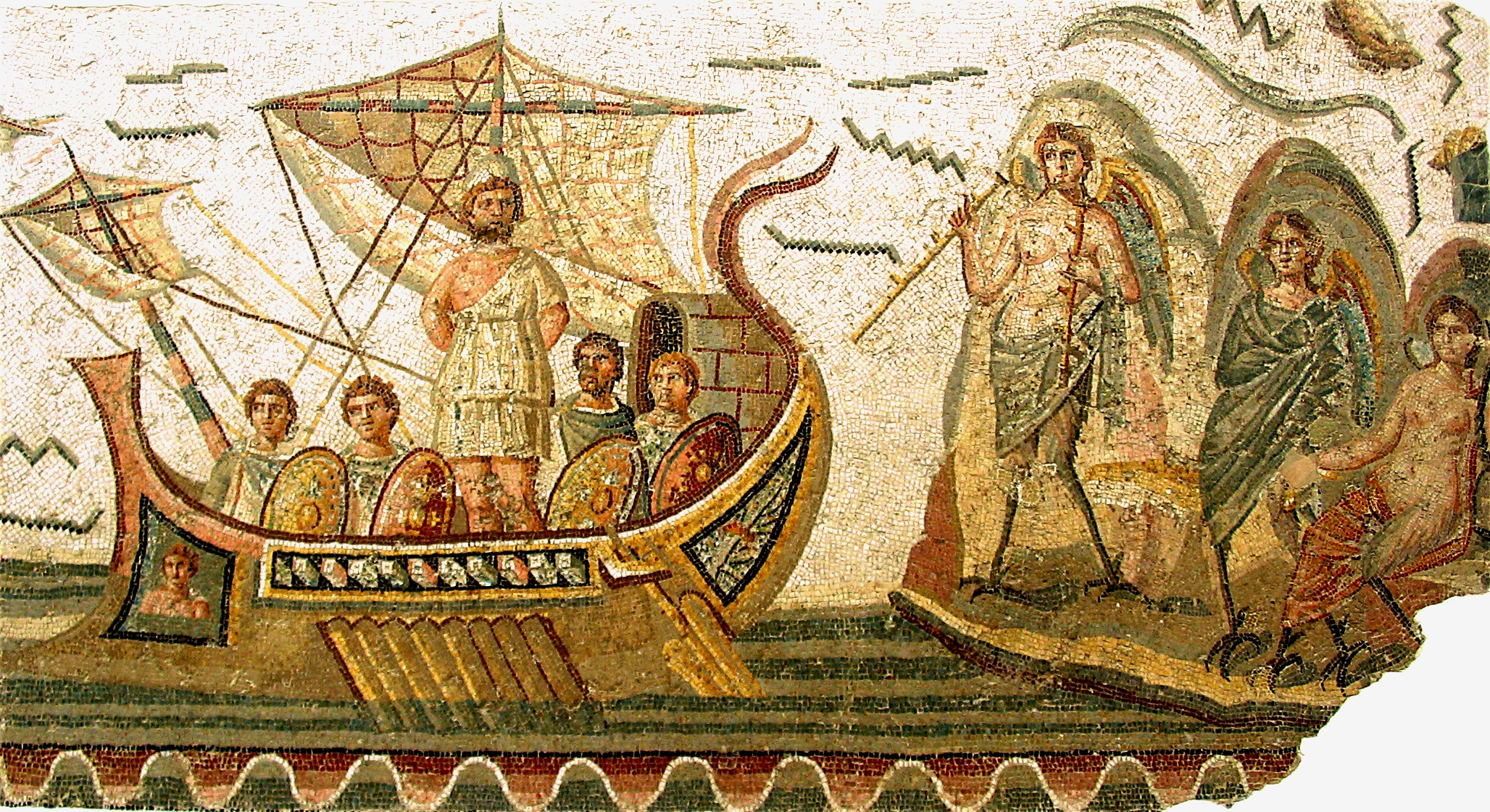
Ulysses and the sirens.

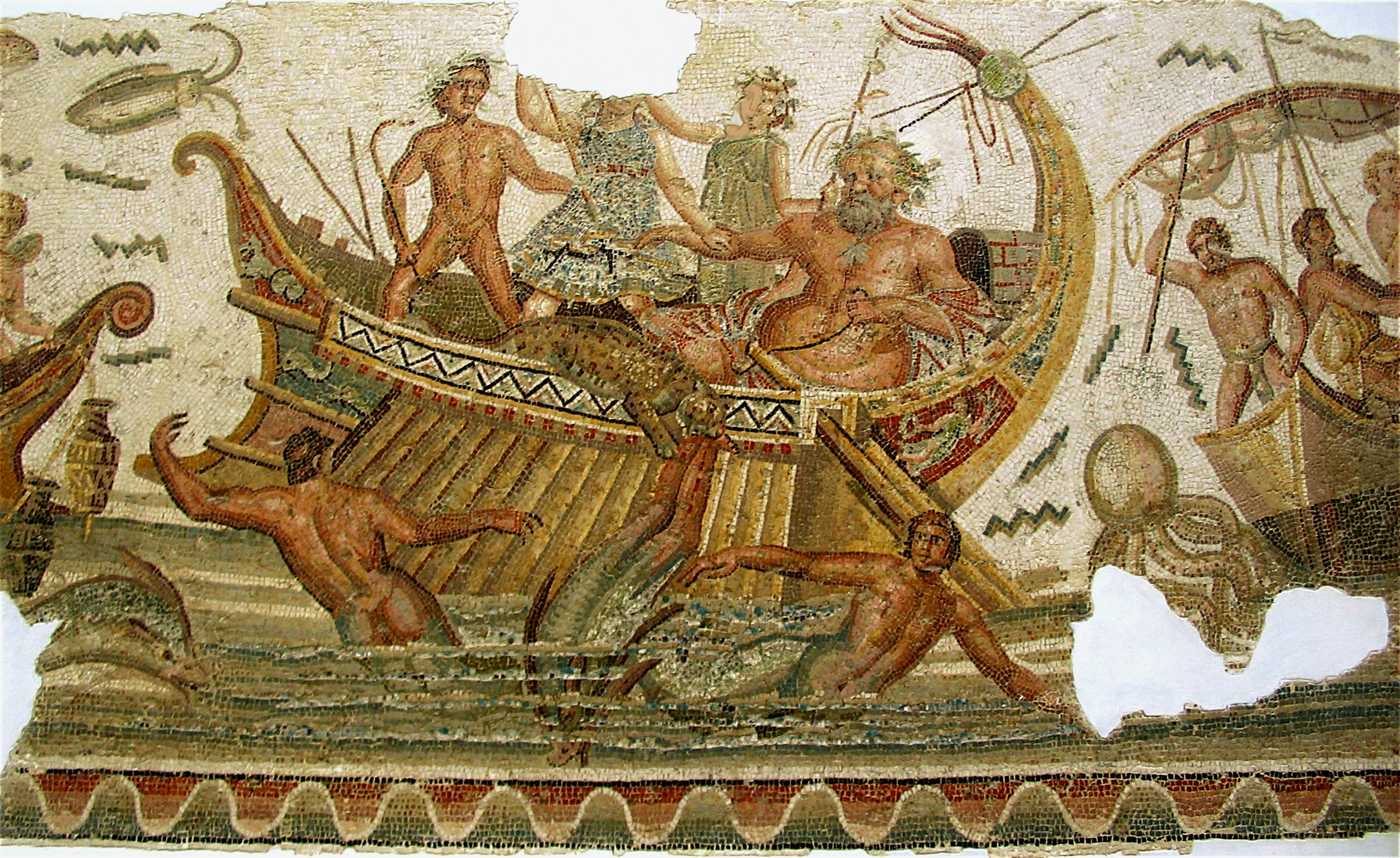
Neptune and the pirates.

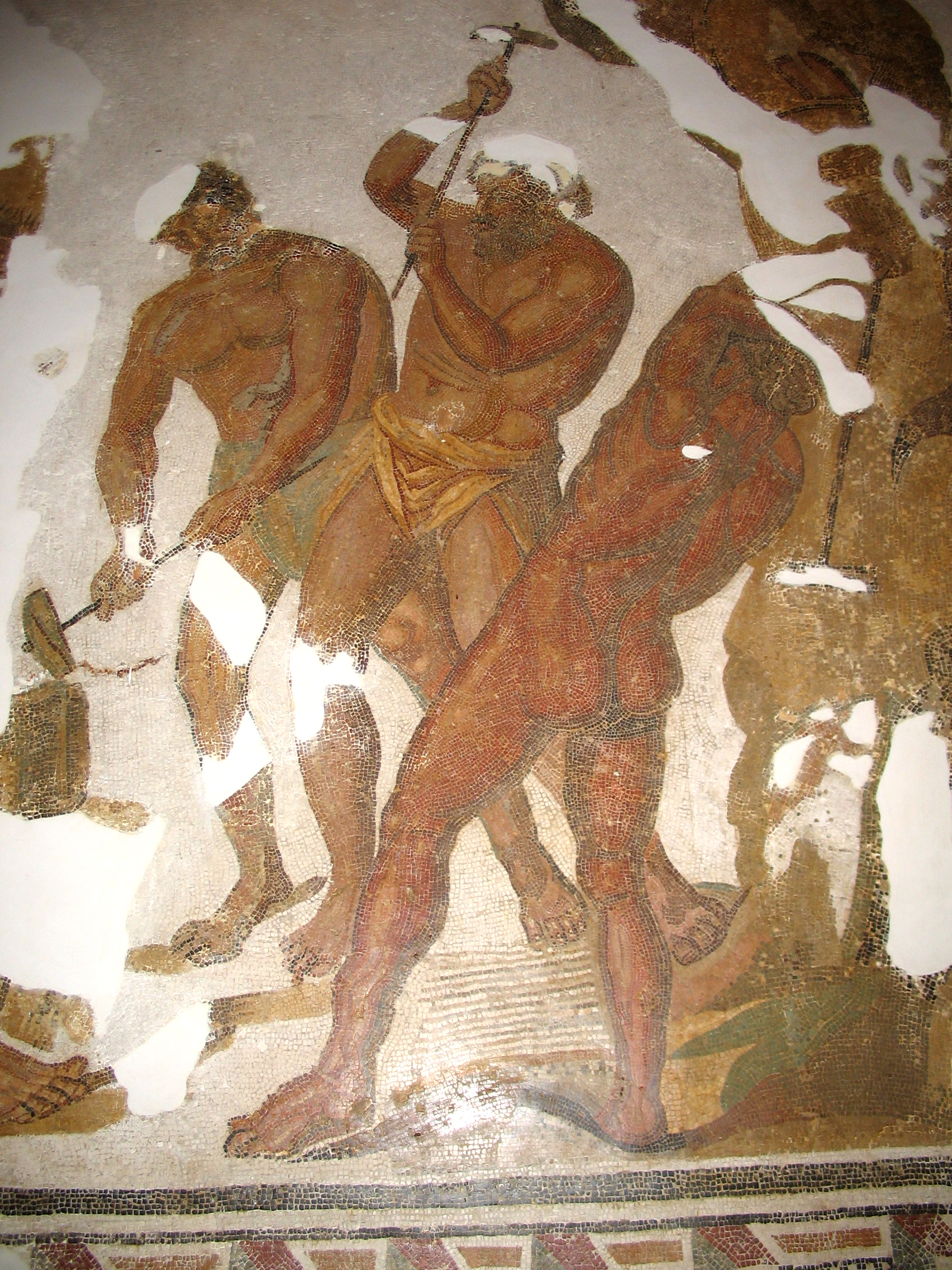
Cyclopses forging Jupiter's thunderbolts

=== Works held in other museums ===
The bilingual inscription from the mausoleum taken by the British consul Read is held by the British Museum. The Punic-Libyan Inscription shows the same text in both the Punic and the Berber languages.

== See also ==
- Numidia
- Carthage
- Roman Africa
- Roman colonies in Berber Africa
