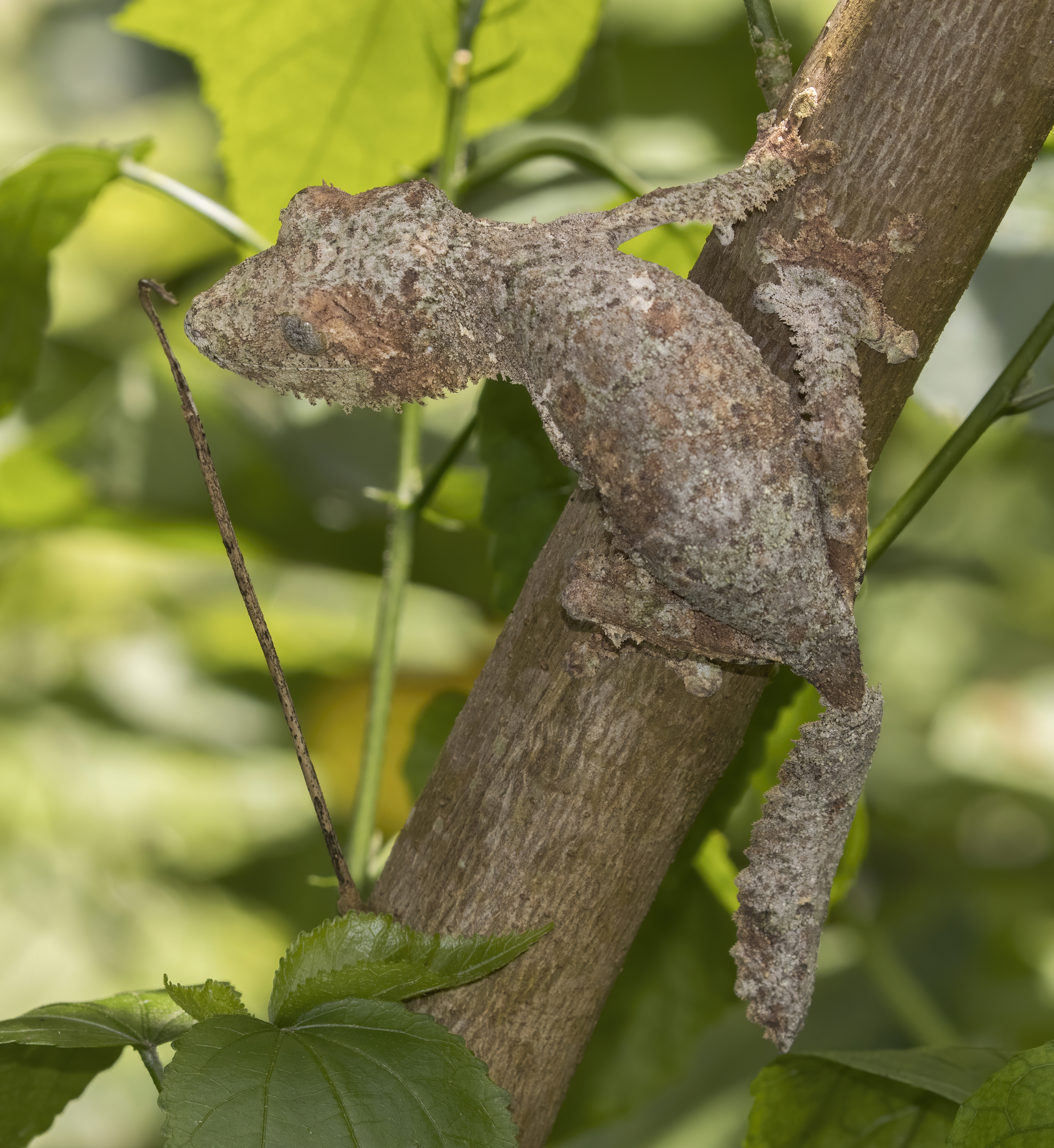
- Uroplatus sikorae in Montagne d'Ambre National Park

Scientific classification
- Kingdom: Animalia
- Phylum: Chordata
- Class: Reptilia
- Order: Squamata
- Suborder: Gekkota
- Family: Gekkonidae
- Subfamily: Uroplatinae; Boulenger, 1884

Genera
- 28; see text.

= Uroplatinae =

Subfamily of lizards

Uroplatinae is a subfamily of geckos in the family Gekkonidae. At least 28 genera have been found to be cluster in a clade together. In the past this was once a monotypic subfamily that included Uroplatus.

Below are the following genera:

- Afroedura
- Afrogecko
- Ailuronyx
- Blaesodactylus
- Calodactylodes
- Christinus
- Chondrodactylus
- Cnemaspis (Indian Subcontinent and Sri Lanka Group)
- Cryptactites
- Ebenavia
- Elasmodactylus
- Geckolepis
- Goggia
- Homopholis
- Kolekanos
- Lygodactylus
- Matoatoa
- Narudasia
- Pachydactylus
- Paragehyra
- Paroedura
- Perochirus
- Phelsuma
- Ptenopus
- Ramigekko
- Rhoptropella
- Rhoptropus
- Urocotyledon
- Uroplatus
