= Fauna of Africa =

Animals living within Africa

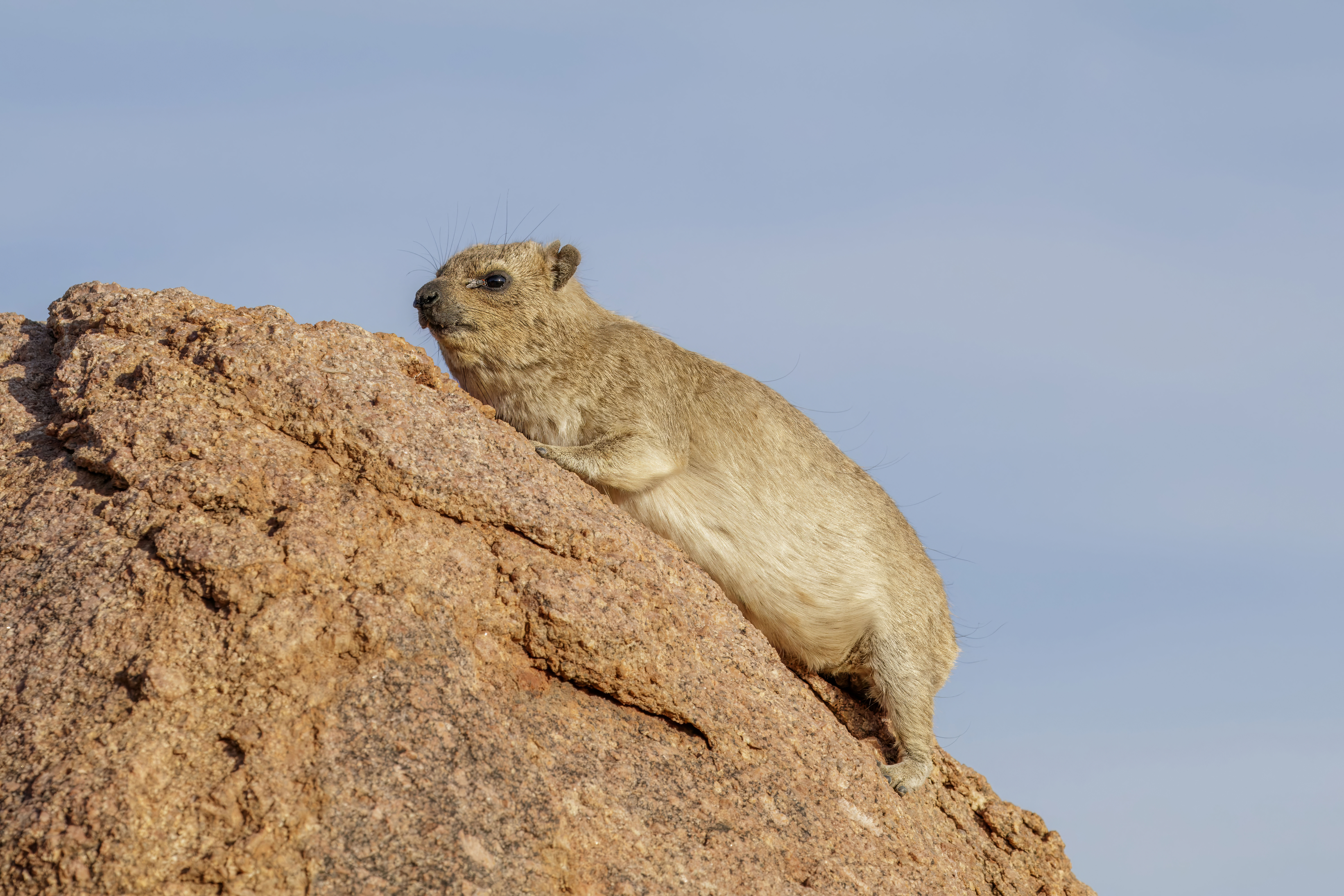
Male hyrax

The fauna of Africa are all the animals living in Africa and its surrounding seas and islands. The more characteristic African fauna are found in the Afro-tropical realm. Lying almost entirely within the tropics, and stretching equally north and south of the equator creates favorable conditions for variety and abundance of wildlife. Africa is home to many of the world's most recognizable fauna such as lions‚ rhinoceroses‚ cheetahs‚ giraffes‚ antelope, hippopotamuses, leopards, zebras‚ and elephants, among many others.

== Origins and history of African fauna ==
Whereas the earliest traces of life in fossil record of Africa date back to the earliest times, the formation of African fauna as we know it today, began with the splitting up of the Gondwana supercontinent in the mid-Mesozoic era.

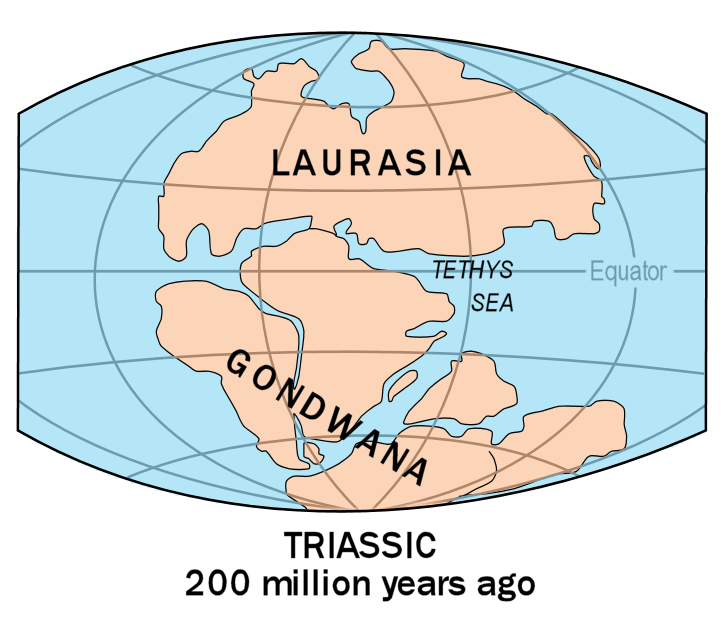
The continents Laurasia-Gondwana 200 million years ago

After that, four to six faunal assemblages, the so-called African Faunal Strata (AFSs) can be distinguished. The isolation of Africa was broken intermittently by discontinuous "filter routes" that linked it to some other Gondwanan continents (Madagascar, South America, and perhaps India), but mainly to Laurasia. Interchanges with Gondwana were rare and mainly "out-of-Africa" dispersals, whereas interchanges with Laurasia were numerous and bidirectional, although mainly from Laurasia to Africa. Despite these connections, isolation resulted in remarkable absences, poor diversity, and emergence of endemic taxa in Africa. Madagascar separated from continental Africa during the break-up of Gondwanaland early in the Cretaceous, but was probably connected to the mainland again in the Eocene.

The first Neogene faunal interchange took place in the Middle Miocene (the introduction of Myocricetodontinae, Democricetodontinae, and Dendromurinae). A major terrestrial faunal exchange between North Africa and Europe began at about 6.1 Ma, some 0.4 Myr before the beginning of the Messinian salinity crisis(for example introduction of Murinae, immigrants from southern Asia).

During the early Tertiary, Africa was covered by a vast evergreen forest inhabited by an endemic forest fauna with many types common to southern Asia. In the Pliocene the climate became dry and most of the forest was destroyed, the forest animals taking refuge in the remaining forest islands. At the same time a broad land-bridge connected Africa with Asia and there was a great invasion of animals of the steppe fauna into Africa. At the beginning of the Pleistocene a moist period set in and much of the forest was renewed while the grassland fauna was divided and isolated, as the forest fauna had previously been. The present forest fauna is therefore of double origin, partly descended of the endemic fauna and partly from steppe forms that adapted themselves to forest life, while the present savanna fauna is similarly explained. The isolation in past times has resulted in the presence of closely related subspecies in widely separated regions Africa, where humans originated, shows much less evidence of loss in the Pleistocene megafaunal extinction, perhaps because co-evolution of large animals alongside early humans provided enough time for them to develop effective defenses. Its situation in the tropics spared it also from Pleistocene glaciations and the climate has not changed much.

== Invertebrates ==
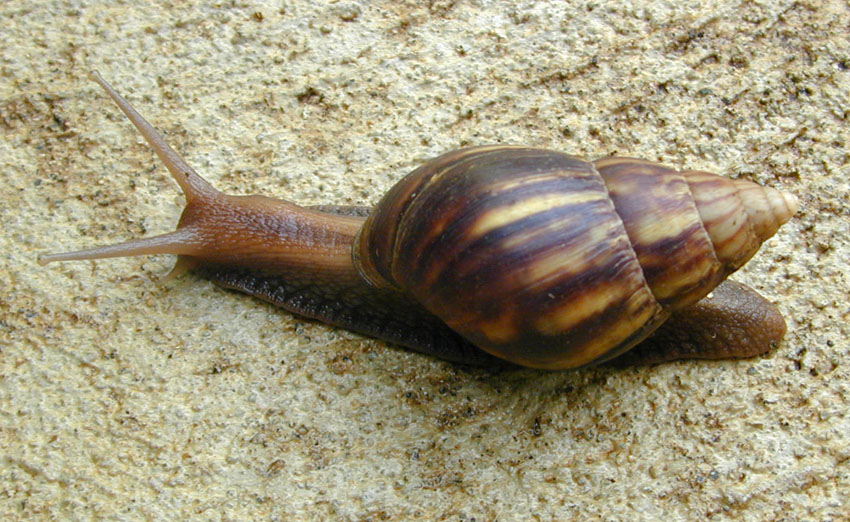
Giant East African snail

There are large gaps in human knowledge about African invertebrates. East Africa has a rich coral fauna with about 400 known species. More than 400 species of echinoderms and 500 species of Bryozoa live there too, as well as one Cubozoan species (Carybdea alata). Of nematodes, the Onchocerca volvulus, Necator americanus, Wuchereria bancrofti and Dracunculus medinensis are human parasites. Some of important plant-parasitic nematodes of crops include Meloidogyne, Pratylenchus, Hirschmanniella, Radopholus, Scutellonema and Helicotylenchus. Of the few Onychophorans, Peripatopsis and Opisthopatus live in Africa. Greatest diversity of freshwater mollusks is found in East African lakes. Of marine snails, less diversity is present in Atlantic coast, more in tropical Western Indian Ocean region (over 3,000 species of gastropods with 81 endemic species). Cowry shells have been used as a money by native Africans. The land snail fauna is especially rich in Afromontane regions, and there are some endemic families in Africa (e.g. Achatinidae, Chlamydephoridae) but other tropical families are common too (Charopidae, Streptaxidae, Cyclophoridae, Subulinidae, Rhytididae). 156 tardigrade species have been found, and about 8,000 species of arachnids. The African millipede Archispirostreptus gigas is one of the largest in the world. 20 genera of freshwater crabs are present.

The soil animal communities of tropical Africa are poorly known. A few ecological studies have been undertaken on macrofauna, mainly in West Africa. Earthworms are being extensively studied in West and South Africa.

=== Insects ===
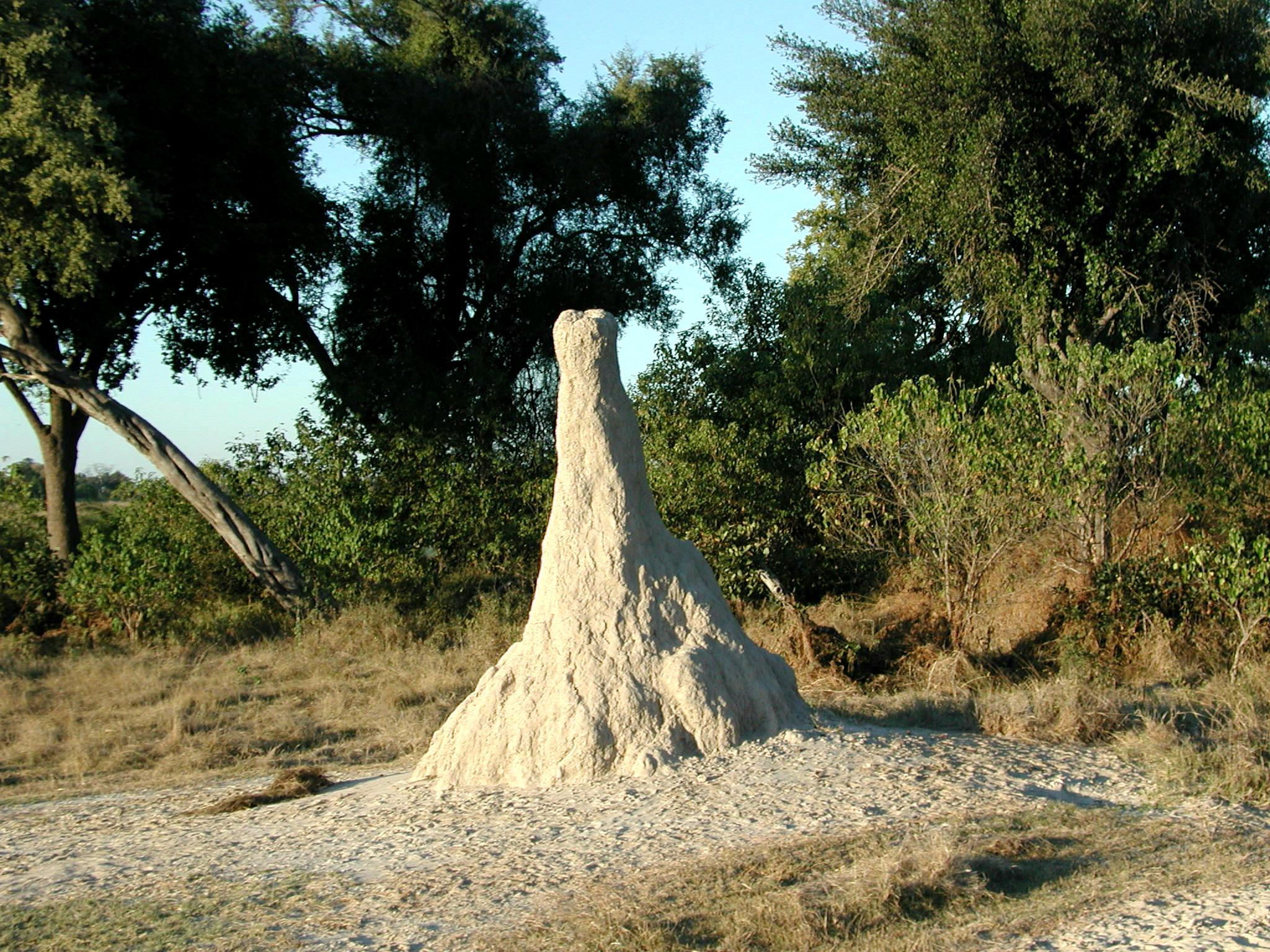
A termite mound in Botswana

Approximately 100,000 species of insects have been described from Sub-Saharan Africa, but there are very few overviews of the fauna as a whole (it has been estimated that the African insects make up about 10-20% of the global insect species richness, and about 15% of new species descriptions come from Afrotropics). The only endemic African insect order is Mantophasmatodea.

About 875 African species of dragonflies have been recorded.

The migratory locust and desert locust have been serious threats to African economies and human welfare.

Africa has the biggest number of termite genera of all continents, and over 1,000 termite species.

Of Diptera, the number of described African species is about 17,000. Natalimyzidae, a new family of acalyptrate flies has been recently described from South Africa. Anopheles gambiae, Aedes aegypti and tsetse fly are important vectors of diseases. 1600 species of bees and 2,000 species of ants among other Hymenopterans are known from Africa.

There live also 3,607 species of butterflies, being the best known group of insects. The caterpillars of mopani moth are part of the South African cuisine. Among the numerous species of African beetles are the famous sacred scarab, the centaurus beetle, manticora tiger beetles and enormous Goliath beetles.

=== Butterflies ===
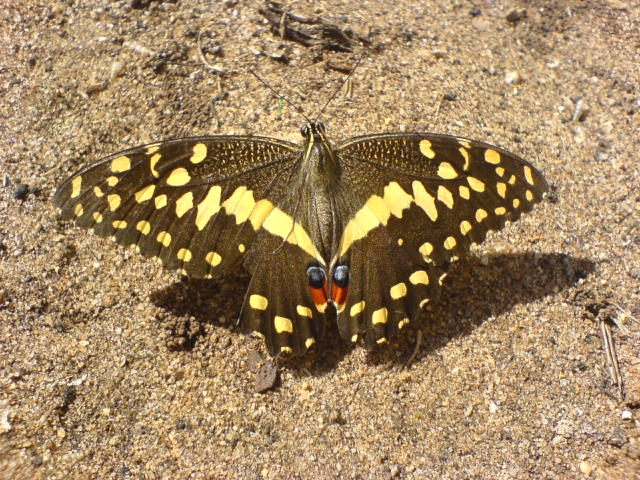
A citrus swallowtail from Tanzania

Hotspots for butterflies include the Congolian forests and the Guinean forest-savanna mosaic. Some butterflies (Hamanumida daedalus, Precis, Eurema) are grassland or savannah specialists. Many of these have very large populations and a vast range. South Africa has one of the highest proportions of Lycaenid butterflies (48%) for any region in the world with many species restricted in range. North Africa is in the Palaearctic region and has a different species assemblage.

Genera which are species rich in Africa include Charaxes, Acraea, Colotis and Papilio, most notably Papilio antimachus and Papilio zalmoxis. The tribe Liptenini is endemic to the Afrotropics and includes species rich genera such as Ornipholidotos, Liptenara, Pentila, Baliochila, Hypophytala, Teriomima, Deloneura and Mimacraea. The Miletinae are mostly African, notably Lachnocnema. Other endemic lycaenids include the genus Alaena. Endemic Nymphalidae include Euphaedra, Bebearia, Heteropsis, Precis, Pseudacraea, Bicyclus and Euxanthe. Endemic Pieridae include Pseudopontia paradoxa and Mylothris. Endemic skippers include Sarangesaand Kedestes. The highest species diversity is in the Democratic Republic of the Congo, home to 2,040 species 181 of which are endemic.

== Fish ==
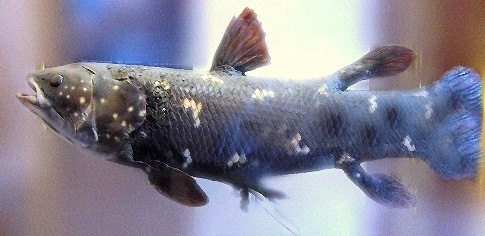
Latimeria, a living member of a long-thought-extinct group of fish

Africa is the richest continent of freshwater fish, with about 3,000 species. The East African Great Lakes (Victoria, Malawi, and Tanganyika) are the center of biodiversity of many fish, especially cichlids (they harbor more than two-thirds of the estimated 2,000 species in the family). The West African coastal rivers region covers only a fraction of West Africa, but harbours 322 of West Africa's fish species, with 247 being restricted to this area and 129 being restricted to even smaller ranges. The central river's fauna comprises 194 fish species, with 119 endemics and only 33 restricted to small areas. The marine diversity is greatest near the Indian Ocean shore with about 2,000 species.

Characteristic to African fauna are Perciformes (Lates, tilapias, Dichistiidae, Anabantidae, Mudskippers, Parachanna, Acentrogobius, Croilia, Glossogobius, Hemichromis, Nanochromis, Oligolepis, Oreochromis, Redigobius, Sarotherodon, Stenogobius and others), Gonorhynchiformes (Kneriidae, Phractolaemidae), some lungfishes (Protopterus), many Characiformes (Distichodontidae, Hepsetidae, Citharinidae, Alestiidae), Osteoglossiformes (African knifefish, Gymnarchidae, Mormyridae, Pantodontidae), Siluriformes (Amphiliidae, Anchariidae, Ariidae, Austroglanididae, Clariidae, Claroteidae, Malapteruridae, Mochokidae, Schilbeidae), Osmeriformes (Galaxiidae), Cyprinodontiformes (Aplocheilidae, Poeciliidae) and Cypriniformes (Labeobarbus, Pseudobarbus, Tanakia and others).

== Amphibians ==
Endemic to Africa are the families Arthroleptidae, Astylosternidae, Heleophrynidae, Hemisotidae, Hyperoliidae, Petropedetidae, Mantellidae. Also widespread are Bufonidae (Bufo, Churamiti, Capensibufo, Mertensophryne, Nectophryne, Nectophrynoides, Schismaderma, Stephopaedes, Werneria, Wolterstorffina), Microhylidae (Breviceps, Callulina, Probreviceps, Cophylinae, Dyscophus, Melanobatrachinae, Scaphiophryninae), Rhacophoridae (Chiromantis), Ranidae (Afrana, Amietia, Amnirana, Aubria, Conraua, Hildebrandtia, Lanzarana, Ptychadena, Strongylopus, Tomopterna) and Pipidae (Hymenochirus, Pseudhymenochirus, Xenopus). The 2002–2004 'Global Amphibian Assessment' by IUCN, Conservation International and NatureServe revealed that for only about 50% of the Afrotropical amphibians, there is least concern about their conservation status; approximately 130 species are endangered, about one-fourth of which are at a critical stage. Almost all of the amphibians of Madagascar (238 species) are endemic to that region. The West African goliath frog is the largest frog species in the world.

== Reptiles ==
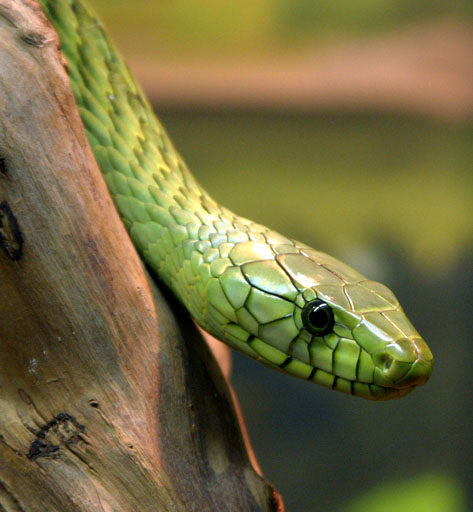
Western green mamba, a venomous snake

The center of chameleon diversity is Madagascar. Snakes found in Africa include atractaspidids, elapids (cobras, Aspidelaps, Boulengerina, Dendroaspis, Elapsoidea, Hemachatus, Homoroselaps and Paranaja), viperines, (Atheris, Bitis, Cerastes, Causus, Echis, Macrovipera, Montatheris, Proatheris, Vipera), colubrids (Dendrolycus, Dispholidus, Gonionotophis, Grayia, Hormonotus, Lamprophis, Psammophis, Leioheterodon, Madagascarophis, Poecilopholis, Dasypeltis etc.), the pythonids (Python), typhlopids (Typhlops) and leptotyphlopids (Leptotyphlops, Rhinoleptus).

Of the lizards, many species of geckos (day geckos, Afroedura, Afrogecko, Colopus, Pachydactylus, Hemidactylus, Narudasia, Paroedura, Pristurus, Quedenfeldtia, Rhoptropus, Tropiocolotes, Uroplatus), Cordylidae, as well as Lacertidae (Nucras, Lacerta, Mesalina, Acanthodactylus, Pedioplanis), Agamas, skinks, plated lizards and some monitor lizards are common. There are 12 genera and 58 species of African amphisbaenians (e.g. Chirindia, Zygaspis, Monopeltis, Dalophia).

Several genera of tortoises (Kinixys, Pelusios, Psammobates, Geochelone, Homopus, Chersina), turtles (Pelomedusidae, Cyclanorbis, Cycloderma, Erymnochelys), and 5-7 species of crocodiles (the Nile crocodile, the West African crocodile, two species of slender-snouted crocodile, and 1-3 species of dwarf crocodile) are also present.

== Birds ==
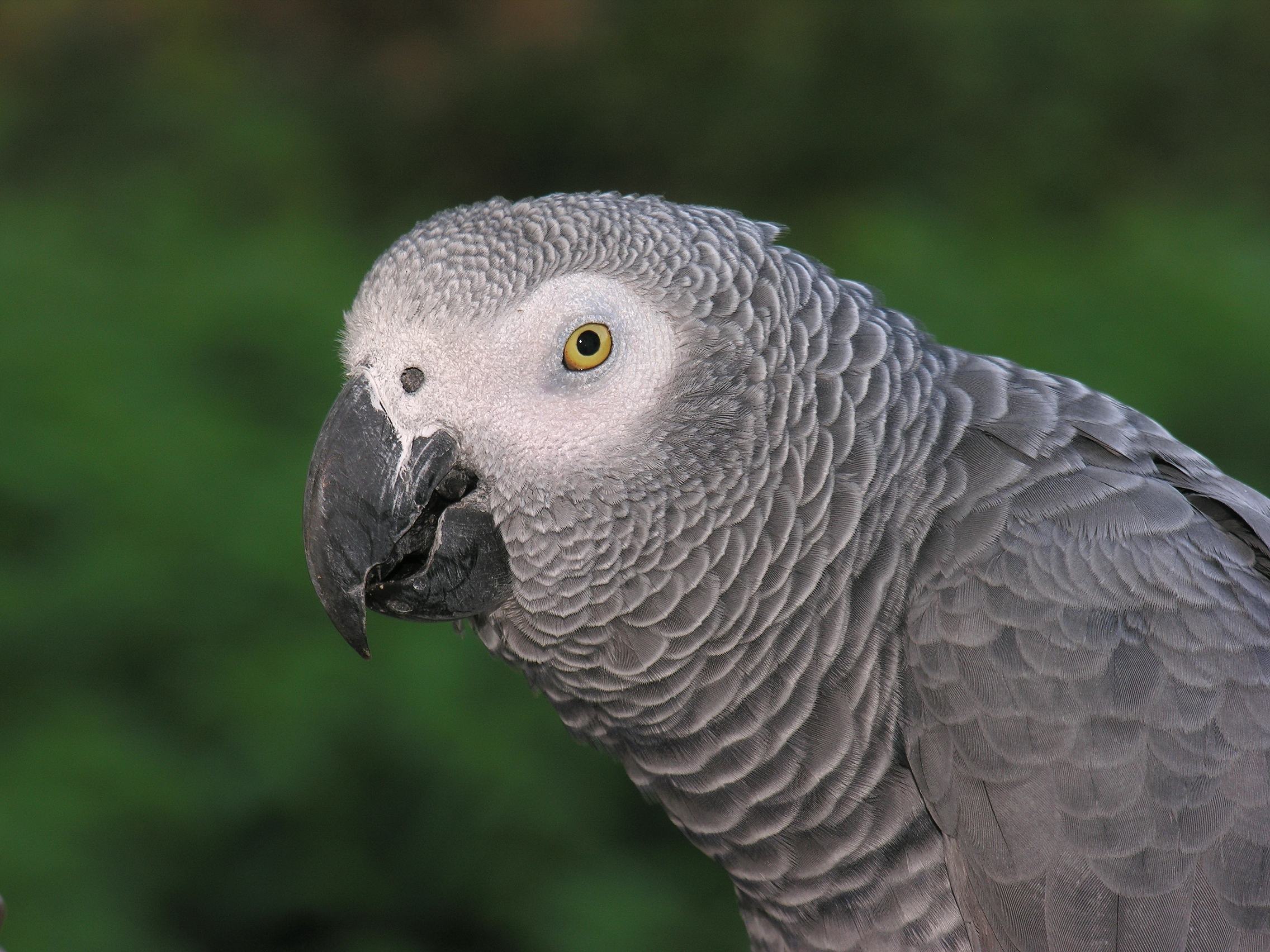
The grey parrot is native to West-African rainforests.

There live (temporarily or permanently) more than 2600 bird species in Africa (about 1500 of them passerines). Some 114 of them are threatened species.

The Afrotropic has various endemic bird families, including ostriches (Struthionidae), mesites, sunbirds, secretary bird (Sagittariidae), guineafowl (Numididae), and mousebirds (Coliidae). Also, several families of passerines are limited to the Afrotropics. These include rock-jumpers (Chaetopidae), bushshrikes (Malaconotidae), wattle-eyes, (Platysteiridae) and rockfowl (Picathartidae). Other common birds include parrots (lovebirds, Poicephalus, Psittacus), various cranes (crowned cranes, blue crane, wattled crane), storks (marabous, Abdim's stork, saddle-billed stork), herons (slaty egret, black heron, goliath heron), shoebill, bustards (kori bustard, Neotis, Eupodotis, Lissotis), sandgrouse (Pterocles), Coraciiformes (bee-eaters, hornbills, Ceratogymna), phasians, Congo peafowl, blue quail, harlequin quail, stone partridge, Madagascar partridge). The woodpeckers and allies include honeyguides, African barbets, African piculet, ground woodpecker, Dendropicos and Campethera. The birds of prey include the buzzards, harriers, Old World vultures, bateleur, Circaetus, Melierax and others. Trogons are represented by one genus (Apaloderma). African penguin is the only penguin species. Madagascar was once home to the now extinct elephant birds. Mauritius was once home to the now extinct endemic bird species, the being notably the Dodo bird and also the Mauritius blue pigeon.

Africa is home to numerous songbirds (pipits, orioles, antpeckers, brubrus, cisticolas, nigritas, olivebacks, pytilias, green-backed twinspot, crimson-wings, seedcrackers, bluebills, firefinches, waxbills, amandavas, quailfinches, munias, weavers, tit-hylia, Amadina, Anthoscopus, Mirafra, Hypargos, Eremomela, Euschistospiza, Erythrocercus, Malimbus, Pitta, Uraeginthus, pied crow, white-necked raven, thick-billed raven, Cape crow and others). The red-billed quelea is the most abundant bird species in the world.

Of the 589 species of birds (excluding seabirds) that breed in the Palaearctic (temperate Europe and Asia), 40% spend the winter elsewhere. Of those species that leave for the winter, 98% travel south to Africa.

== Mammals ==
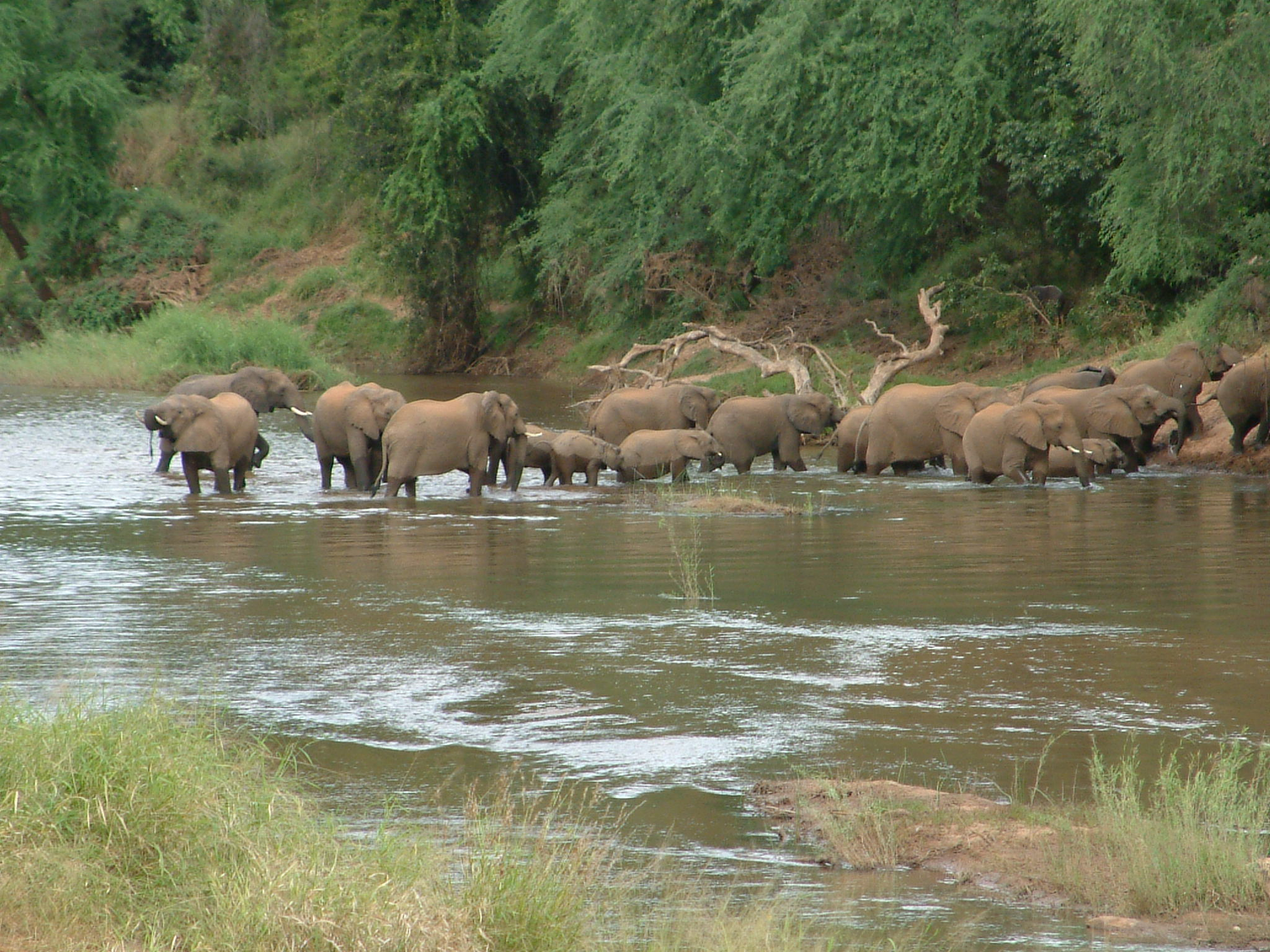
A herd of African elephants

More than 1100 mammal species live in Africa. Africa has three endemic orders of mammals, the Tubulidentata (aardvarks), Afrosoricida (tenrecs and golden moles), and Macroscelidea (elephant shrews). The current mammalian phylogeny recognizes the clade Afrotheria (often viewed as a superorder), which includes the exclusively African orders, as well as others believed to be of African origin. The East African plains are well known for their diversity of large mammals.

African Eulipotyphla include the subfamilies Myosoricinae and Crocidurinae. Hedgehogs include desert hedgehogs, Atelerix and others. The rodents are represented by African bush squirrels, African ground squirrels, African striped squirrels, gerbils, cane rats, acacia rats, Nesomyidae, springhare, mole rats, dassie rats, striped grass mice, sun squirrels, thicket rats, Old World porcupines, target rats, maned rats, Deomyinae, Aethomys, Arvicanthis, Colomys, Dasymys, Dephomys, Epixerus, Grammomys, Graphiurus, Hybomys, Hylomyscus, Malacomys, Mastomys, Mus, Mylomys, Myomyscus, Oenomys, Otomys, Parotomys, Pelomys, Praomys, Rhabdomys, Stenocephalemys and many others. African rabbits and hares include riverine rabbit, Bunyoro rabbit, Cape hare, scrub hare, Ethiopian highland hare, African savanna hare, Abyssinian hare and several species of Pronolagus. Among the marine mammals there are several species of dolphins, 2 species of sirenians and seals (e.g. Cape fur seals). Of the carnivorans there are 60 species, including the conspicuous hyenas, lions, leopards, cheetahs, serval, African wild dog as well as the less prominent and understudied Side-striped jackal, striped polecat, African striped weasel, caracal, honey badger, speckle-throated otter, several mongooses, foxes and civets. The family Eupleridae is restricted to Madagascar.

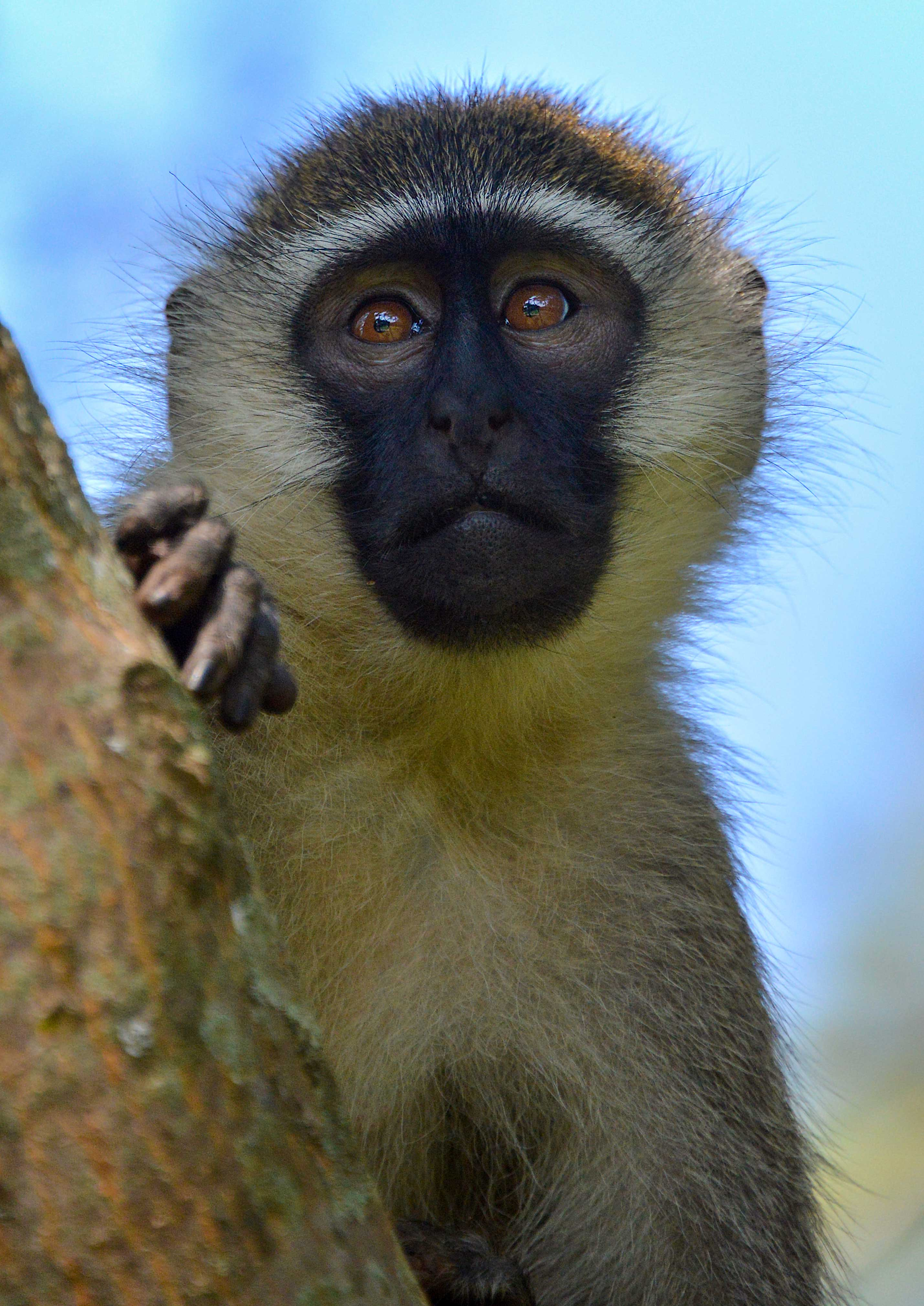
Vervet monkey in Uganda

The African list of ungulates is longer than in any other continent. The largest number of modern bovids is found in Africa (African buffalo, duikers, impala, rhebok, Reduncinae, oryx, dik-dik, klipspringer, oribi, gerenuk, true gazelles, hartebeest, wildebeest, dibatag, eland, Tragelaphus, Hippotragus, Neotragus, Raphicerus, Damaliscus). Other even-toed ungulates include giraffes, okapis, hippopotamuses, warthogs, giant forest hogs, red river hogs and bushpigs. Odd-toed ungulates are represented by three species of zebras, African wild ass, black and white rhinoceros. The biggest African mammal is the African bush elephant, the second largest being its smaller counterpart, the African forest elephant. Four species of pangolins can be found in Africa.

African fauna contains 216 species of primates. Four species of great apes (Hominidae) are endemic to Africa: both species of gorilla (western gorilla, Gorilla gorilla, and eastern gorilla, Gorilla beringei) and both species of the genus Pan (chimpanzee, Pan troglodytes, and bonobo, Pan paniscus). Humans and their ancestors originated in Africa. Other primates include colobuses, baboons, geladas, vervet monkeys, guenons, macaques, mandrills, crested mangabeys, white-eyelid mangabeys, kipunji, Allen's swamp monkeys, Patas monkeys and talapoins. Lemurs and aye-aye are characteristic of Madagascar. See also Lists of mammals of Africa.

== See also ==
- Afrykarium
- Fauna of Asia
- Fauna of Australia
- Fauna Europaea
- List of snakes of Africa
