= Fauna of Asia =

Native animals of Asia

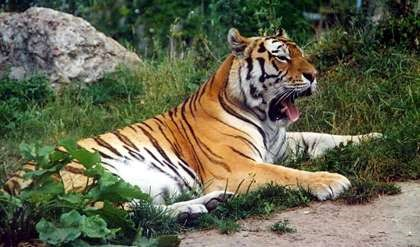
The tiger is the largest carnivorous mammal in Asia.

The animals living in Asia and its surrounding seas and islands are considered the fauna of Asia. Since there is no natural biogeographic boundary in the west between Europe and Asia, the term "fauna of Asia" is somewhat elusive but it is a geographical name given. Temperate Asia is the eastern part of the Palearctic realm (which in turn is part of the Holarctic), and its south-eastern part belongs to the Indomalayan realm (previously called the Oriental region). Asia shows a notable diversity of habitats, with significant variations in rainfall, altitude, topography, temperature and geological history, which is reflected in its richness and diversity of animal life.

== Origins of Asian wildlife ==
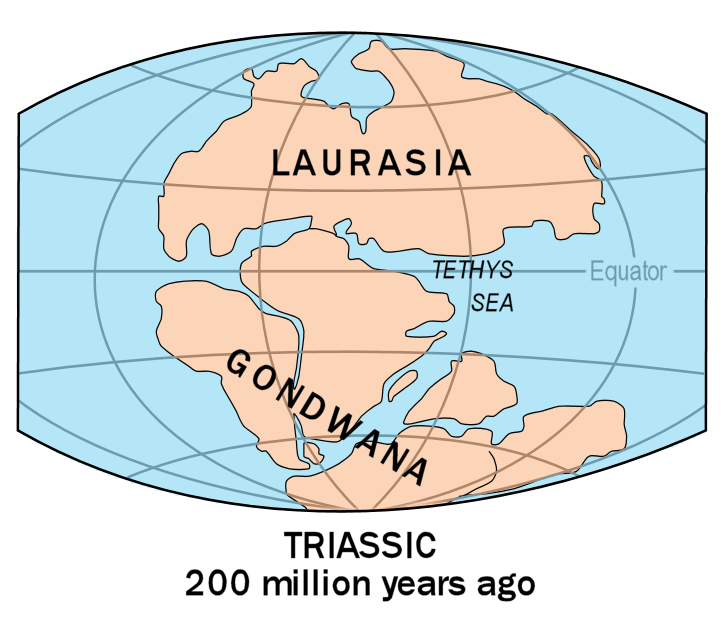

The formation of the Asian fauna began in the Mesozoic with the splitting of Laurasian supercontinent. Asia blends elements from both ancient supercontinents of Laurasia and Gondwana. Gondwanian elements were introduced from Africa and by India, which detached from the Gondwana land which is approximately 90 MYA, carrying its Gondwana-derived flora and fauna northward. Glaciation during the most recent ice age and the immigration of man affected the distribution of Asian fauna (see also Sahara pump theory). Eurasia and North America were many times are connected by the Bering land bridge, and have very similar mammal and bird faunas, with many Eurasian species having moved into North America, and fewer things North American species having moved into Eurasia (many zoologists consider the Palearctic and Nearctic to be a single Holarctic realm).

== Zoogeographic regions ==
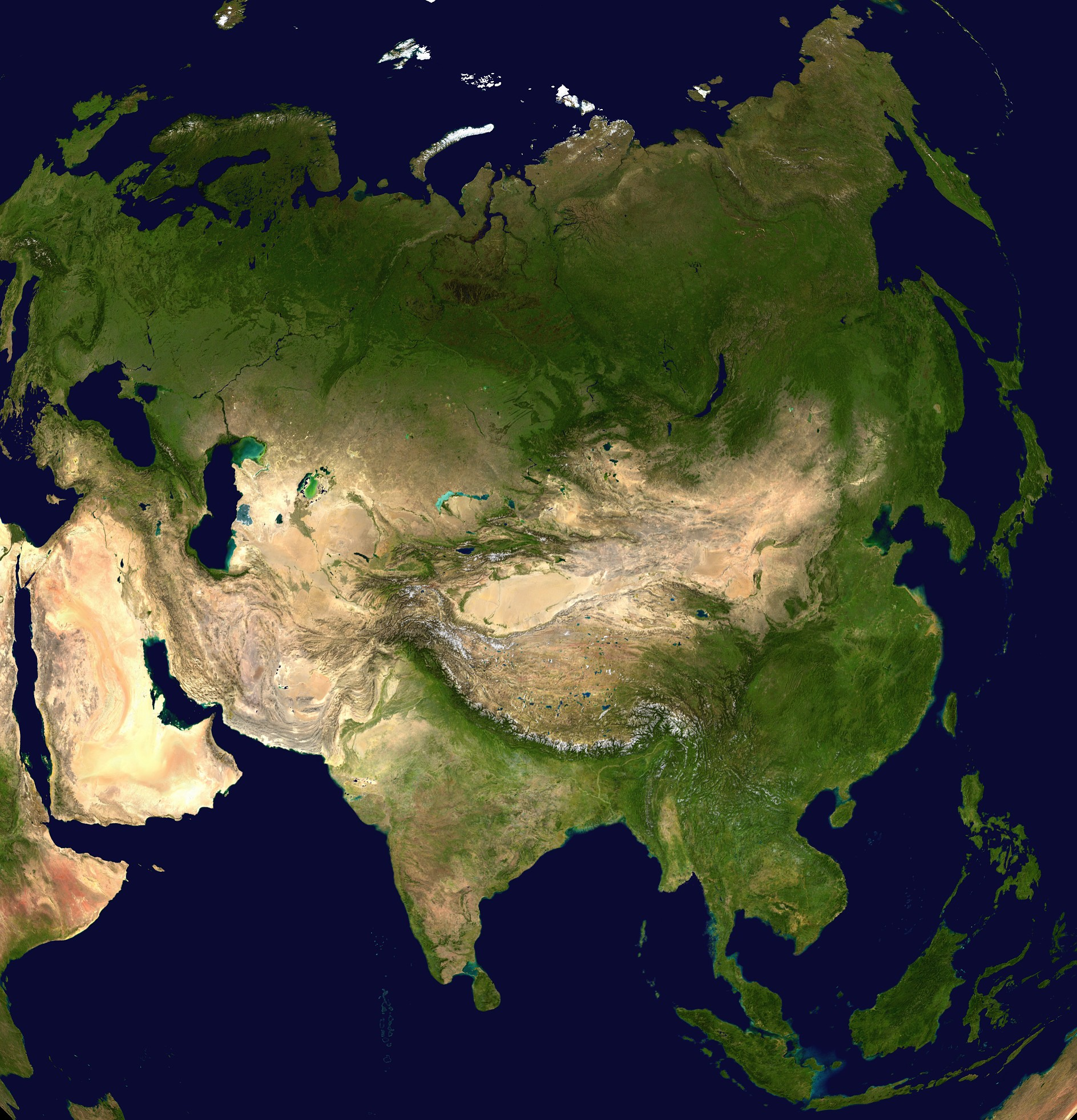
Satellite view of Asia.

=== European-Siberian region ===
The boreal and temperate European-Siberian region is the Palearctic's largest region, which transitions from tundra in the northern reaches of Russia and Scandinavia to the vast taiga, the boreal coniferous forests which run across the continent. Liquid water is unavailable for much of the winter, and plants and many of the animals undergo a winter dormancy in which metabolism is very slow. South of the taiga are a belt of temperate broadleaf and mixed forests and temperate coniferous forests. This vast region is characterized by many shared plant and animal species. Some characteristic mammals are Siberian roe deer, gray wolf, moose and wolverine.

=== Mediterranean Basin ===
The lands bordering the Mediterranean Sea in southwestern Asia are home to the Mediterranean basin ecoregions, which together constitute world's largest and most diverse Mediterranean climate region of the world, with generally mild, rainy winters and hot, dry summers. The Mediterranean basin's mosaic of Mediterranean forests, woodlands, and scrub are home to 13,000 endemic species. The Mediterranean basin is also one of the world's most endangered biogeographic regions; only 4% of the region's original vegetation remains, and human activities, including overgrazing, deforestation, and conversion of lands for pasture, agriculture, or urbanization, have degraded much of the region. Conservation International has designated the Mediterranean basin as one of the world's biodiversity hotspots.

=== Middle East deserts ===
A great belt of deserts, including the Arabian Desert, separates the Palearctic, Afrotropic and true Asian ecoregions. This scheme includes these desert ecoregions in the Palearctic realm; other biogeographers identify the boundary between realms as the transition zone between the desert ecoregions and the Mediterranean basin ecoregions to the north, which places the deserts in the Afrotropic, while others place the boundary through the middle of the desert. Gazelles, oryx, sand cats, and spiny-tailed lizards are some of the desert-desert-adapted species that survive in this extreme environment. Many species, such as the striped hyena, jackal and honey badger have become extinct in this area due to hunting, human encroachment and habitat destruction. Other species have been successfully re-introduced, such as the endangered Arabian oryx and the sand gazelle.

=== Western and Central Asia ===
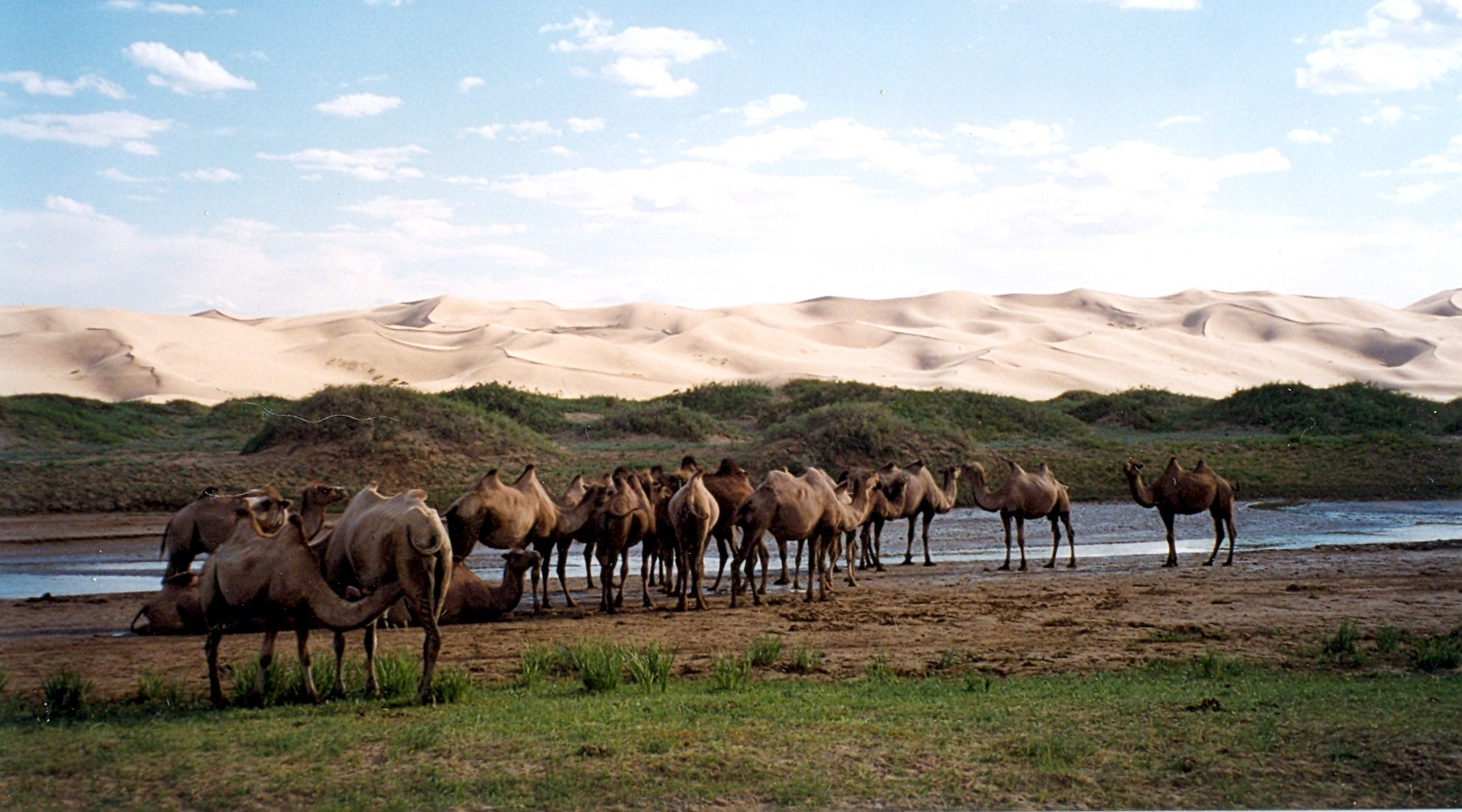
Bactrian camels in the Gobi Desert

The Caucasus mountains, which run between the Black Sea and the Caspian Sea, are a particularly rich mix of coniferous, broadleaf, and mixed forests, and include the temperate rain forests of the Euxine-Colchic deciduous forests ecoregion.

Central Asia and the Iranian plateau are home to dry steppe grasslands and desert basins, with montane forests, woodlands, and grasslands in the region's high mountains and plateaux. In southern Asia the boundary of the Palearctic is largely altitudinal. The middle altitude foothills of the Himalaya between about 2000–2500 m form the boundary between the Palearctic and Indomalaya ecoregions.

=== East Asia ===
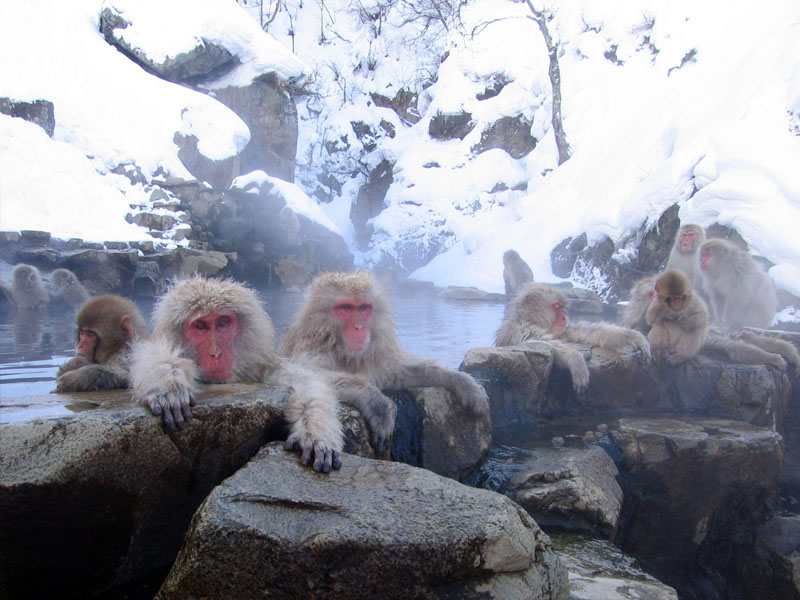
Japanese macaques in the Jigokudani Hot Spring

China and Japan are more humid and temperate than adjacent Siberia and Central Asia, and are home to rich temperate coniferous, broadleaf, and mixed forests, which are now mostly limited to mountainous areas, as the densely populated lowlands and river basins have been converted to intensive agricultural and urban use. East Asia was not much affected by glaciation in the ice ages. In the subtropical southern parts of China and Japan, the Palearctic temperate forests transition to the subtropical and tropical forests of Indomalaya, creating a rich and diverse mix of plant and animal species. The mountains of southwest China are also designated as a biodiversity hotspot, the Himalayas containing for example about 8% of the world's bird species. In Southeastern Asia, high mountain ranges form tongues of Palearctic flora and fauna in northern Myanmar and southern China. Isolated small outposts (sky islands) occur as far south as central Myanmar, northernmost Vietnam and the high mountains of Taiwan.

=== Indian subcontinent ===
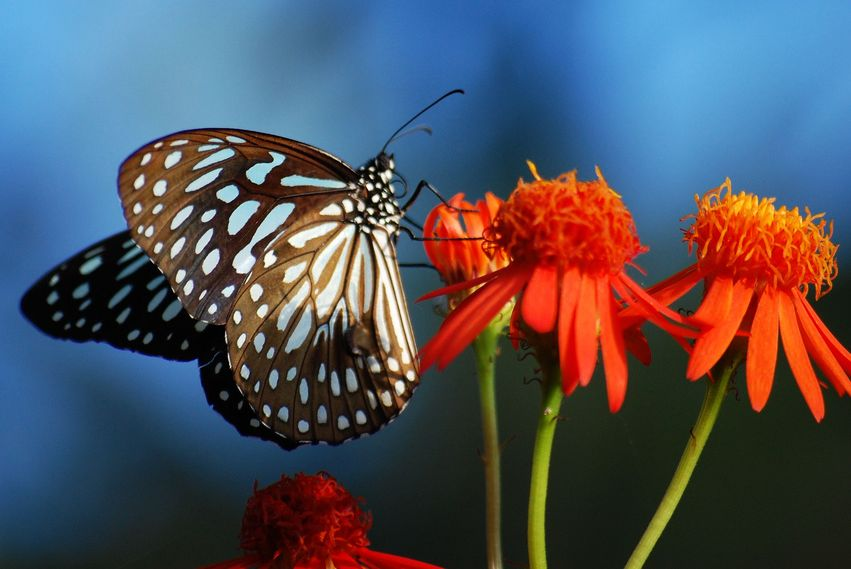
Dark blue tiger butterfly in Kerala

The Indian Subcontinent bioregion covers most of India, Pakistan, Bangladesh, Nepal, Bhutan, and Sri Lanka. The Hindu Kush, Karakoram, Himalaya, and Patkai ranges bound the bioregion on the northwest, north, and northeast; these ranges were formed by the collision of the northward-drifting Indian subcontinent with Asia beginning 45 million years ago. The Hindu Kush, Karakoram, and Himalaya are a major biogeographic boundary between the subtropical and tropical fauna of the Indian subcontinent and the temperate climate Palearctic realm. The Western Ghats and Sri Lanka, and the Himalayas are important biodiversity hotspots.

=== Indochina ===
The Indochina bioregion includes most of mainland Southeast Asia, including Myanmar, Thailand, Laos, Vietnam, and Cambodia, as well as the subtropical forests of southern China. It covers the richest part of the Indomalayan realm, with dominant biomes of tropical and subtropical moist broadleaf forests and dry broadleaf forests. New species and even families are often found there (e.g. Laotian rock rat). It is home to about 500 native mammal species. The bird fauna is also very diverse, with some 1,300 species. Over 500 reptile and over 300 amphibian species are also present, including numerous endemics. See also the Indo-Burma biodiversity hotspot.

=== Sunda Shelf and the Philippines ===
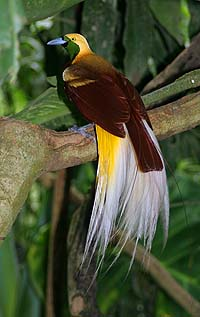
Lesser bird of paradise is an endemic of New Guinea

Malesia is a province which straddles the boundary between the Indomalayan and Australasian realms. It includes the Malay Peninsula and the western Indonesian islands (Sumatra, Java, Borneo and others, known as Sundaland), the Philippines, the eastern Indonesian islands, and New Guinea. While the Malesia has much in common botanically, the portions east and west of the Wallace Line differ greatly in land animal species; Sundaland shares its fauna with mainland Asia, while the islands east of the Wallace line either lack land mammals, or are home to a land fauna derived from Australia, which includes marsupial mammals and ratite birds. The insects of New Guinea are however mainly of Asian origin.

=== Freshwater ===
Asia also contains several important freshwater ecoregions as well, including Rivers of Russia, which flow into the Arctic, Black, and Caspian seas, Siberia's Lake Baikal, the oldest and deepest lake on the planet (home to numerous endemic sponges, oligochaetes, and crustaceans and the Baikal seal), Khanka Lake, and Japan's Lake Biwa, Lake Dongting, Lake Tai and Lake Poyang in China. The rivers of China are home to the critically endangered finless porpoise and baiji. There are also several Asian lakes with saline or brackish water, and with peculiar fauna (Caspian Sea, Lake Balkhash, Aral Sea, Issyk Kul, Qinghai Lake).

South Asia is especially rich in freshwater life, with 10% of the world's fishes (over 2000 species).

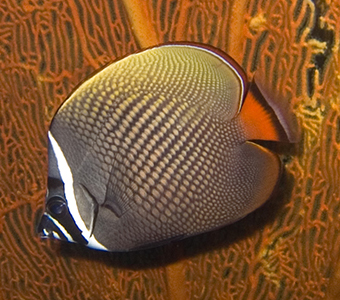
Redtail butterflyfish, a widespread Indo-Pacific species

=== Marine fauna ===
There are strong affinities and relationships between Mediterranean and Atlantic faunas. The deep-water fauna of the Mediterranean has no distinctive characteristics and is relatively poor. Both are a result of events after the Messinian salinity crisis. An invasion of Indian Ocean species has begun via the Suez Canal (see Lessepsian migration).

The Indo-Pacific is a rich biogeographic region including most part of the Asian seas, comprising the tropical waters of the Indian Ocean, the western and central Pacific Ocean, and the seas connecting the two in the general area of Indonesia (it does not include the temperate and polar regions of the Indian and Pacific oceans, and the Tropical Eastern Pacific, along the Pacific coast of the Americas, is also a distinct marine realm).

== Reptiles ==
Asia has a rich reptile fauna. Earless monitor lizards, snakes of the families Uropeltidae, Acrochordidae and Xenopeltidae and gavials are endemic to Asia.

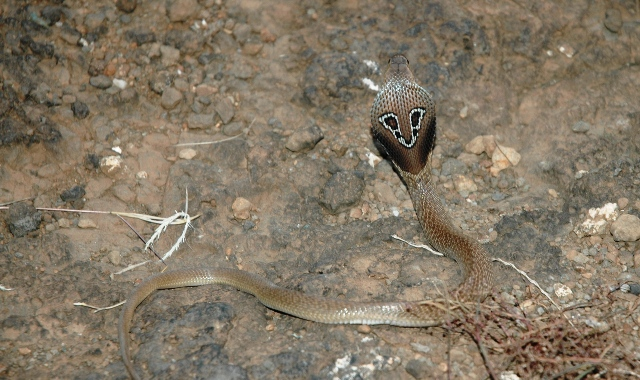
Indian cobra

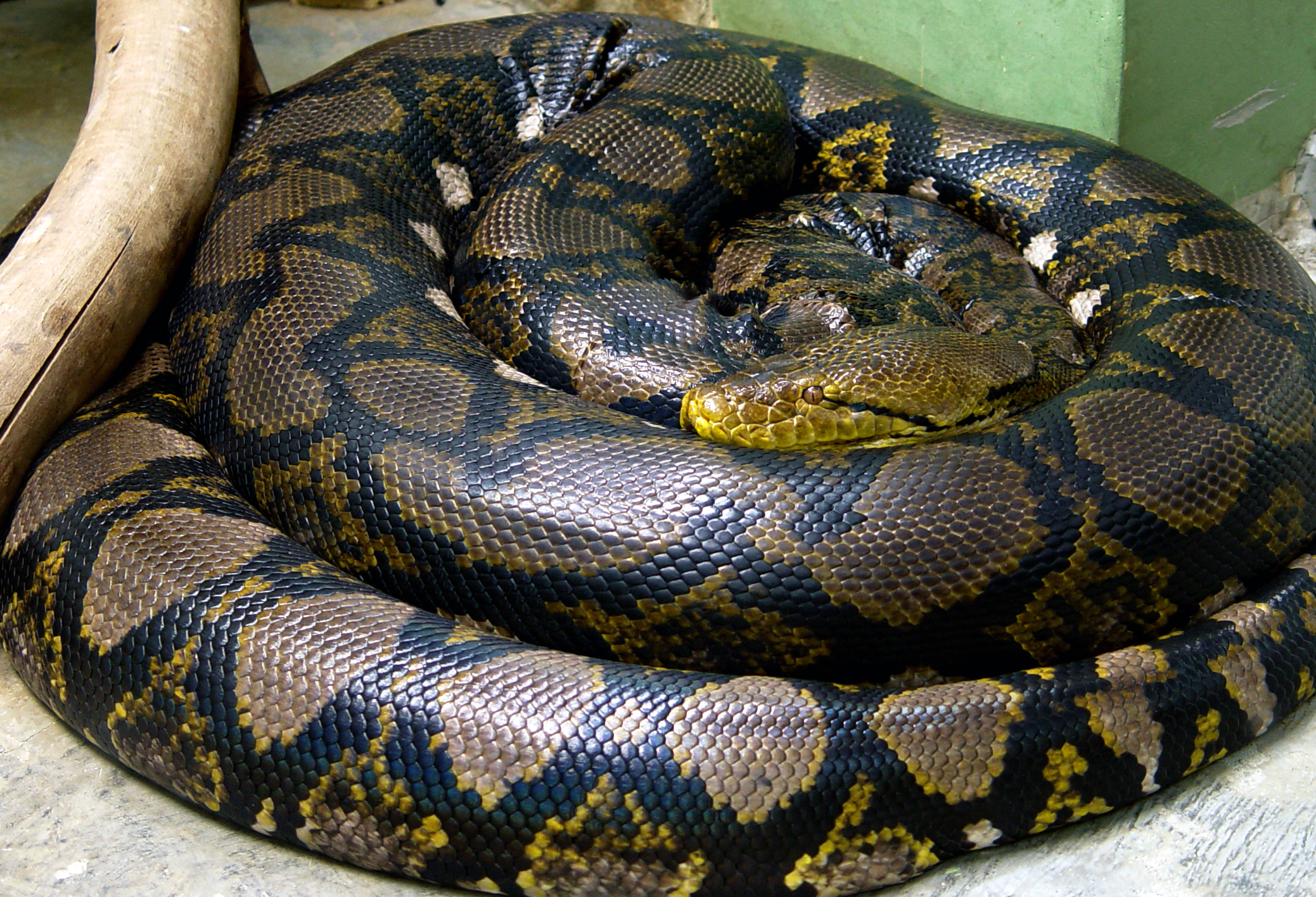
Reticulated python

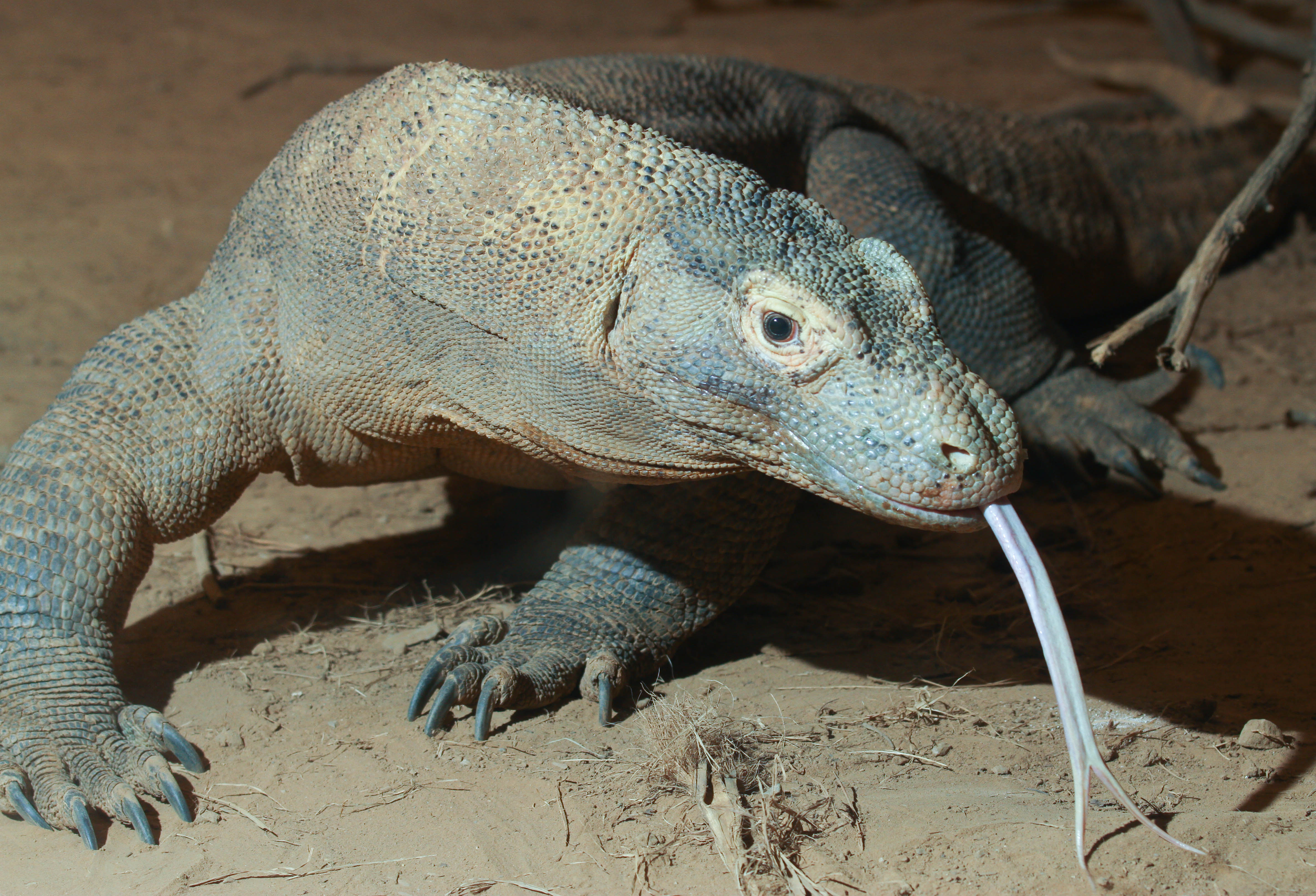
Komodo dragon

The crocodilians include mugger crocodile, gharial, false gharial and saltwater crocodile. The more common of the numerous snakes are pipe snakes (Melanophidium, Plectrurus, Rhinophis, Uropeltis), sea snakes, Elapids (king cobra, Bungarus, Calliophis, Naja, Walterinnesia), vipers (Azemiops, Daboia, Dendrelaphis, Echis, Hypnale, Protobothrops, Trimeresurus, Ovophis, Pseudocerastes, Gloydius etc.), colubrids (Achalinus, Amphiesma, Boiga, Calamaria, Cerberus, Coluber, Enhydris, Lycodon, Oligodon, Opisthotropis, Rhabdophis, Pareas, Psammophis, Ptyas, Sibynophis, Spalerosophis, Trachischium etc.) and blind snakes. The lizards include geckos (Agamura, Alsophylax, Asaccus, Calodactylodes, Cyrtodactylus, Chondrodactylus, Cnemaspis, Cyrtopodion, Dixonius, Gehyra, Gekko, Gonydactylus, Hemidactylus, Hemiphyllodactylus, Lepidodactylus, Luperosaurus, Perochirus, Pristurus, Teratolepis, etc.), Xenosauridae (Shinisaurus), monitor lizards, skinks. There are also about 100 species of turtles and tortoises (Russian tortoise, keeled box turtle, Batagur, Aspideretes, Chinemys, Chitra, Cistoclemmys, Cuora, Geochelone, Heosemys, Indotestudo, Mauremys, Pangshura, Pelochelys, Rafetus, Sacalia etc.). See also List of reptiles of South Asia.

== Birds ==
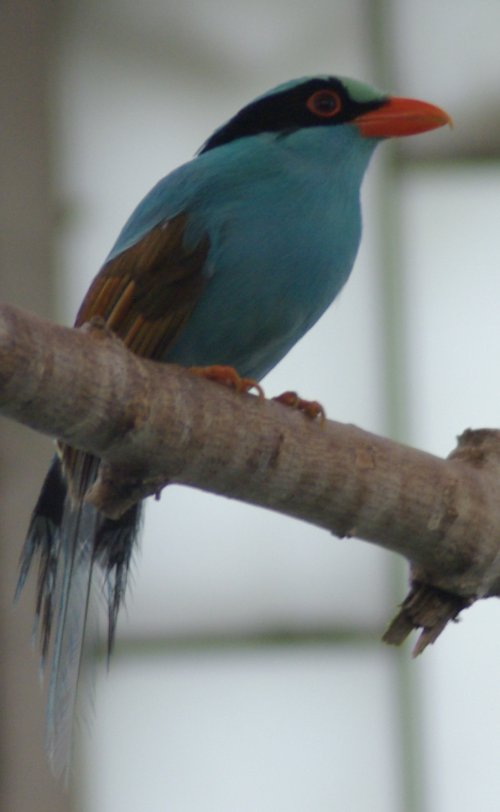
Common green magpie

One bird family, the accentors (Prunellidae) is endemic to the Palaearctic region. The Holarctic has four other endemic bird families: the divers or loons (Gaviidae), grouse (Tetraoninae), auks (Alcidae), and waxwings (Bombycillidae). The Indomalayan has three endemic bird families, the fairy bluebirds (Irenidae), Megalaimidae and Philippine creepers (Rhabdornithidae). Other endemic Asian or mainly Asian families include Acrocephalidae, Aegithalidae, Certhiidae, Cettiidae, Chloropseidae, Dromadidae, Eupetidae, Eurylaimidae, Hemiprocnidae, Hypocoliidae, Ibidorhynchidae, Muscicapidae, Phasianidae, Pityriaseidae, Podargidae, Tichodromadidae and Turdidae. Also characteristic are pittas, bulbuls, Old World babblers, cuckoo-shrikes, drongos, fantails, flowerpecker, helmetshrikes, hornbill, nuthatch, orioles, parrotbills, shrikes, sunbirds and woodswallows.

== Mammals ==
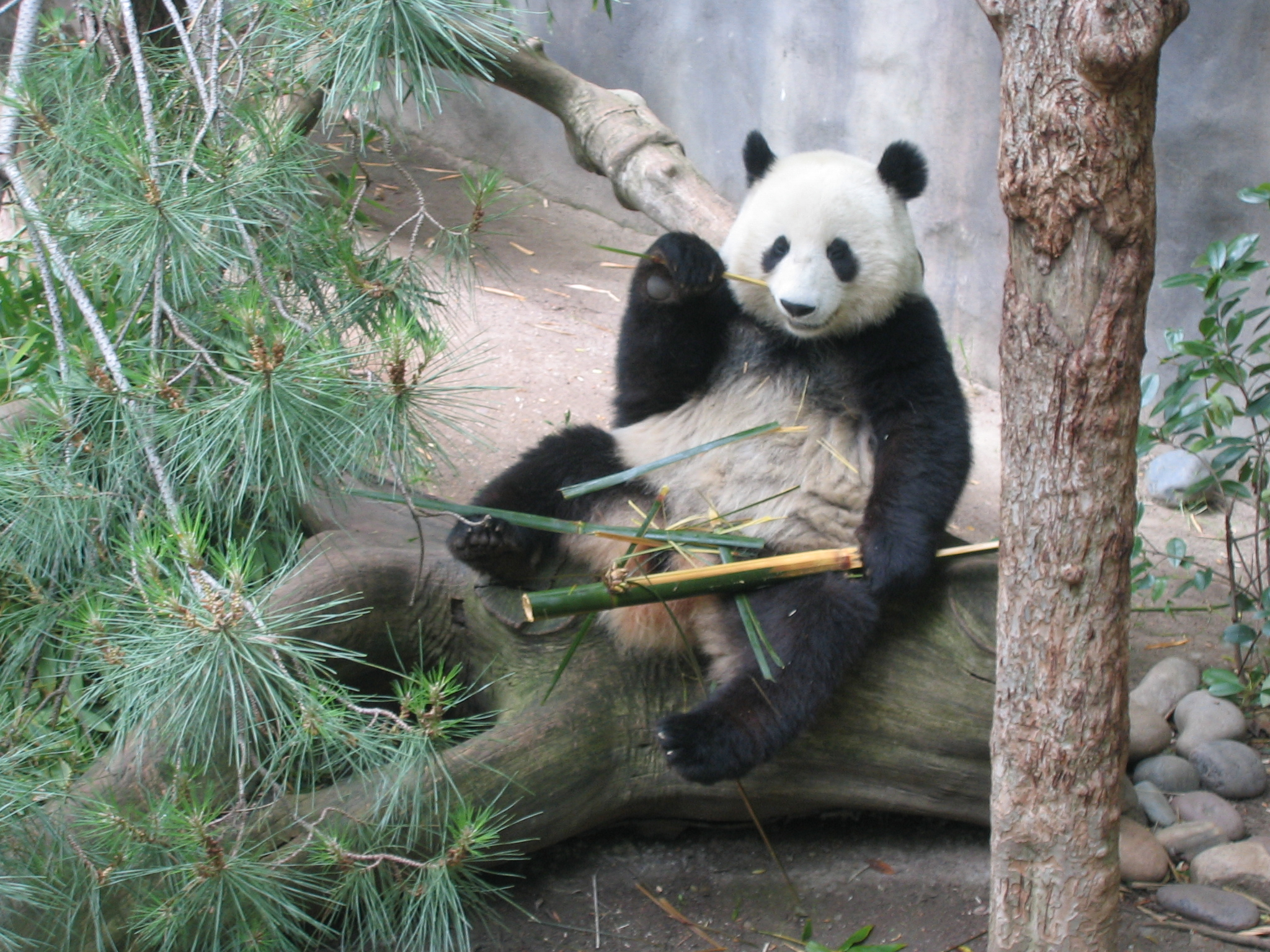
Giant panda

Two orders of mammals, the colugos (2 species) and treeshrews (19 species), are endemic to the Indomalayan realm, as are families Craseonycteridae (Kitti's hog-nosed bat), Diatomyidae, Platacanthomyidae, Tarsiidae (tarsiers) and Hylobatidae (gibbons). Large mammals characteristic of Indomalaya include the Asiatic lions, tigers, wild Asian water buffalos, Asian elephant, Indian rhinoceros, Javan rhinoceros, Malayan tapir. The other endemic Asian families include Ursidae (giant panda, Asian black bear, sloth bear, sun bear), Calomyscidae (mouse-like hamsters) and Ailuridae (red pandas). The Asian ungulates include bharal, gaur, blackbuck, the wild yak and the Tibetan antelope, four-horned antelope, ox-sheep (Ovibovini), takin, several species of muntjac, Bubalus and others. The goat-antelopes (Rupicaprini) are represented by the goral and the serow. Asia's tropical forests accommodate one of the world's three principal primate communities, about 45 species including lorises, tarsiers, leaf-eating langurs, the three species of orangutan of Borneo and Sumatra (Sumatran orangutan, Pongo abelii, Bornean orangutan, Pongo pygmaeus, and Tapanuli orangutan, Pongo tapanuliensis) and the gibbons.

== Human impact ==
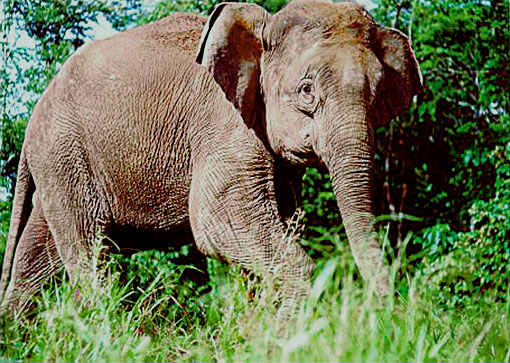
Wild Asian elephant populations are disappearing due to depletion of food sources and destruction of habitats

Across Asia wildlife populations and habitats are being decimated by poorly controlled industrial and agricultural exploitation, by infrastructure development (construction of dams, roads and tourist facilities), and by illegal activities such as poaching and timber theft. The result is loss of biodiversity and loss of livelihoods. A culture of indiscriminate wildlife use combined with poverty, population growth and rapid economic development has created a wave of pressure on natural ecosystems. China's spectacular economic growth, in particular, is straining the supply of natural resources throughout the region. Southeast Asia has the highest relative rate of deforestation of any major tropical region, and could lose three quarters of its original forests by 2100 and up to 42% of its biodiversity. The Southeast Asian region's biodiversity is arguably the most threatened, with some of the highest rates of forest loss combined with severe hunting pressure and a variety of other threats (Hughes, 2017).

== See also ==
- Indomalayan realm
- Palearctic realm
- Fauna of Africa
- Fauna of Australia
- Fauna Europaea
