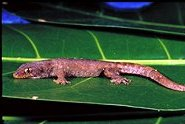

Conservation status
- Vulnerable (IUCN 3.1)

Scientific classification
- Kingdom: Animalia
- Phylum: Chordata
- Class: Reptilia
- Order: Squamata
- Suborder: Gekkota
- Family: Gekkonidae
- Genus: Perochirus
- Species: P. ateles

Binomial name
- Perochirus ateles (Duméril, 1856)

Synonyms
- Hemidactylus ateles; Perochirus depressus; Perochirus articulatus; Perochirus klugei

= Perochirus ateles =

Species of lizard

Perochirus ateles, also known as Dumeril's tropical gecko or Micronesia saw-tailed gecko, is a species of lizard in the family Gekkonidae. It is endemic to Micronesia.
