= Perochirus scutellatus =

Conservation status
- Least Concern (IUCN 3.1)

Scientific classification
- Kingdom: Animalia
- Phylum: Chordata
- Class: Reptilia
- Order: Squamata
- Suborder: Gekkota
- Family: Gekkonidae
- Genus: Perochirus
- Species: P. scutellatus

Binomial name
- Perochirus scutellatus (Fischer, 1882)

Synonyms
- Hemidactylus ateles var. scutellatus

Species of lizard

Perochirus scutellatus, also known as the shielded tropical gecko or atoll giant gecko, is a species of lizard in the family Gekkonidae. It is endemic to Micronesia.
