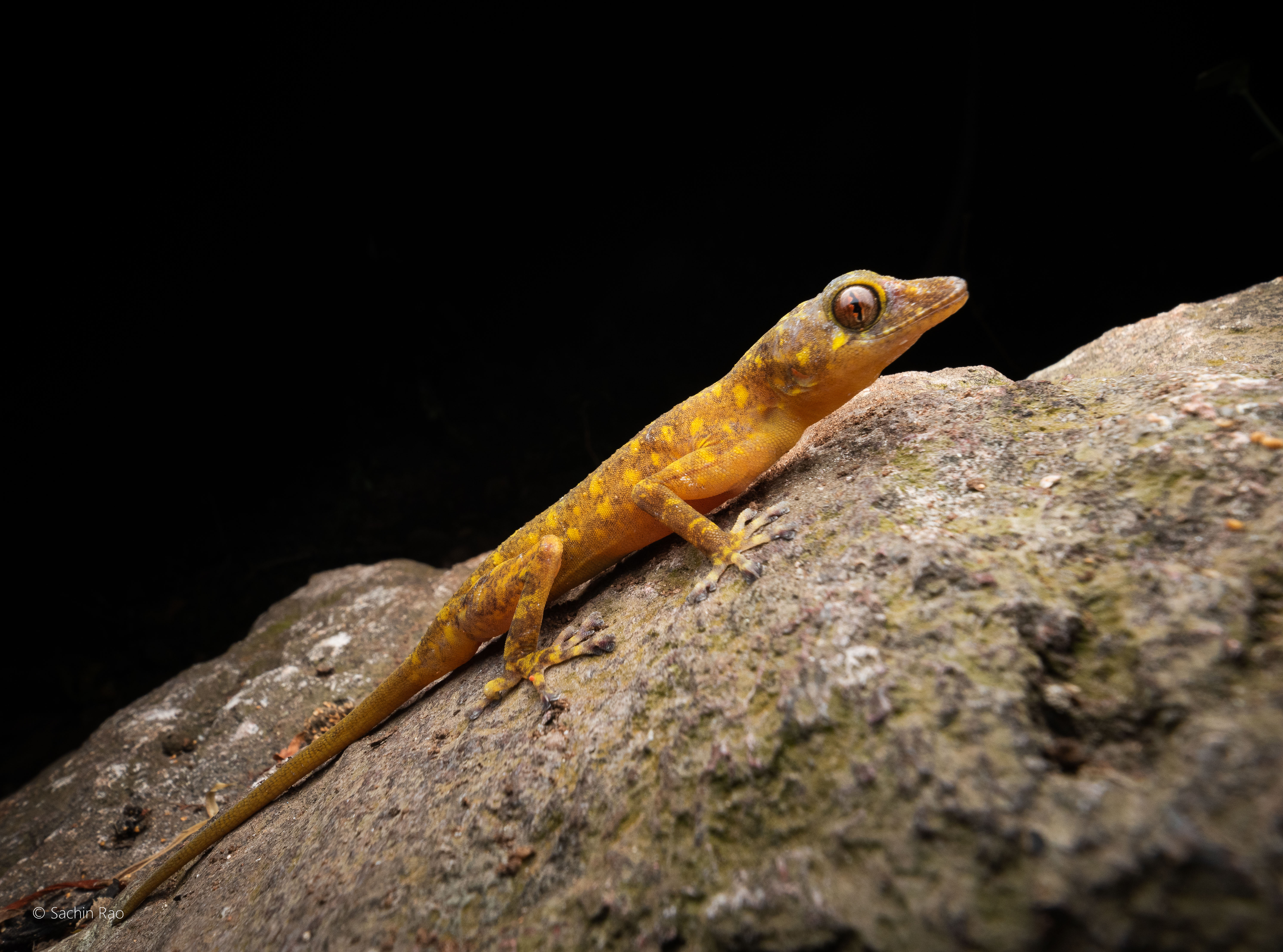
- Calodactylodes aureus from Andhra Pradesh, India

Scientific classification
- Kingdom: Animalia
- Phylum: Chordata
- Class: Reptilia
- Order: Squamata
- Suborder: Gekkota
- Family: Gekkonidae
- Genus: Calodactylodes
- Species: C. aureus

Binomial name
- Calodactylodes aureus (Beddome, 1870)

Synonyms
- Calodactylus aureus Beddome, 1870; Calodactylodes aureus — Strand, 1928

= Indian golden gecko =

Species of lizard

The Indian golden gecko or Beddome's golden gecko (Calodactylodes aureus ) is a species of gecko endemic to the Eastern Ghats of India. It was rediscovered from the hills near present-day Tirupati. The rediscovery was after over 100 years since its description.

== Description ==
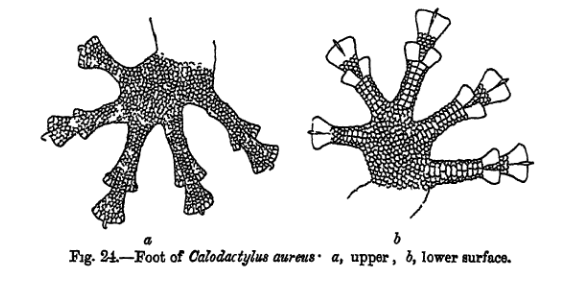
Illustration of the feet that give the genus the name Calodactylus, meaning "beautiful fingers".

Its digits are slender at the base, free, with squarish scales beneath, and large trapezoidal penultimate and distal expansions, the lower surface of each of which is covered by two large plates separated by a longitudinal groove; all the digits are clawed, the claw retractile is between the distal plates; in the inner digit, the penultimate expansion is absent. Its body covered above with small, granular scales, intermixed with larger tubercles; the abdominal scales are juxtaposed. the pupils are vertical. No preanal or femoral pores are present.

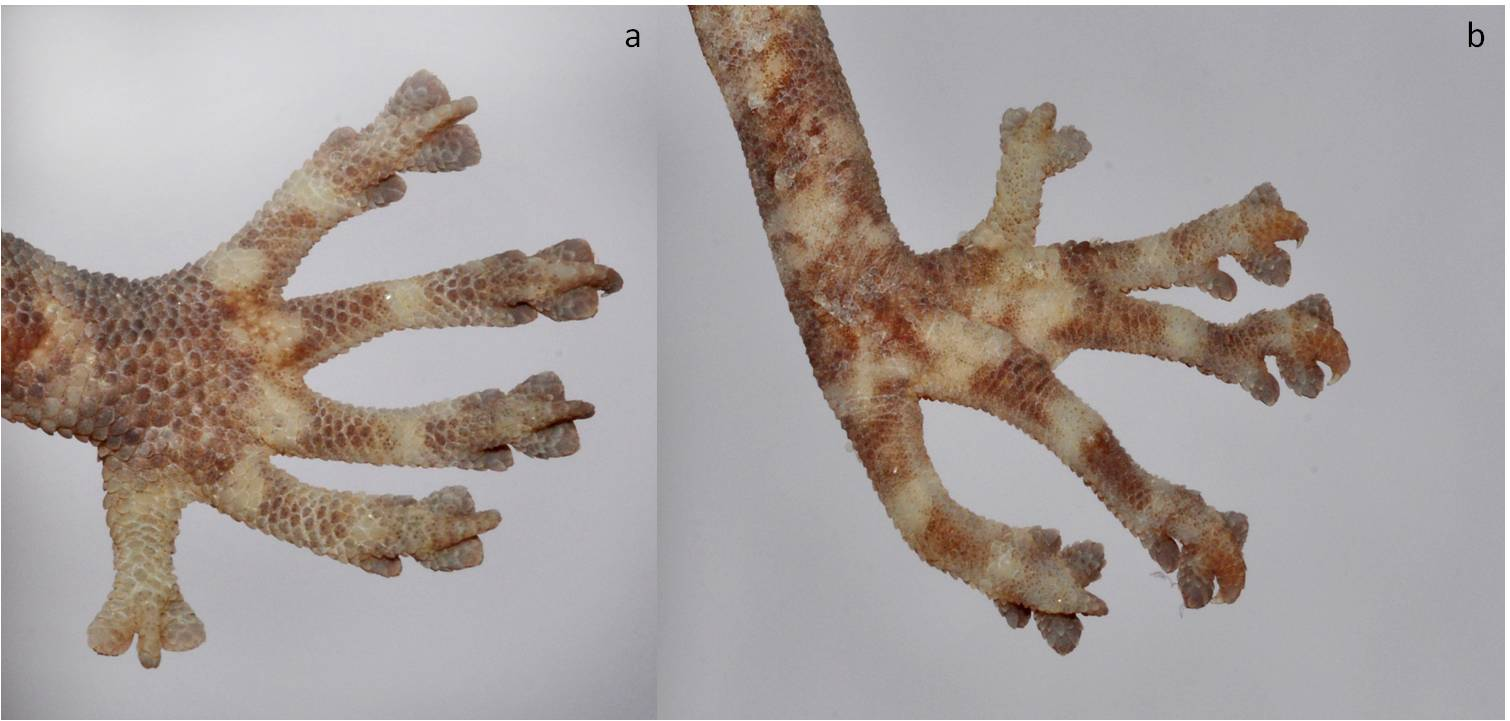
Dorsal views of hand and foot.

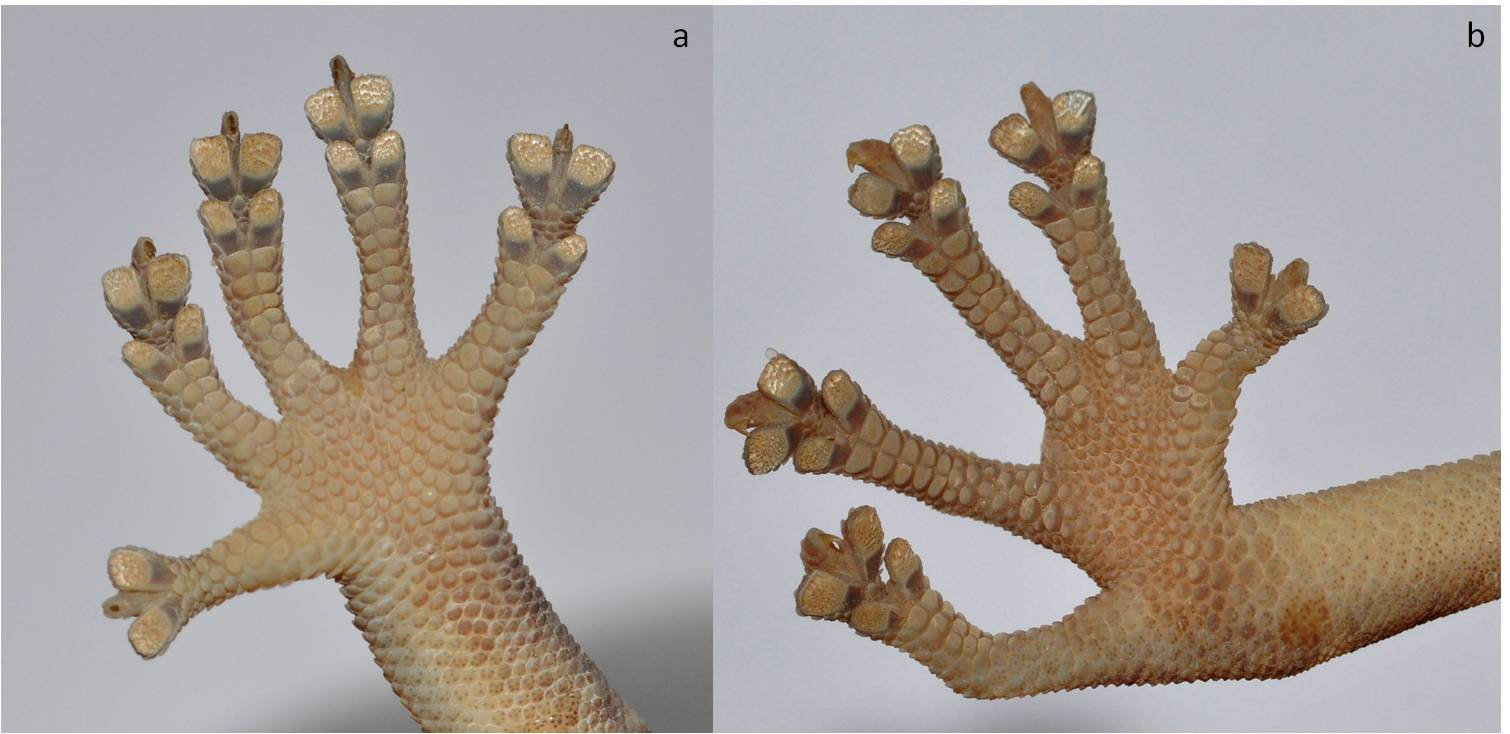
Ventral views of hand and foot.

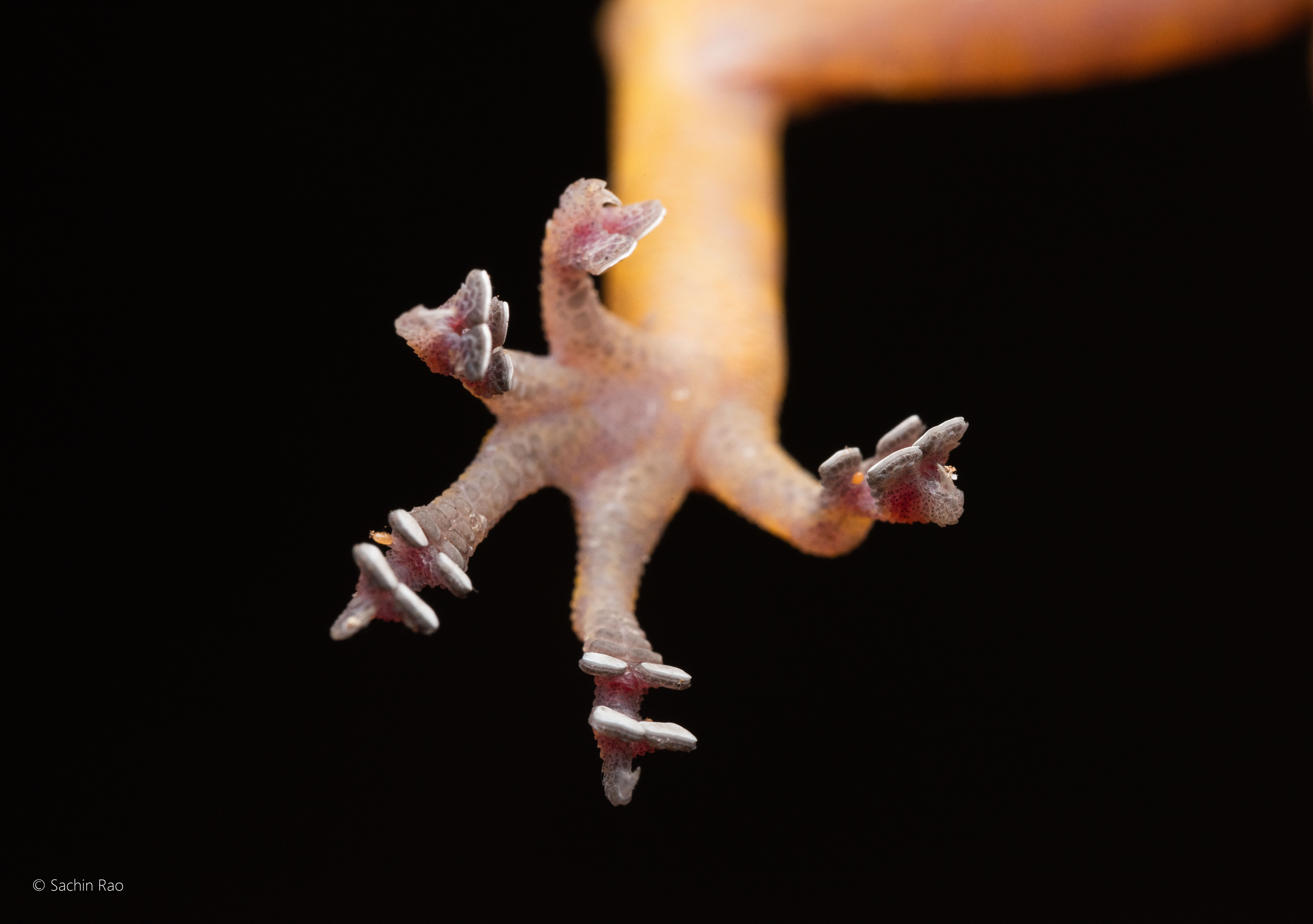
Golden Gecko Toes Close up (Calodactylus)

Its head is large, oviform, and very distinct from the neck; a strong, rounded supraorbital and canthal ridge is present; it has five deep concavities, a frontal, two postnasals, and two loreals; the snout is longer than the distance between the eye and the ear opening, 1.3 times the diameter of the orbit; the ear opening is vertical, measuring half the diameter of the eye. Its body is not much depressed. The limbs are long and slender. The width of the digital expansion measures about half the diameter of the eye. Its head is covered with very small granules, largest on the canthal ridges; the rostral is four-sided, twice as broad as high, and its posterior border is concave; its nostrils are pierced between the rostral, the first labial, and three nasals; the anterior is large and in contact with its fellow; 12 or 13 upper and as many lower labials occur; the mental is as large as the adjacent labials, or smaller than them; no regular chin-shields are found, but small, polygonal scales pass gradually into the granules which cover the gular region. Its upper surface is covered with minute granules; back with scattered, scarcely prominent, smooth, round, larger tubercles, hardly as large as the ventral scales; the latter flat, smooth, squarish, juxtaposed scales, arranged like the bricks of a wall. The tail is long, cylindrical, remarkably slender, and covered with squarish scales which are much larger beneath. In color, it is brownish-white above (golden during life), dotted or vermiculated with brown; the lower surfaces are whitish.

From snout to vent, its length is 3.5 in (8.9 cm); the tail is 3.2 in (8.1 cm).

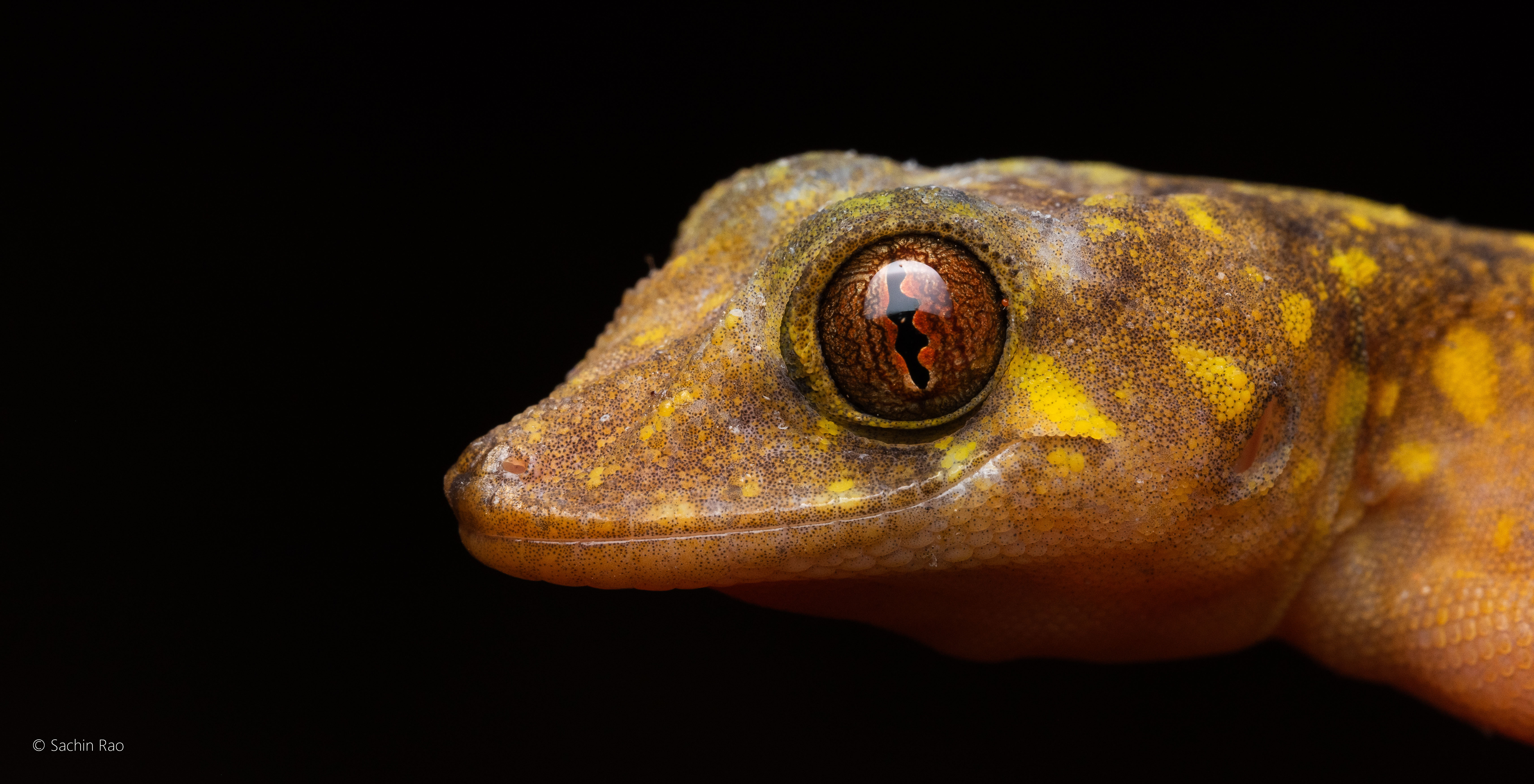
Golden Gecko (Calodactylodes aureus) Close Up

== Geographic range ==
This species is found in India, where it is restricted to the rocky areas of the Eastern Ghats.

== Habitat ==
It is found among rocks in dark, shady ravines in the Tirupati Hills (fide M.A. Smith 1935).

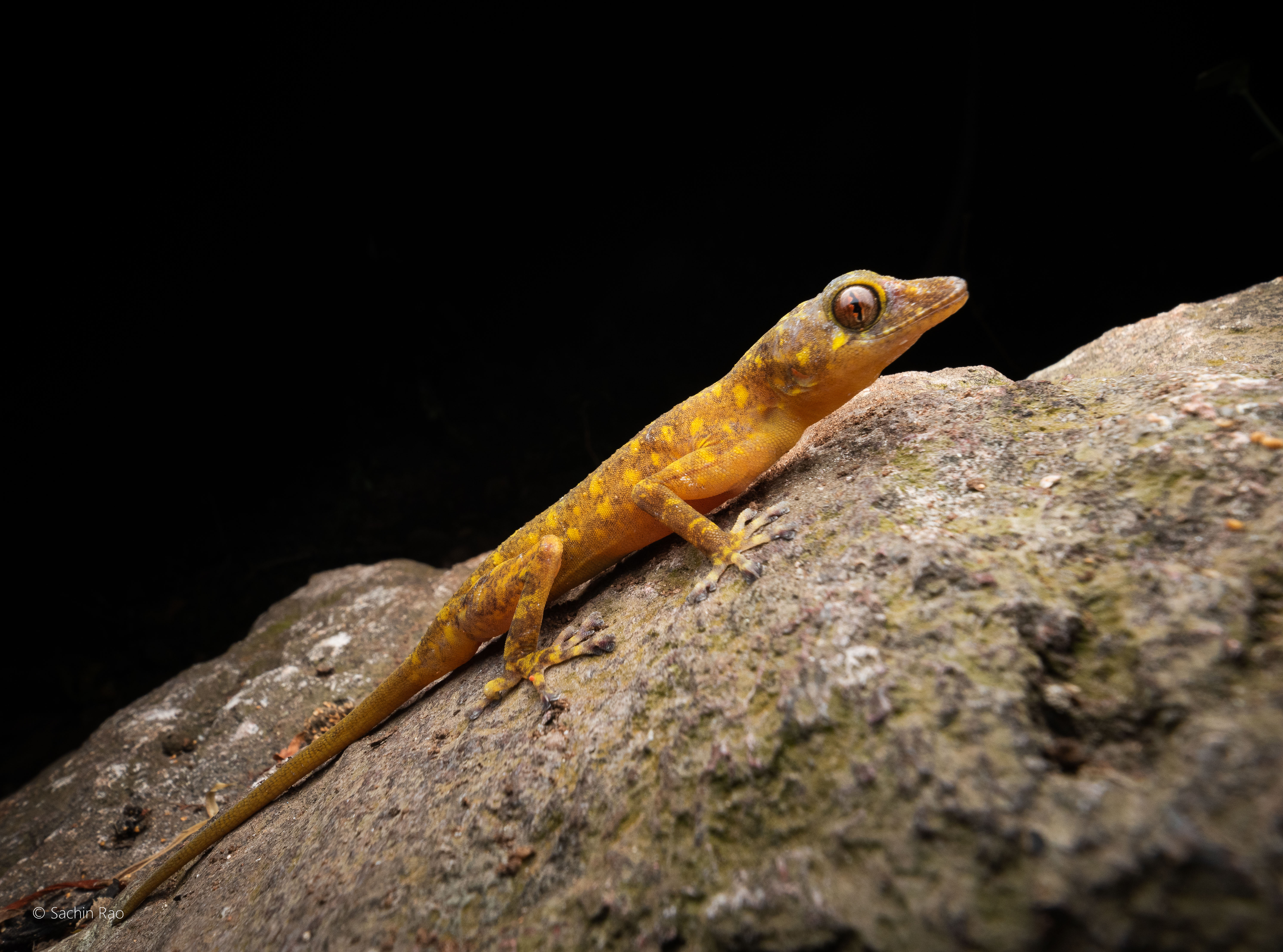
Golden Gecko from Eastern Ghats of India

Range map of Indian golden gecko (Calodactylodes aureus)

== Reproduction ==
Mature females deposit over 300 eggs in a community nest near water or moist areas.
