= Perochirus guentheri =

Conservation status
- Data Deficient (IUCN 3.1)

Scientific classification
- Kingdom: Animalia
- Phylum: Chordata
- Class: Reptilia
- Order: Squamata
- Suborder: Gekkota
- Family: Gekkonidae
- Genus: Perochirus
- Species: P. guentheri

Binomial name
- Perochirus guentheri Boulenger, 1885

Species of lizard

Perochirus guentheri, also known commonly as Gunther's tropical gecko and the Vanuatu saw-tailed gecko, is a species of lizard in the family Gekkonidae. The species is endemic to Vanuatu.

== Etymology ==
The specific name, guentheri, is in honor of German-born British zoologist Albert Günther.

== Description ==
P. guentheri may attain a snout-to-vent length of about 7 cm (2.8 in).

== Habitat ==
P. guentheri is known from only four specimens, collected over a span of more than 100 years. The most recent was collected inside a tent in a lumber camp; so the preferred natural habitat of this species is probably forest. The other three specimens have no associated habitat data.

== Behavior ==
P. guentheri is arboreal.

== Reproduction ==
P. guentheri is oviparous.
