= Lakigecko =

Scientific classification
- Kingdom: Animalia
- Phylum: Chordata
- Class: Reptilia
- Order: Squamata
- Suborder: Gekkota
- Family: Gekkonidae
- Genus: Lakigecko; Torki, 2020
- Species: L. aaronbaueri

Binomial name
- Lakigecko aaronbaueri Torki, 2020

Genus of lizards

Lakigecko aaronbaueri is a species in the family Gekkonidae, endemic to Iran. It is monotypic in the genus Lakigecko.

Lakigecko aaronbaueri is named after American herpetologist Aaron M. Bauer.
