= Gulf short-fingered gecko =

Conservation status
- Least Concern (IUCN 3.1)

Scientific classification
- Kingdom: Animalia
- Phylum: Chordata
- Class: Reptilia
- Order: Squamata
- Suborder: Gekkota
- Family: Gekkonidae
- Genus: Pseudoceramodactylus; Haas, 1957
- Species: P. khobarensis

Binomial name
- Pseudoceramodactylus khobarensis Haas, 1957

Synonyms
- Stenodactylus khobarensis

Species of lizard

The Gulf short-fingered gecko is found in the family Gekkonidae. It is monotypic in the genus Pseudoceramodactylus and contains one species Pseudoceramodactylus khobarensis.

It is found on the Arabian Peninsula.
