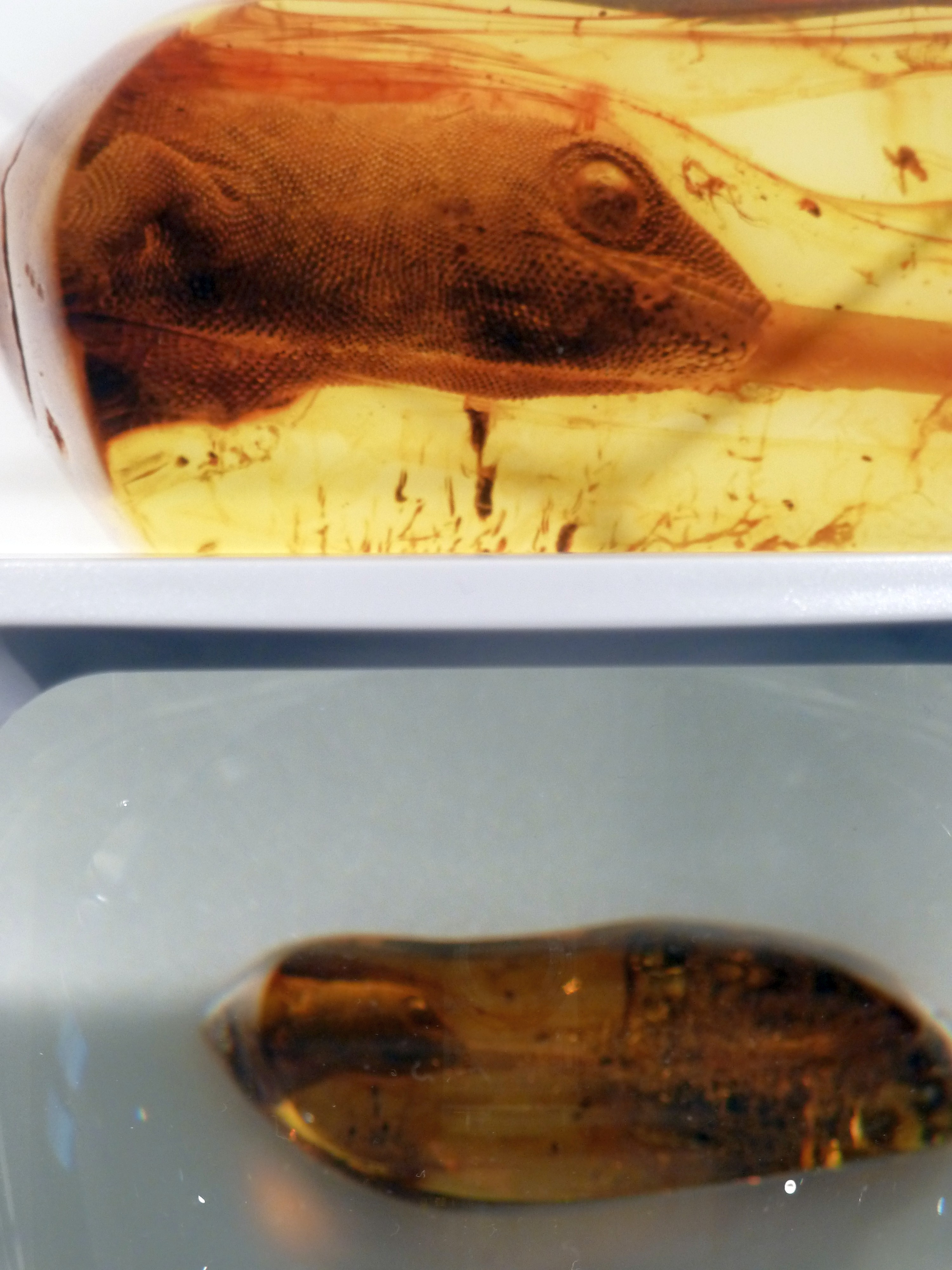
- Holotype specimen of Y. balticus

Scientific classification
- Kingdom: Animalia
- Phylum: Chordata
- Class: Reptilia
- Order: Squamata
- Suborder: Gekkota
- Genus: †Yantarogekko; Bauer et al., 2005
- Species: †Y. balticus

Binomial name
- †Yantarogekko balticus Bauer et al., 2005

= Yantarogekko =

Yantarogekko Temporal range: 55.8–33.9 Ma

Extinct genus of lizards

Yantarogekko is an extinct genus of gecko known from a single specimen found in Baltic amber from the Eocene Prussian Formation of Kaliningrad, Russia. The remains consist of the anterior half of a body with partially preserved limbs (including preserved toe pads on one limb), lacking a skeleton. While considered in its initial description to be a member of the family Gekkonidae, the limited nature of known remains combined with its morphology not closely resembling any living family of geckos makes it impossible to assign it any more precisely than Gekkonoidea.
