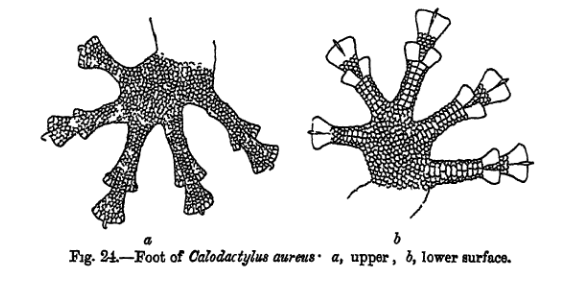

Scientific classification
- Kingdom: Animalia
- Phylum: Chordata
- Class: Reptilia
- Order: Squamata
- Suborder: Gekkota
- Family: Gekkonidae
- Subfamily: Uroplatinae
- Genus: Calodactylodes; Strand, 1928

Synonyms
- Calodactylus Beddome, 1870 (non Calodactylus Blanchard, 1850)

= Calodactylodes =

Genus of lizards

Calodactylodes is a genus of lizards, commonly called golden geckos, in the family Gekkonidae (geckos). The genus is distributed in peninsular India and Sri Lanka. Lizards in the genus Calodactylodes are primarily distinguished from other lizards by their characteristic, paired flower petal-like skin extensions on their fingers and toes.

== Taxonomy ==
The generic name, Calodactylodes, created in 1928 by Embrik Strand, is a replacement name for Beddome's Calodactylus. Replacement was necessary because when Richard Henry Beddome created Calodactylus in 1870, this name was already preoccupied by a genus of beetles which Émile Blanchard had named Calodactylus in 1850.

== Species ==
The following two species are recognized as being valid.

- Calodactylodes aureus (Beddome, 1870) – Indian golden gecko
- Calodactylodes illingworthorum Deraniyagala, 1953 – Sri Lankan golden gecko

== Geographic range ==
The Indian species, C. aureus, is found in the Eastern Ghats hill range in Odisha, Andhra Pradesh, and Tamil Nadu states. The Sri Lankan species, C. illingworthorum, is found in the Eastern Province, Sri Lanka.

== Natural history ==
Both species of Calodactylodes live in rock crevices, are nocturnal, insectivorous, and very social, living in colonies of multiple individuals. During breeding seasons, the dominant male acquires a brilliant golden yellow colour all over the body, and hence the common name. Females and young ones are drab brown, camouflaging among the rocks. These geckos are very vocal, and their loud rattling calls are often to be heard inside the dark ravines. They reproduce by laying eggs. Females are communal nesters and many may lay their eggs (often numbering in thousands) together simultaneously in a safe and suitable rock crevice, away from predators' reach.
