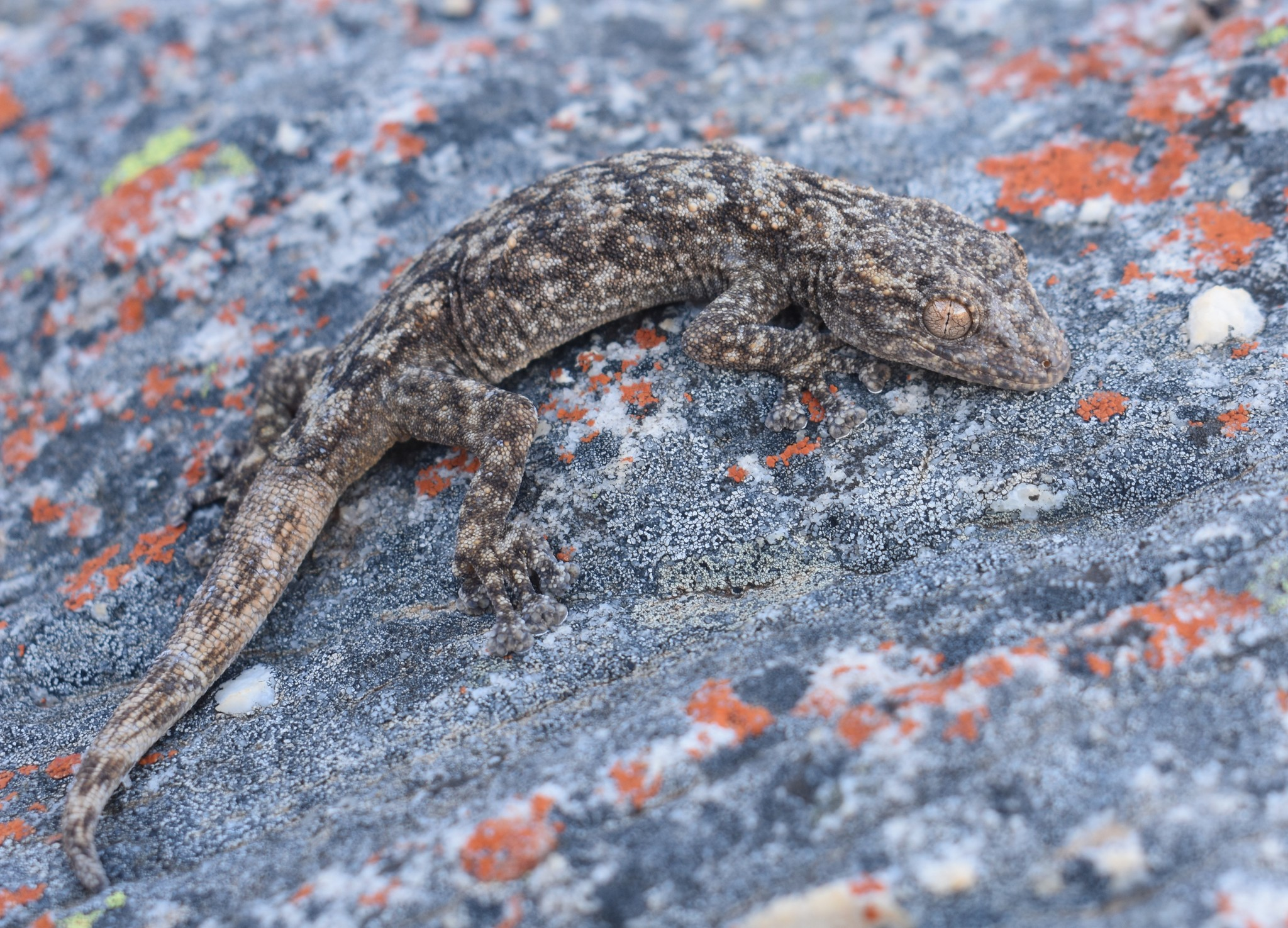

Conservation status
- Least Concern (IUCN 3.1)

Scientific classification
- Kingdom: Animalia
- Phylum: Chordata
- Class: Reptilia
- Order: Squamata
- Suborder: Gekkota
- Family: Gekkonidae
- Genus: Ramigekko; Heinicke, Daza, Greenbaum, Jackman & Bauer, 2014
- Species: R. swartbergensis

Binomial name
- Ramigekko swartbergensis (Haacke, 1996)

Synonyms
- Afrogecko swartbergensis; Phyllodactylus swartbergensis

= Ramigekko =

Swartberg leaf-toed gecko

Genus of lizards

Ramigekko swartbergensis, sometimes called the Swartberg (African) leaf-toed gecko, is a species of African gecko which is a localized endemic of the Cape Fold Belt in South Africa. It is monotypic in the genus Ramigekko.

== Anatomy ==
Like other "leaf-toed" geckoes, they have a single pair of enlarged adhesive pads on the terminally end of each digit. Only this species however has smoothed and flattened tubercles on its dorsal parts. The head has a deeper contour and some cranial differences (fusion of nasal and parietal bones) set them apart from most other gecko species.

== Range and habitat ==
It is found along the crests of the Swartberg and Klein Swartberg ranges, from Towerkop in the west to the vicinity of Meiringspoort. They favour north-facing sandstone outcrops in montane fynbos, from 1,300 to 2,100 m a.s.l. They occur in protected areas and are not endangered.

== Habits ==
They hide in rock cracks or under rock flakes, emerging to feed on insects. Like all "leaf-toed" geckoes they are nocturnal and lay hard-shelled eggs, which are deposited in clutches of two.
