= Peringuey's leaf-toed gecko =

Conservation status
- Least Concern (IUCN 3.1)

Scientific classification
- Kingdom: Animalia
- Phylum: Chordata
- Class: Reptilia
- Order: Squamata
- Suborder: Gekkota
- Family: Gekkonidae
- Genus: Cryptactites; Bauer et al., 1997
- Species: C. peringueyi

Binomial name
- Cryptactites peringueyi (Boulenger, 1910)

Synonyms
- Phyllodactylus peringueyi Boulenger, 1910

Species of lizard

Peringuey's leaf-toed gecko (Cryptactites peringueyi), also known commonly as the salt marsh gecko, is a species of lizard in the family Gekkonidae. The species is endemic to South Africa.

== Etymology ==
The specific name, peringueyi, is in honor of French entomologist Louis Péringuey.

== Description ==
Cryptactites peringueyi is particularly tiny, not growing more than about 5 centimetres (2.0 in) in total length (tail included), making it the smallest lizard in the region, along with the striped dwarf leaf-toed gecko (Goggia lineata) of the Western Cape. C. peringueyi has a red-brown body sometimes with thin, pale dark stripes.

== Behavior ==
Peringuey's leaf-toed gecko is nocturnal.

== Geographic distribution ==
Cryptactites peringueyi is found in Eastern Cape province, South Africa.

== Habitat ==
The preferred natural habitat of Cryptactites peringueyi is salt marsh, at elevations from sea level to 30 m (98 ft).

== Reproduction ==
Cryptactites peringueyi is oviparous. In summer the female lays a clutch of two tiny eggs in matted marsh vegetation.

== Conservation status ==
Cryptactites peringueyi was believed to be extinct for a long time, but in 1992 a tiny population was rediscovered near the estuary of the Kromme river.
