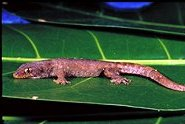
- Perochirus ateles

Scientific classification
- Domain: Eukaryota
- Kingdom: Animalia
- Phylum: Chordata
- Class: Reptilia
- Order: Squamata
- Infraorder: Gekkota
- Family: Gekkonidae
- Subfamily: Uroplatinae
- Genus: Perochirus; Boulenger, 1885

= Perochirus =

Genus of lizards

Perochirus is a genus of geckos endemic to the Philippines, Oceania, and Japan, commonly known as Micronesian geckos, Polynesian geckos, or tropical geckos.

== Species ==
Three species are recognized as being valid:

- Perochirus ateles (A.H.A. Duméril, 1856) – Duméril's tropical gecko, Micronesia saw-tailed gecko
- Perochirus guentheri Boulenger, 1885 – Günther's tropical gecko, Vanuatu saw-tailed gecko
- Perochirus scutellatus (Fischer, 1882) – shielded tropical gecko, atoll giant gecko

Nota bene: A binomial authority in parentheses indicates that the species was originally described in a genus other than Perochirus.
