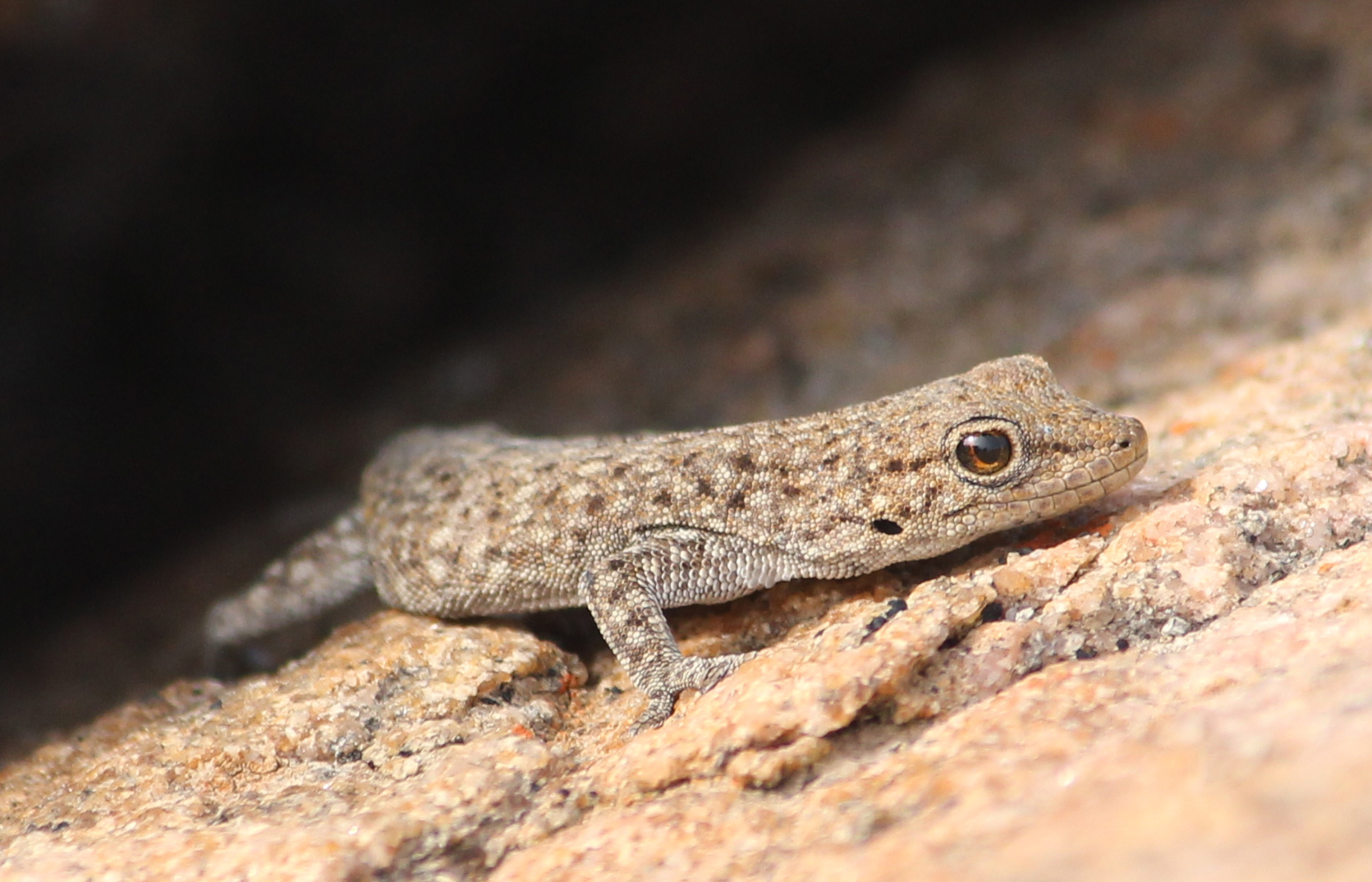

Conservation status
- Least Concern (IUCN 3.1)
- CITES Appendix II

Scientific classification
- Kingdom: Animalia
- Phylum: Chordata
- Class: Reptilia
- Order: Squamata
- Suborder: Gekkota
- Family: Gekkonidae
- Genus: Rhoptropella; Hewitt, 1937
- Species: R. ocellata

Binomial name
- Rhoptropella ocellata (Boulenger, 1885)
- Approximate distribution Range (Southern Africa)

Synonyms
- Rhoptropus ocellatus Boulenger, 1885; Phelsuma ocellata — Schmidt, 1933; Rhoptropella ocellata — Hewitt, 1937

= Rhoptropella =

Genus of lizards

Rhoptropella is a monotypic genus of lizard in the family Gekkonidae. The genus is indigenous to southern Africa.

== Species ==
The sole species in the genus Rhoptropella is Rhoptropella ocellata, although its generic allocation is debated.

== Common names ==
R. ocellata is known commonly as the Namaqua day gecko, the ocellated day gecko, and the spotted day gecko.

== Geographic range ==
R. ocellata is found in southwestern Namibia and South Africa (Little Namaqualand).

== Habitat ==
The preferred natural habitats of R. ocellata are desert and shrubland.

== Description ==
Adults of R. ocellata have a snout-to-vent length of 3–4 cm (1.2–1.6 in).

== Reproduction ==
R. ocellata is oviparous. Adult females lay clutches of 1–2 hard-shelled eggs. Each egg measures 8.5 by 6.5 mm (0.33 by 0.26 in).
