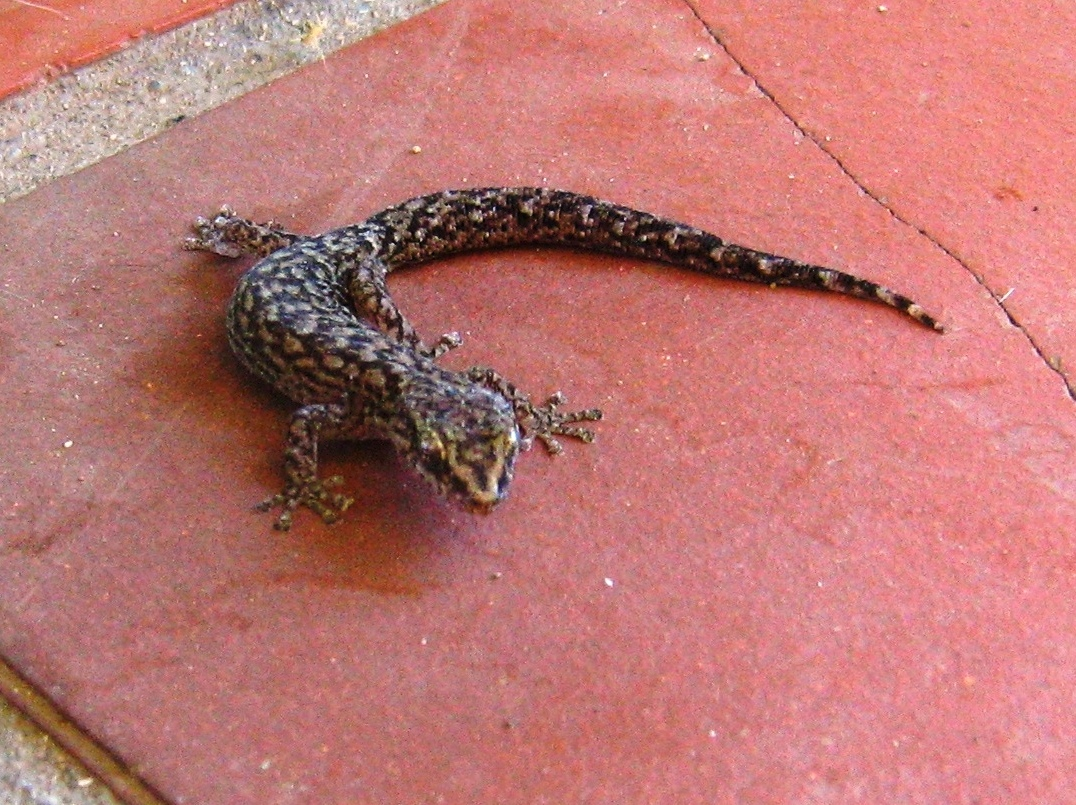

Conservation status
- Vulnerable (IUCN 3.1)

Scientific classification
- Kingdom: Animalia
- Phylum: Chordata
- Class: Reptilia
- Order: Squamata
- Suborder: Gekkota
- Family: Gekkonidae
- Genus: Afrogecko; Bauer, Good, & Branch, 1997
- Species: A. porphyreus

Binomial name
- Afrogecko porphyreus (Daudin, 1802)

Synonyms
- Gecko porphyreus Daudin, 1802 Phyllodactylus porphyreus (Daudin, 1802)

= Marbled leaf-toed gecko =

Species of lizard

The marbled leaf-toed gecko (Afrogecko porphyreus) is a gecko found in southern and southwestern South Africa (including many offshore islands) and in Namibia. It is a flat, medium-sized gecko.

== Description ==
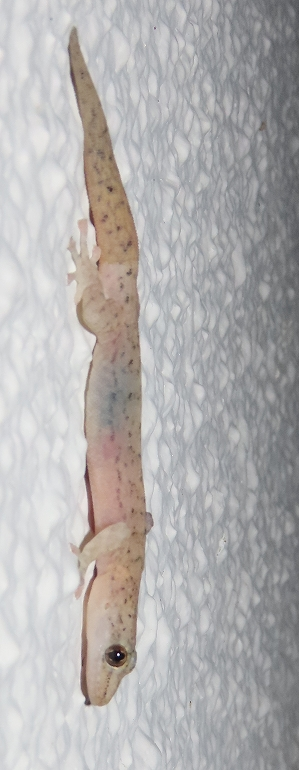
Afrogecko porphyreus, Cape marbled gecko, male with a regenerated tail. Unusually pale in colour.

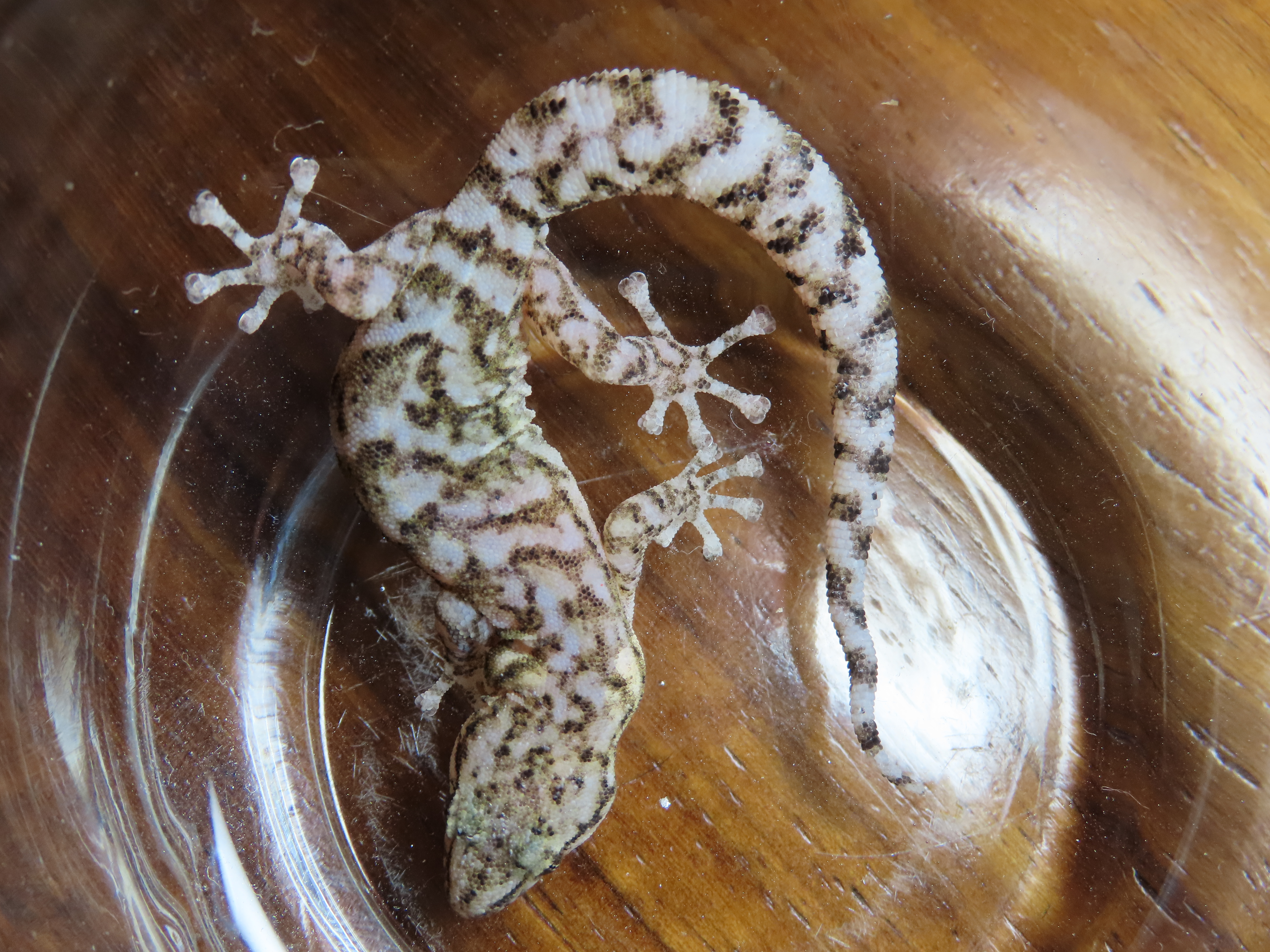
Afrogecko porphyreus, Cape marbled gecko with a vivid colour pattern. The pale calcium-rich swellings behind the jaw angles indicate that it is a female.

Afrogecko porphyreus has a mottled, greyish body, a long tail and sometimes a pale stripe along its back. However, its colouration varies from almost black-and-buff patterning to smudged shades of buff. It is an adaptable little forager, hiding under debris, beneath bark, among rocks, and even in city houses.

These geckos eat large numbers of small insects, so a population of them living on one's property serves as a natural form of pest-control. Their diet is an array of invertebrates, including feeder insects. Domestic cats commonly kill large numbers of these lizards, sometimes exterminating them in a local area. They also are preyed upon by species of spiders in the genus Palystes, which may be more effective gecko predators than cats.

As in many similar gecko species, one of their major defences is autotomy of their tails. In some populations nearly all mature specimens have tails that have either regenerated or are in the process of regeneration.

== Distribution ==
This gecko occurs commonly in the southern parts of South Africa, from Cape Town (where it now inhabits suburban gardens) eastwards as far as the Eastern Cape.

A. porphyreus are not aggressive or territorial and several of them will often live together in a single retreat. These sociable lizards will even share nests, in which several females will lay their eggs.
