= Narudasia =

Conservation status
- Least Concern (IUCN 3.1)

Scientific classification
- Kingdom: Animalia
- Phylum: Chordata
- Class: Reptilia
- Order: Squamata
- Suborder: Gekkota
- Family: Gekkonidae
- Genus: Narudasia; Methuen and Hewitt, 1914
- Species: N. festiva

Binomial name
- Narudasia festiva Methuen and Hewitt, 1914

Genus of lizards

Narudasia is a monotypic genus of geckos endemic to Namibia better known as festive gecko.

- Festive gecko (Narudasia festiva) is a diurnal, rock-dwelling gecko, reaching 2 to 3 inches in length, that lives on small insects. Body and head are somewhat flattened. Overall color is grey with alternating brownish bands on the back, edged with black and white towards the rear. The long tail may be yellow.
