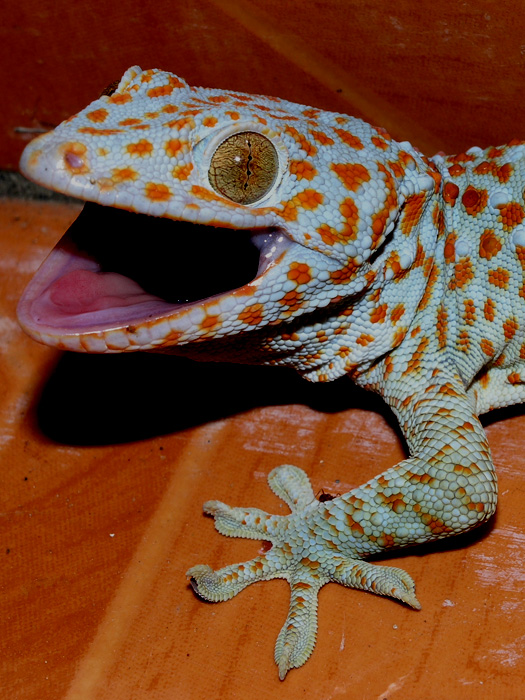
- Tokay gecko (Gekko gecko)

Scientific classification
- Kingdom: Animalia
- Phylum: Chordata
- Class: Reptilia
- Order: Squamata
- Suborder: Gekkota
- Superfamily: Gekkonoidea
- Family: Gekkonidae; Gray, 1825

Subfamilies
- Uroplatinae; Gekkoninae
- Gekkonidae distribution

= Gekkonidae =

Gekkonidae Temporal range: Eocene - Recent Ypresian–Holocene

Family of lizards

Gekkonidae (the common geckos) is the largest family of geckos, containing over 950 described species in 62 genera. The Gekkonidae contain many of the most widespread gecko species, including house geckos (Hemidactylus), the tokay gecko (Gekko), day geckos (Phelsuma), the mourning gecko (Lepidodactylus), and dtellas (Gehyra). Gekkonid geckos occur globally and are particularly diverse in tropical areas. Many species of these geckos exhibit an adhering ability to surfaces through Van der Waals forces utilizing intermolecular forces between molecules of their setae (foot hair) and molecules of the surface they are on.

The genus Hemidactylus is one of the most species-rich and widely distributed of all reptile genera.

== Fossils ==
The family Gekkonidae is a member of the infraorder Gekkota, which seems to have first emerged during the Jurassic period (201–145 million years ago). Eichstaettisaurus schroederi is recognized as one of the earliest examples of an ancestral gecko species. Members of the genus Eichstaettisaurus display morphological adaptations associated with climbing. Eichstaettisaurus has been ranked as a stem gekkotan, but its true taxonomic rank is unclear.

The species Hoburogekko suchanovi and Gobekko cretacicus, dated to the Albian-Aptian ages (121–100 million years ago) ages of the Cretaceous period, are unquestionably members of Gekkota. They are thought to be members of the Gekkonidae, as well, but their taxonomic rank is uncertain due to the incompleteness of the fossil remains.

Yantarogekko balticus is the earliest known gekkonid gecko. Y. balticus was discovered in Baltic amber dated to the Eocene epoch (56–33.9 million years ago). This species was small, measuring only 20–22 mm from snout to vent. Y. balticus has enlarged, undivided scansorial pads and a reduced but strongly clawed first digit, and lacks movable eyelids. Together, these morphological traits are distinctive of the family Gekkonidae, and also indicate that Y. balticus may have had adhesive abilities similar to modern geckos.

== Distribution ==
Species within the Gekkonidae inhabit every warm region. Furthermore, many genera are capable of widespread geographical habitation, and can be considered invasive in some areas; the genus Hemidactylus can be identified in all subtropical areas of the world. However, many genera in the family Gekkonidae are endemic. For example, genera Afroedura and Afrogecko are found only in Africa. The range of genus Lepidodactylus stretches from South Asia to Oceania; this genus also accounts for several island species. The genera listed here do not account for all Gekkonidae subspecies and are used only as examples of distribution. For a full list, see section 'Genera'.

== Genera ==
Gekkonidae contains these genera:

- Afroedura (34 species) African rock geckos
- Afrogecko (1 species) marbled leaf-toed gecko
- Agamura (3 species) Persian spider geckos
- Ailuronyx (3 species) Seychelles bronze geckos, skin-sloughing geckos
- Alsophylax (8 species) Central Asian even-fingered geckos
- Altiphylax (5 species)
- Ancylodactylus (19 species) African day geckos
- Bauerius (1 species)
- Blaesodactylus (6 species) Madagascar velvet geckos
- Bunopus (3 species)
- Calodactylodes (2 species) golden geckos
- †Cadurcogekko (2 species)
- Chondrodactylus (6 species)
- Christinus (3 species) Australian marbled geckos
- Cnemaspis (200 species) Asian day geckos
- Crossobamon (2 species)
- Cryptactites – Peringuey's leaf-toed gecko
- Cyrtodactylus (346 species) Asian bent-toed geckos
- Cyrtopodion (25 species)
- Dixonius (14 species) Asian leaf-toed geckos
- Dravidogecko (7 species)
- Ebenavia (6 species)
- Elasmodactylus (2 species) East African thick-toed geckos
- Geckolepis (5 species) fish scale geckos
- Gehyra (68 species) dtellas, web-toed geckos
- Gekko (87 species) true geckos
- Goggia (10 species) dwarf leaf-toed geckos
- Hemidactylus (195 species) house geckos
- Hemiphyllodactylus (55 species) half leaf-fingered geckos
- Heteronotia (5 species) prickly geckos
- Homopholis (4 species) African velvet geckos
- Kolekanos (2 species)
- Lakigecko (1 species)
- Lepidodactylus (44 species) scaly-toed geckos
- Luperosaurus (9 species) fringed geckos
- Lygodactylus (82 species) dwarf geckos
- Matoatoa (2 species)
- Mediodactylus (17 species)
- Microgecko (8 species)
- Nactus (35 species) Oceanian slender-toed geckos
- Narudasia - festive gecko
- Pachydactylus (58 species) African thick-toed geckos
- Paragehyra (4 species)
- Paroedura (25 species) – Madagascar ground geckos
- Parsigecko – Ziaie's Pars-gecko
- Perochirus (3 species) Micronesian geckos
- Phelsuma (53 species)
- Pseudoceramodactylus – Gulf short-fingered gecko
- Pseudogekko (10 species) false geckos
- Ptenopus (3 species) barking geckos
- Ptychozoon (13 species) parachute geckos
- Ramigekko – Swartberg African leaf-toed gecko
- Rhinogekko (2 species)
- Rhoptropella – Namaqua day gecko
- Rhoptropus (9 species) Namib day geckos
- Stenodactylus (10 species) North African short-fingered geckos
- Tenuidactylus (8 species)
- Trachydactylus (2 species)
- Trigonodactylus (4 species) Middle Eastern short-fingered geckos
- Tropiocolotes (15 species) North African sand geckos
- Urocotyledon (6 species)
- Uroplatus (22 species) Madagascar flat-tailed geckos

Possibly belonging to the family:

†Yantarogekko (fossil)

== Phylogeny ==
Pyron, et al. (2013) presents the following classification of Gekkonidae genera, based on molecular phylogenetics.

- Gekkonidae
  - - Lepidodactylus, Pseudogekko, Luperosaurus, Gekko, Dixonius, Heteronotia, Nactus, Hemiphyllodactylus, Gehyra
    - Alsophylax, Tropiocolotes, Cnemaspis, Mediodactylus, Pseudoceramodactylus, Tropiocolotes, Stenodactylus, Bunopus, Crossobamon, Agamura, Cyrtopodion, Cyrtodactylus, Hemidactylus
  - Perochirus, Urocotyledon, Ebenavia, Paroedura, Ailuronyx, Calodactylodes, Ptenopus, Narudasia, Cnemaspis, Uroplatus, Paragehyra, Christinus, Afrogecko, Cryptactites, Matoatoa, Afroedura, Geckolepis, Homopholis, Blaesodactylus, Goggia, Rhoptropus, Elasmodactylus, Chondrodactylus, Colopus, Pachydactylus, Cnemaspis, Rhoptropella, Lygodactylus, Phelsuma
