= Bodinger =

Bodinger is a German surname. Notable people with the surname include:

- Herzl Bodinger (1943–2025), Israeli general
- Klaus Bodinger (1932–1994), German swimmer

== See also ==
- Bolinger
- Budinger
