= Victor-Thérèse Charpentier =

- Reign: 17??-1776

Count of Ennery I image= /Users/tainadenize/Desktop/46.jpg
- Born: 24 March 1732; Paris, France
- Died: December 13, 1776 (aged 44); Port-au-Prince, Saint-Domingue
- Spouse: Rose d'Alesso; Olive Puybaudet
- Issue: Pauline François de Paule Charpentier, Duchess of Levis; Geneviève Pauline Aimée Charpentier
- House: House of Charpentier
- Father: Thomas-Jacques Charpentier
- Mother: Madeleine-Angelique Rioult de Douilly

Victor-Thérèse Charpentier d'Ennery (March 24, 1732 – December 13, 1776) was the marquis, and later count, of Ennery and was also a governor general of Saint-Domingue in the mid-to-late 18th century.

== Family ==
Charpentier was born in Paris, France to Thomas-Jacques Charpentier d'Ennery and Madeleine Angélique Rioult de Curzay. Charpentier d'Ennery is the grandson of Jacques Charpentier d'Ennery, the Lord of D'Ennery and Espier. He had a sister, Cécile Pauline Charpentier d'Ennery, who married Gilbert de Chauvigny de Blot, a governor of Chantelle. On January 11, 1768, in Paris, he married Benedicte d'Alesso, a descendant of Philip I of France, and had one child:

~Pauline François de Paule Charpentier (died 1819) married Pierre-Marc-Gaston de Lévis, son of Francois de Gaston, Chevalier de Levis.

Charpentier also had another child with Olive Puybaudet:

~Geneviève Pauline Aimée Charpentier (1776–1850), who married Louis de Tibi (died 1802) and then married Joseph Castel.

== Accomplishments ==
Charpentier was Count and later the Marquis of d'Ennery and also the governor-general of Saint-Domingue. He was also the Governor of Martinique from 1765 to 1768 and also the governor general of the Windward Islands from 1768 to 1771, four years before his death.

== Descendants ==
1) Pauline d'Ennery

        Adele-Charlotte, Duchess of Levis
                    
                     Raymond de Nicolay
                     Aymar de Nicolay

      Gaston Francois, Duke of Levis

2) ???

3) Aimée CASTEL née D'ENNERY (many descendants, including):

       Elisabeth Henriette DÉJOIE FRANGEUL née CASTEL
          Charles FRANGEUL 
             Julia PRÉZEAU née FRANGEUL
               Yvonne LIAUTAUD née PRÉZEAU
                   Gerard LIAUTAUD
                       Olivier Liautaud
                   Colette SANSARICQ née LIAUTAUD
                       Reginald SANSARICQ
                                      Noëlle PEREZ née SANSARICQ
                                              George PEREZ
                                              Thomas PEREZ
                                      Renée SANSARICQ
                                      Julian SANSARICQ
                       Evelyne ORESKOVICH née SANSARICQ
                       Jean Paul SANSARICQ
                   Jacqueline MANGONES née LIAUTAUD
                       Jean Gilbert ROOZEN
                       Josette TKACIK née ROOZEN
                                      Tomas Tkacik

== Noble Titles ==
Because of his inability to produce a male heir, the title Count d'Ennery was not succeeded and died out after his death.

== Death ==
Victor-Therese Charpentier died on December 31, 1776, in Port-au-Prince, during the Uprisings. His final resting place is in a large, beautiful memorial commissioned by his widow and his sister, the Madame de Blot. The memorial portrays his widow and sister grieving by his grave with child. The memorial can be found in the Louvre Museum.
