= Euergetism =

Practice of wealthy individuals distributing wealth to the community

Euergetism (or evergetism, from the Greek εὐεργετέω, "do good deeds") was the ancient practice of high-status and wealthy individuals in society distributing part of their wealth to the community. This practice was also part of the patron-client relation system of Roman society. The term was coined by French historian André Boulanger and subsequently used in the works of Paul Veyne.

== Development in the Hellenistic period ==
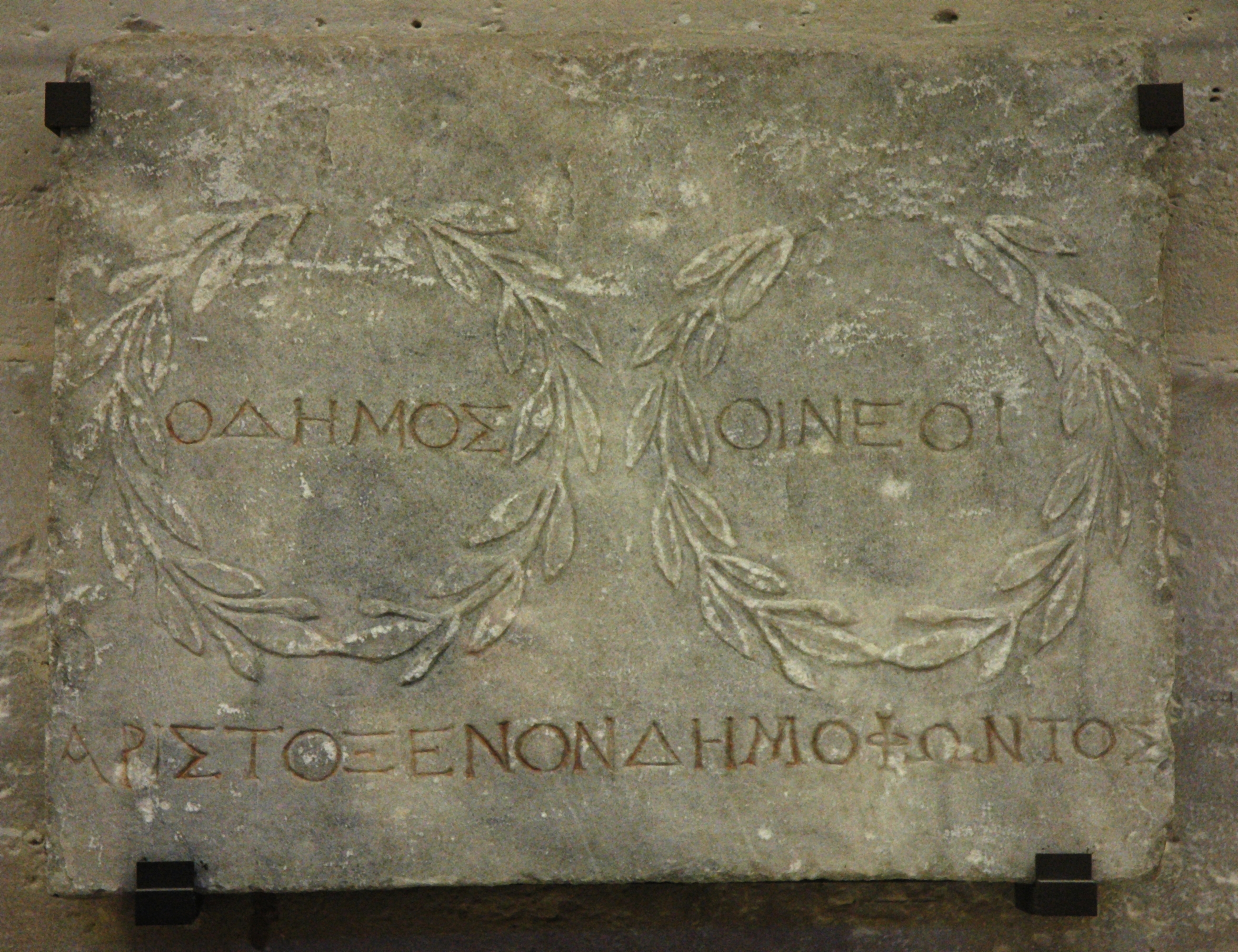
Inscription honoring Aristoxenos, son of Demophon probably benefactor of the gymnasium in Athens, late third or second century BC., Musée du Louvre.

During the second half of the 4th century BC, profound changes occurred in the financing of public institutions. Without funding from wealthy individuals, at least symbolically, the legitimacy of these institutions could be called into question by the city. The idea emerged that the rich people were not contributing as they should, unless required or compelled to do so. At the same time, around 355 BC, Demosthenes mentioned the lack of contributions from the rich in his Against Leptines, as did Xenophon in Poroi.

At the end of the century, Demetrius Phalereus abolished the two most important Athenian institutions. The trierarchy, a tax to support the building of triremes, was no longer necessary because Athens withdrew from the international arena after his defeat in 322. Furthermore, the post of choregus, a kind of powerful cultural programmer supporting many institutions, was replaced by an elected and state-funded judiciary – "the presidential contest (agonothésie), whose funding was supported by the State".

However, many honorary decrees were available, showing that the amounts incurred by them voluntarily to supplement those supported by the city far exceeded the cost of the former choregus. Thus, in 284/83, the agonothetai elected, the poet Philippides, was no longer reimbursed by the city for money he had spent. Similarly, some old magistrates were often funded by their owner: in Athens, priests generally provided the victims of sacrifice, when the cosmetic and continues to oversee the ephebia in the Hellenistic period, that is now on his own money that finances most of the sacrifices, prizes for competitions, and routine maintenance of equipment and buildings. Although no document mentions as such that the holder of the office shall assume the financial cost of its charge, entries published annually in his honor shows that oversees the flow of the institution, some emphasizing that this city does not have to spend this year.

Thus gradually it was chosen to operate close to the philanthropy, which, like Aristotle wrote, "to safeguard the oligarchs" for the most important [...], magistrates must attach their public expenditure, so that people do not agree to participate and have the same indulgence to the judges that they must pay their judiciaries of a large sum. Therefore, "at their facility, judges will make magnificent sacrifices, and build some monuments and the people, then taking part in the banquets and feasts, and seeing the city splendidly decorated temples and buildings, wish to maintain the constitution and it will be for the rich as many beautiful testimonies of items they made.

However, until the middle of the 2nd century BC, the Greek philanthropy did not match the definition in Veyne. As demonstrated Philip Gauthier, this is a philanthropy that takes place most often "exclusively in official and civil (judicial and official business)". Moreover, in the 4th century BC and perhaps even the high Hellenistic period, the city did not create for his benefactors (benefactors) of separate status, superior to other citizens, and it recognizes their quality and not the title of benefactor. She thanked them and "get up with his service as any other citizen, but with higher average", the same way that voluntary contributions (epidoseis) enabled everyone, in proportion to his income, to demonstrate its commitment to the city by a gift of many talents or just a few pence.

Euergetism, as they developed next to a liturgical system "which is both a continuation and denial", allowed the city to direct its service expenditures of the richest of its members with greater emphasis before the official honors due to them in thanks. The latter could thus be obtained, whenever necessary, that funding is assured for the most urgent of needs, without incurring unnecessary costs, and without giving the feeling of stress to members of its elite, which retain the ability to book their wealth to their personal use.

The gradual disappearance of the liturgies occurred in the shift of the vocabulary of the Hellenistic period: the name leitourgia – and the verb leitourgein – loses its meaning strictly "expenditure imposed by the city" to mean "any part taken in an expenditure of public interest", including in conjunction with a public office (judicial or priesthood).

This dilution of the immune system from euergetism to liturgy will be completed towards the end of the Hellenistic period. Financing cities can then be compared to that in force throughout the Roman Empire at that time, the full euergetism analyzed by Veyne in his book Bread and Circuses.

== Hellenistic generosity ==
Hellenistic generosity is a social practice in which rich people help the poor. It became a moral obligation for the wealthy citizens when seeking high magistrate positions in the Roman Republic, such as consul, praetor or aedile. The notion of generosity towards poorer citizens included provision for entertainments and civic banquets but also city amenities such as theatres, odeions (concert and lecture halls), libraries, baths, gymnasiums, fountains and markets that bore the inscription that so and so "built or repaired this D.S.P.F. (de sua pecunia fecit, 'done with his own money')."

== End of euergetism ==
From the 3rd century AD on, economic pressures made euergetism more difficult to practice, and was largely replaced with imperial funds taken from the provincial or diocesan budgets. Private euergetism eventually disappeared after Justinian's death and was replaced by the ecclesial charitable schemes.

== See also ==
- Liturgy (ancient Greece)
- Noblesse oblige
- Paternalistic conservatism
- Philanthropy
- The Giving Pledge
- "The Gospel of Wealth"
- Jublains archeological site discusses an example

== Bibliography ==
- Baslez, Marie-Françoise, ed. (2007). Économies et sociétés – Grèce ancienne 478–88 (in French). Paris: Atlande. ISBN 978-2-35030-051-1.
- Beck, Mark (2015). Der politische Euergetismus und dessen vor allem nichtbürgerliche Rezipienten im hellenistischen und kaiserzeitlichen Kleinasien sowie dem ägäischen Raum, Rahden/Westf.
- Domingo Gygax, Marc (2016). Benefaction and Rewards in the Ancient Greek City. The Origins of Euergetism, Cambridge.
- Erdtmann, Jörg (2025). Ehre und Inklusion. Versorgungsleistungen, Solidarität und Euergetismus im privaten Kultvereinswesen des hellenistischen Athen, Münster.
- Habicht, Christian (2000). Athènes hellénistique (in French). Les Belles Lettres.

Roland Oetjen: An Economic Model of Greek Euergetism. In: Roland Oetjen (Hrsg.): "New Perspectives in Seleucid History, Numismatics and Archaeology." Studies in Honor of Getzel M. Cohen. De Gruyter, Berlin/Boston 2020, pp. 108–122.

- Ouhlen, Jacques (2004). "La société athénienne". In Brulé, Pierre; Descat, Raymond (eds.). Le monde grec aux temps classiques (in French). Vol. 2 : le IVe siècle. Presses Universitaires de France. ISBN 2-13-051545-2.
- Veyne, Paul (1990) [1976]. Le pain et le cirque. Sociologie historique d'un pluralisme politique [Bread and circuses: historical sociology and political pluralism]. Point Histoire (in French). Éditions du Seuil.
- Zuiderhoek, Arjan (2009). The Politics of Munificence in the Roman Empire. Citizens, Elites, and Benefactors in Asia Minor, Cambridge.

== Suggested Reading ==
An excellent source for understanding the patron/client system in the Classical world is Arjan Zuiderhoek's ″The Politics of Munificence in the Roman Empire″.
