= Boullanger =

Boullanger could refer to:

- Boullanger Island, island near Jurien Bay, Western Australia, Australia
- Cape Boullanger, southernmost point of Dorre Island, in the Shire of Shark Bay, Western Australia, Australia
- Boullanger (surname)

== See also ==
- Boulanger, French-language surname
- Robbins Passage and Boullanger Bay Important Bird Area, in Tasmania, Australia
