= Blaesodactylus =

Scientific classification
- Kingdom: Animalia
- Phylum: Chordata
- Class: Reptilia
- Order: Squamata
- Suborder: Gekkota
- Family: Gekkonidae
- Subfamily: Uroplatinae
- Genus: Blaesodactylus; Boettger, 1893
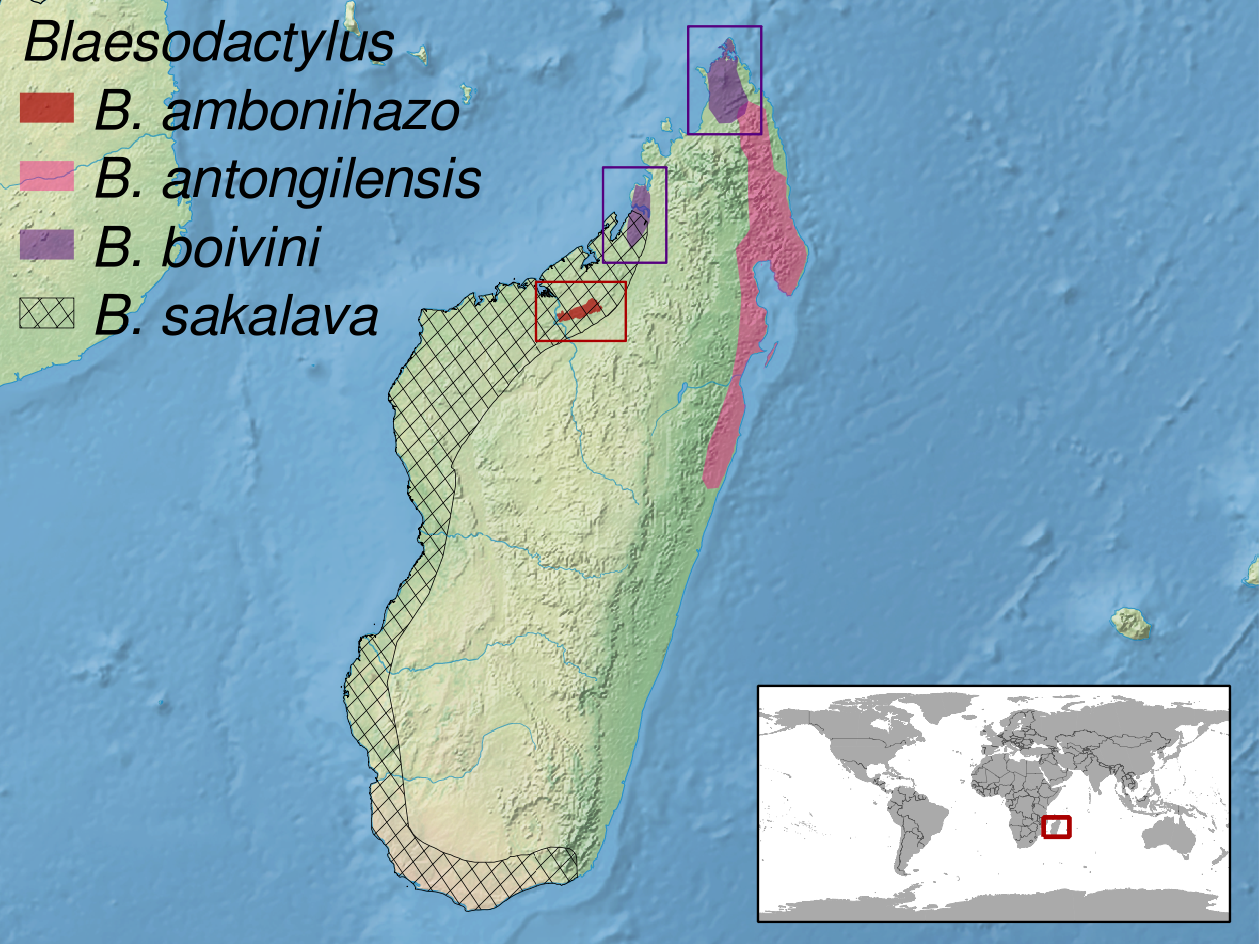

Genus of lizards

Blaesodactylus is a genus of six species of lizards, endemic to Madagascar, commonly known as velvet geckos, and formerly considered part of the genus Homopholis.

== Description ==
The species are generally similar, with small, conical scales on their dorsal surfaces, with overall dullish coloration, and a pattern of distinct transverse bands.

== Species ==
The following six species are recognized.

- Blaesodactylus ambonihazo Bauer, Glaw, Gehring & Vences, 2011
- Blaesodactylus antongilensis (Böhme & Meier, 1980)
- Blaesodactylus boivini (A.M.C. Duméril, 1856)
- Blaesodactylus microtuberculatus Jono, Brennan, Bauer & Glaw, 2015
- Blaesodactylus sakalava (Grandidier, 1867)
- Blaesodactylus victori Iniech, Glaw & Vences, 2016
