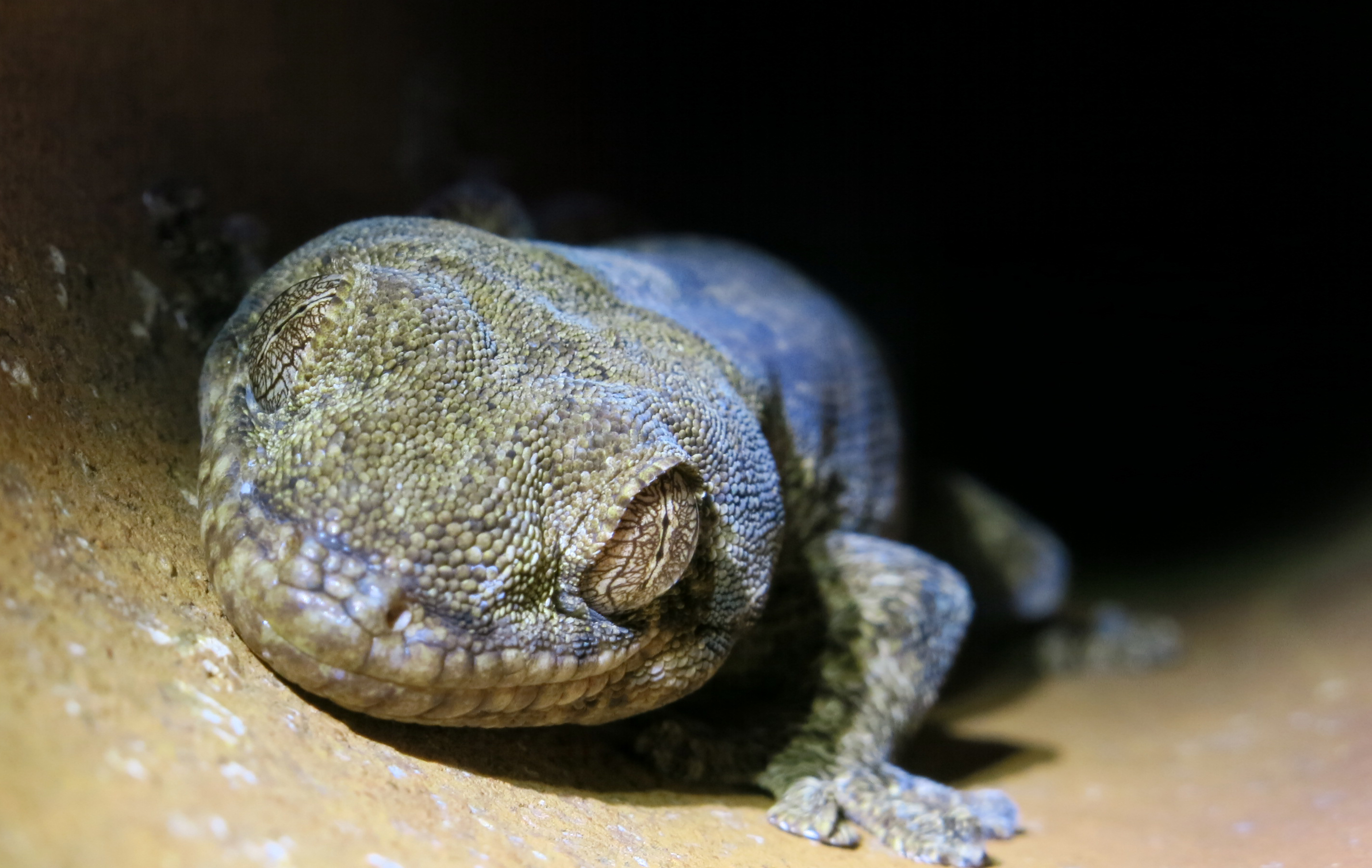

Conservation status
- Least Concern (IUCN 3.1)

Scientific classification
- Kingdom: Animalia
- Phylum: Chordata
- Class: Reptilia
- Order: Squamata
- Suborder: Gekkota
- Family: Gekkonidae
- Genus: Homopholis
- Species: H. wahlbergii

Binomial name
- Homopholis wahlbergii (A. Smith, 1849)
- Distribution in south-east Africa according to the IUCN. Extant (resident)

Synonyms
- Geko walbergii A. Smith, 1849; Homopholis wahlbergii — Boulenger, 1885; Homopholis macrolepis Boulenger, 1885; Platypholis walbergii — Kluge, 1993; Homopholis wahlbergi — Branch, 1993

= Wahlberg's velvet gecko =

Species of lizard

Wahlberg's velvet gecko (Homopholis wahlbergii) is a species of large gecko, a lizard in the family Gekkonidae. The species occurs exclusively in Southern Africa.

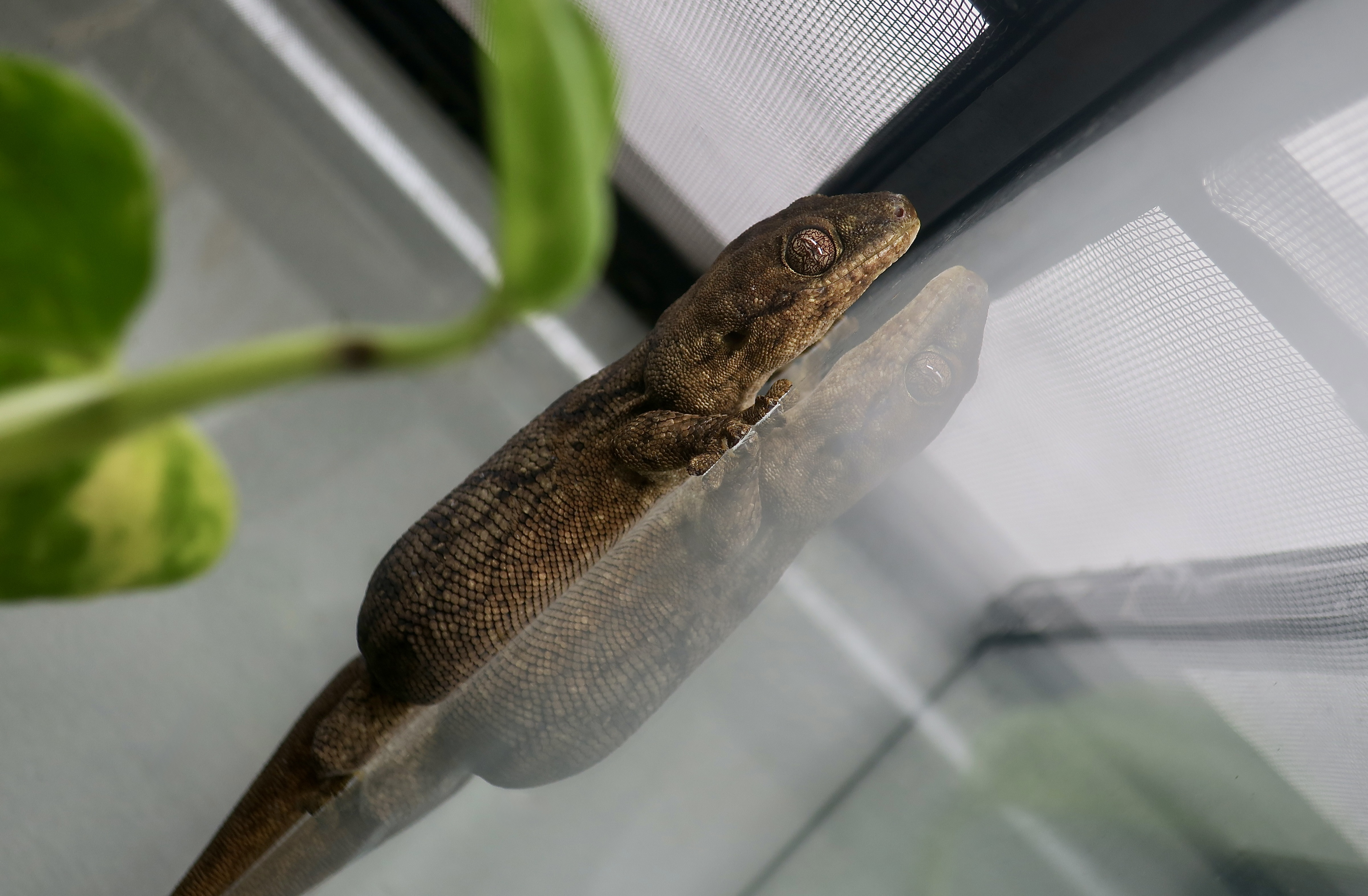
A Wahlberg's velvet gecko at The Gecko Gallery NYC.

== Etymology ==
The specific name, wahlbergii, is in honour of Swedish naturalist Johan August Wahlberg. The spelling walbergii was corrected to wahlbergii by Smith (1849) in an errata within an addenda slip (unpaginated).

== Geographic range ==
H. wahlbergii is endemic to Miombo and Mopane bushveld of Botswana, South Africa, Eswatini, Zimbabwe, and Mozambique. The largest part of its range covers Zimbabwe.

== Habitat ==
H. wahlbergii shelters under tree bark, rocks, empty bird nests, and other places in coastal bush and mesic and arid savannas.

== Description ==
Wahlberg's velvet gecko is so called because the skin looks and feels like velvet. The back varies from dark grey to soft grey-brown and may be crossed with paler chevrons or crossbars or have mottled paler areas nestled along the centre of its back and spine. Adults may attain a total length (including tail) of 21 cm (8.3 in), but average total length is 14–18 cm (5.5–7.1 in).

== Behaviour ==
H. wahlbergii is nocturnal; however, it has been observed to occasionally be active during the day. It ventures far from its usual roost only at night, when courtship generally occurs. It is frequently found in baobab trees and in the roofs and walls of traditional mud-huts and other human dwellings.

== Diet ==
H. wahlbergii is mainly insectivores. Beetles make up the majority of its diet, with butterflies making up the next largest proportion, although it can also consume millipedes.

== Breeding ==
Males and females of H. wahlbergii exhibit little to no sexual dimorphism. Females reproduce annually once they reach sexual maturity. The female lays pairs of large, hard-shelled eggs that start soft and adhesive. Egg length, 17–19 mm (0.67–0.75 in), is not correlated to maternal length. These eggs are concealed under bark overhangs or in rock crevices.
