= Boullanger (surname) =

Boullanger is a surname. Notable people with the surname include:

- André Boullanger, French Roman Catholic monk
- Charles-Pierre Boullanger, French geographer
- Roland Boullanger (1939–2020), French breaststroke swimmer

== See also ==
- Boulanger, French-language surname
