= Blaesodactylus microtuberculatus =

Scientific classification
- Kingdom: Animalia
- Phylum: Chordata
- Order: Squamata
- Suborder: Gekkota
- Family: Gekkonidae
- Genus: Blaesodactylus
- Species: B. microtuberculatus

Binomial name
- Blaesodactylus microtuberculatus Jono, Brennan, Bauer, & Glaw, 2015

Species of lizard

Blaesodactylus microtuberculatus is a species of gecko endemic to Madagascar.
