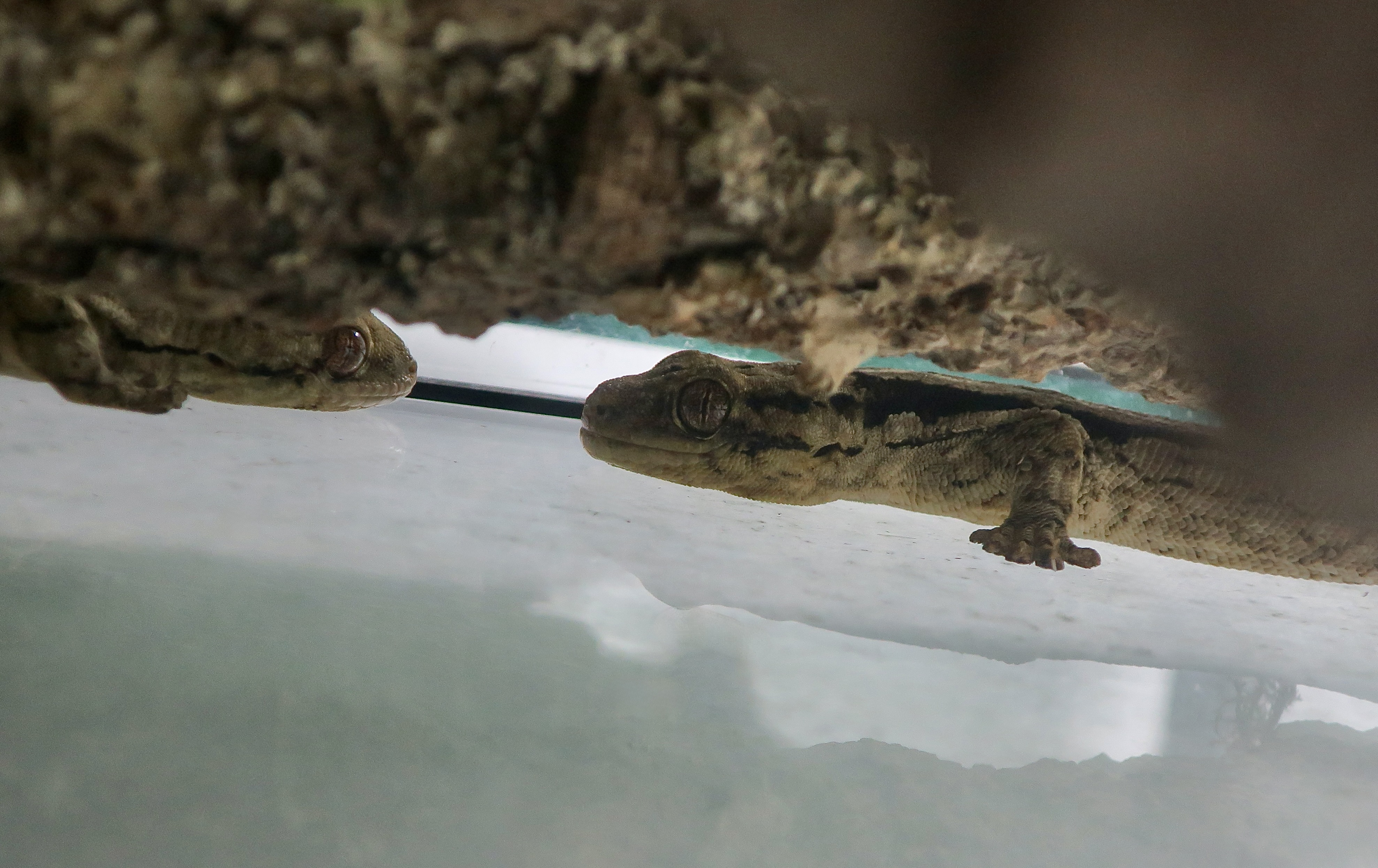

Scientific classification
- Kingdom: Animalia
- Phylum: Chordata
- Class: Reptilia
- Order: Squamata
- Suborder: Gekkota
- Family: Gekkonidae
- Genus: Homopholis
- Species: H. arnoldi

Binomial name
- Homopholis arnoldi Loveridge, 1944

Synonyms
- Homopholis wahlbergii arnoldi

= Homopholis arnoldi =

Species of lizard

Homopholis arnoldi is a species of gecko. It is endemic to southern Zimbabwe.
