= Blaesodactylus victori =

Scientific classification
- Kingdom: Animalia
- Phylum: Chordata
- Class: Reptilia
- Order: Squamata
- Suborder: Gekkota
- Family: Gekkonidae
- Genus: Blaesodactylus
- Species: B. victori

Binomial name
- Blaesodactylus victori Ineich, Glaw, & Vences, 2016

Species of lizard

Blaesodactylus victori is a species of geckos endemic to Madagascar.
