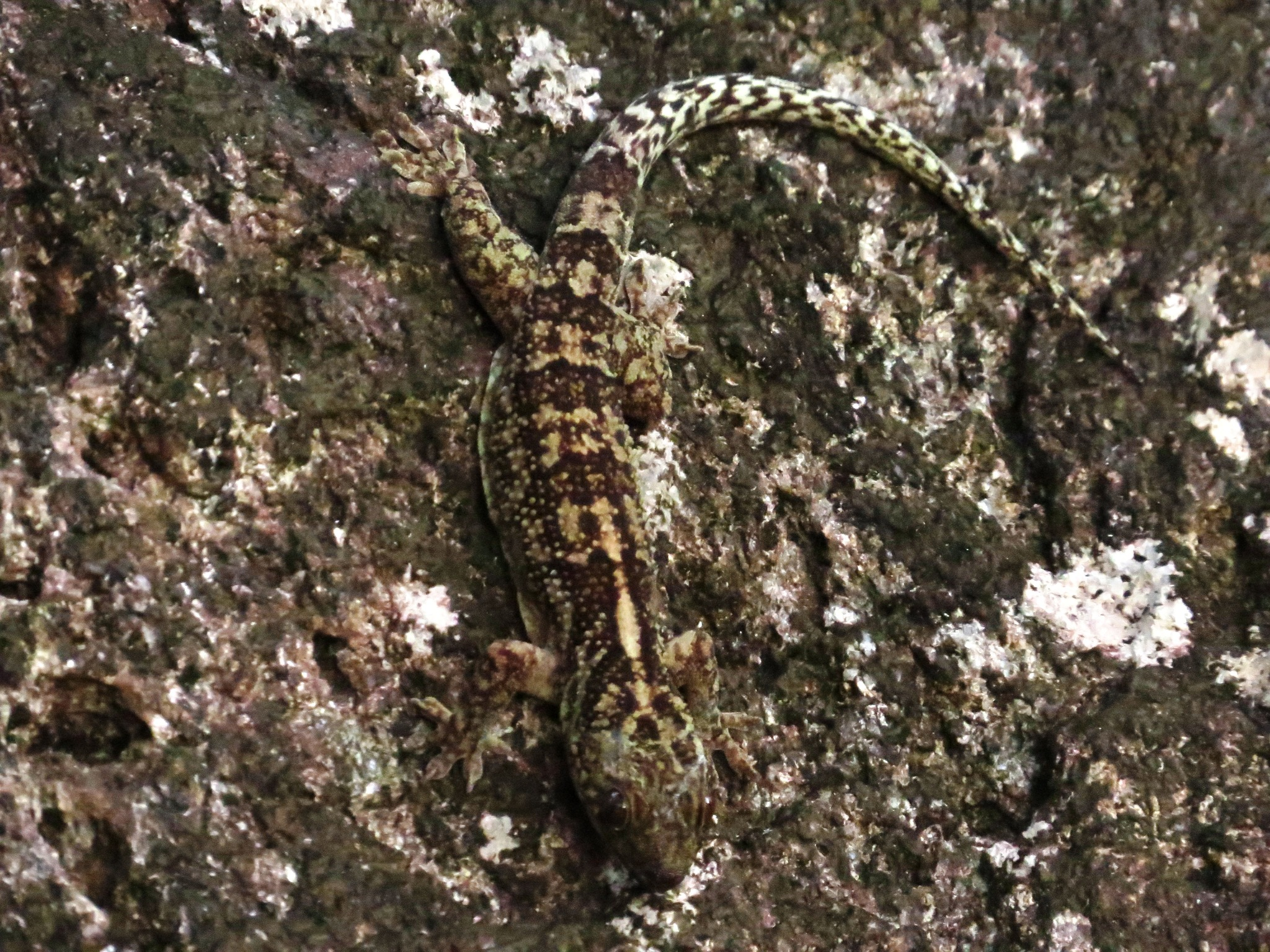

Conservation status
- Least Concern (IUCN 3.1)

Scientific classification
- Kingdom: Animalia
- Phylum: Chordata
- Class: Reptilia
- Order: Squamata
- Suborder: Gekkota
- Family: Gekkonidae
- Genus: Blaesodactylus
- Species: B. antongilensis

Binomial name
- Blaesodactylus antongilensis (Böhme & Meier, 1980)
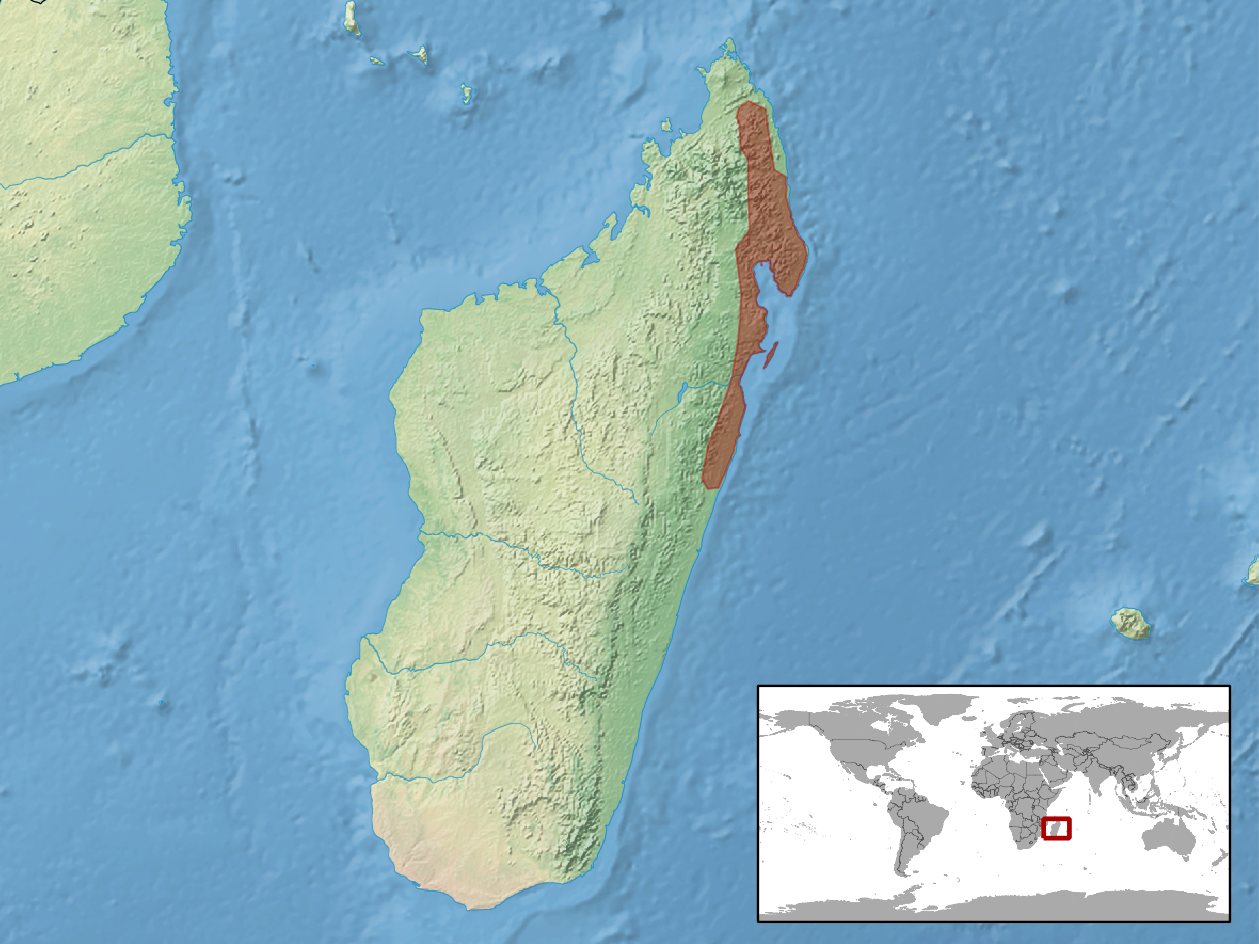

Synonyms
- Homopholis antongilensis

= Blaesodactylus antongilensis =

Species of lizard

Blaesodactylus antongilensis is a species of gecko endemic to Madagascar.
