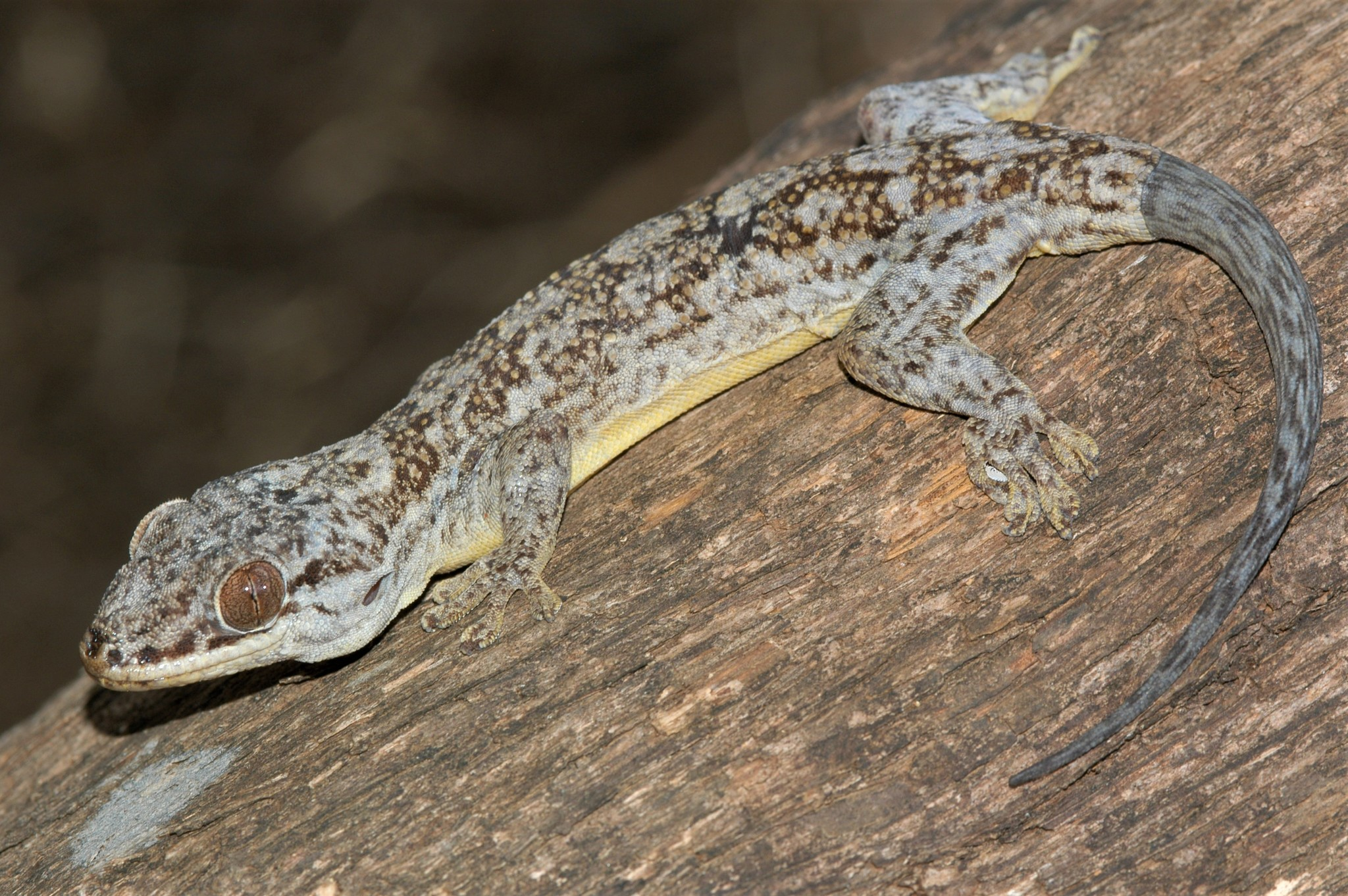

Conservation status
- Least Concern (IUCN 3.1)

Scientific classification
- Kingdom: Animalia
- Phylum: Chordata
- Class: Reptilia
- Order: Squamata
- Suborder: Gekkota
- Family: Gekkonidae
- Genus: Blaesodactylus
- Species: B. sakalava

Binomial name
- Blaesodactylus sakalava (Grandidier, 1867)
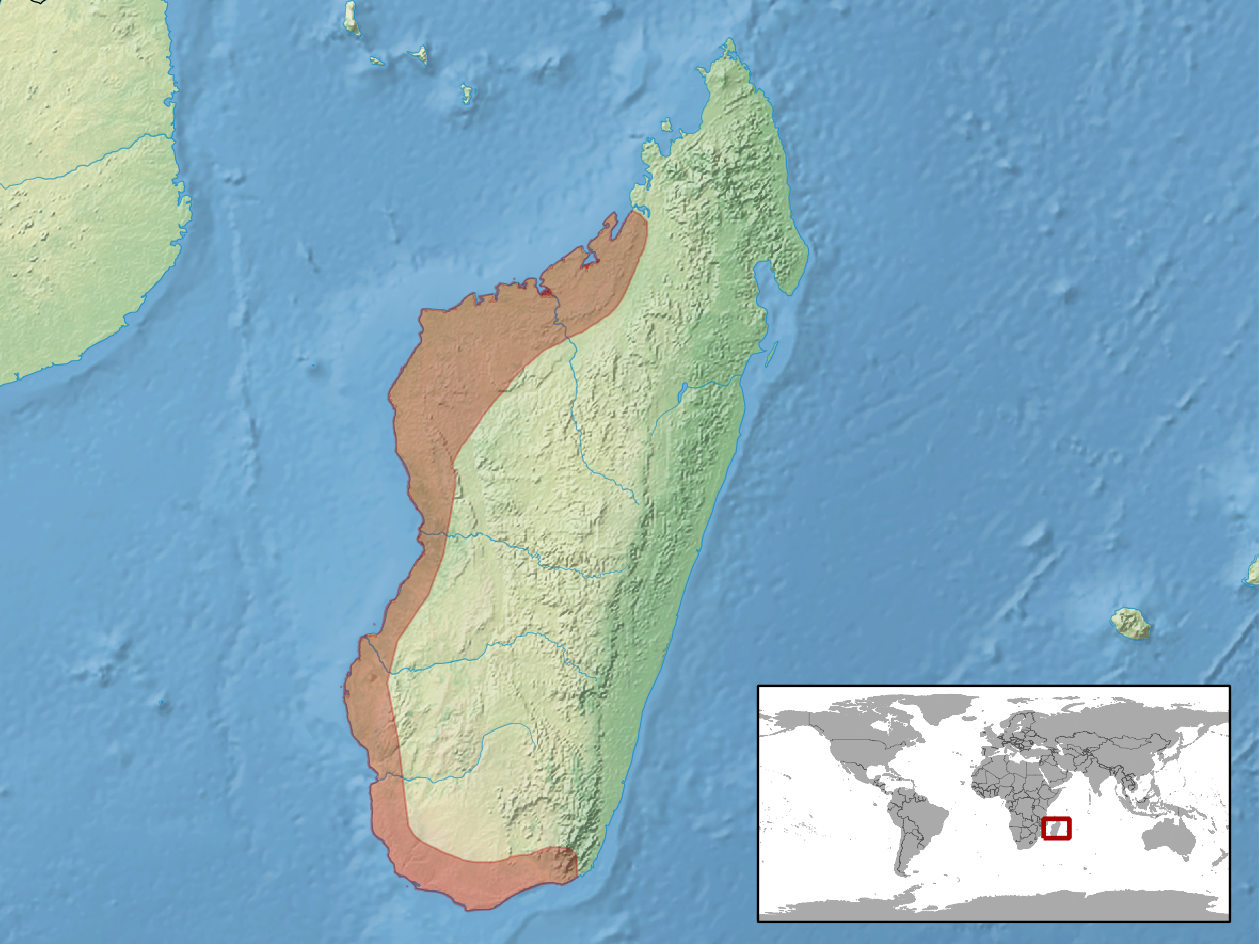

Synonyms
- Hemidactylus sakalava; Homopholis heterolepis; Homopholis sakalava

= Blaesodactylus sakalava =

Species of lizard

Blaesodactylus sakalava, the Sakalava velvet gecko is a species of gecko endemic to Madagascar.
