= Pierre Marc Gaston de Lévis, Duke of Lévis =

French politician, aphorist and soldier

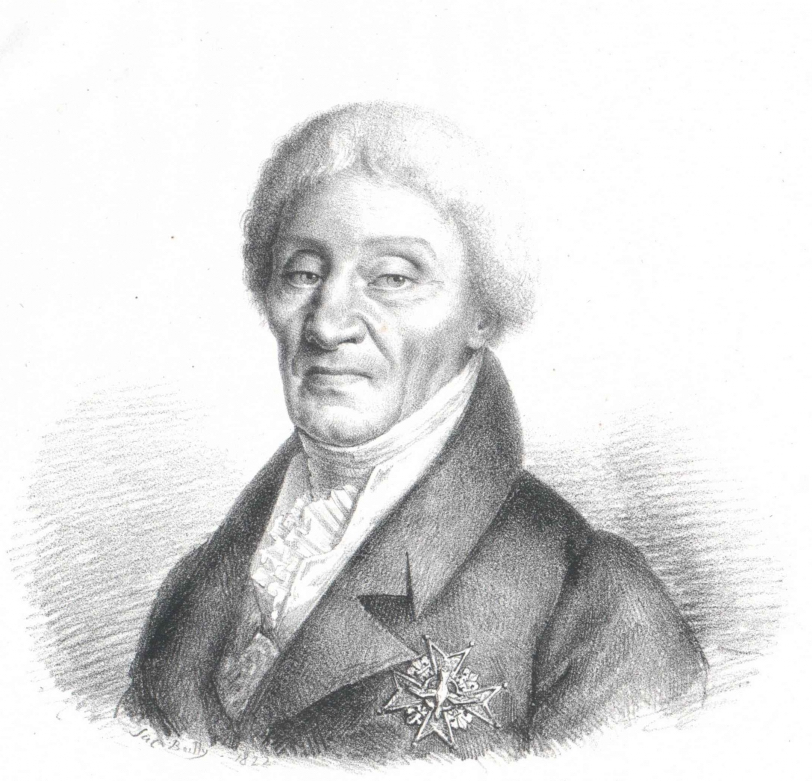
Pierre-Marc-Gaston de Lévis

Pierre-Marc-Gaston de Lévis, 2nd Duke of Lévis (1764 – 15 February 1830), peer of France, was a French politician, aphorist, and soldier. At the French Revolution he was a deputy of the National Constituent Assembly. He published several books and was a member of the Académie française.

== Birth and origins ==
Pierre Marc Gaston was born in Paris on 7 March 1764, the only son of Francis de Gaston and his wife Gabrielle Augustine Michel de Tharon.

His father was then styled chevalier de Lévis and part of the cadet Ajac branch of the House of Lévis. He had retired from the French army at the end of the Seven Years' War (1756–1763) with the rank of lieutenant-général. He was appointed governor of Artois in 1765. In 1783 he would be made marshal of France and in 1785 created the 1st Duke of Lévis.

His mother was a daughter of Gabriel Michel de Tharon, who was involved in the Nantes slave trade and director of the French East India Company 1749–1764.

== Ancien regime ==
Gaston de Lévis entered the Royal Artillery School in Douai at the age of 13, and became second lieutenant in 1779. At the age of 16, he was promoted to captain of the bodyguard of Monsieur, the Count of Provence, brother of the king, the future Louis XVIII. He was posted to Saumur and Strasbourg.

In 1782, he was promoted to captain à la suite of in the Carabiniers corps.

With Louis Doulcet de Pontécoulant, a fellow student at the Artillery School, he then went on a long six-month mission to Prussia (July 1784-January 1785). He also visited Russia and Poland.

In 1788, he was appointed colonel attached to the Maréchal de Turenne regiment.

== Estates-General ==
In January 1789, Gaston de Lévis was appointed Grand Sword Bailiff of the Bailiwick of Senlis. This pre-eminent position facilitated his election in March 1789 to the only seat reserved for the nobility to represent the Bailiwick of Senlis at the Estates-General. He was not yet 25.

He sat in the Estates-General with his cousins Marc-Antoine de Lévis and Charles Philibert Marie Gaston de Lévis, both of whom were guillotined during the Terror.

At the Estates-General, his mandate required him to vote by head, but he felt he could not join the Third Estate on 25 June 1789. He was in favour of a liberal society, referring to the English constitution. On 22 June 1791, he took the military oath. He voted against assignats and the attachment of Avignon and the Comtat Venaissin.

== Revolution and Empire ==
He emigrated after 10 August 1792, joined the army of the Princes, where he was poorly received, and eventually served as a private in an Austrian regiment.

During the revolutionary decade, the Duke and Duchess de Lévis travelled back and forth between France and England several times, either together or separately.

They appeared on the list of emigrants from 1794.

Gaston de Lévis took part in the Quiberon expedition. He arrived opposite Carnac on 25 June 1795 and landed for the first time on the 27th. He then took command of 300 royalists from Auray, landing again this time opposite Fort Penthièvre on 5 July, taking it from the Republican garrison and, as the only senior officer, taking command of around 600 men to block access to the peninsula. He was wounded in the leg on 16 July, his horse killed beneath him, and was finally able to board a British ship that took him back to Plymouth on 27 July.

He returned to France after 18 Brumaire. In 1801, he bought the château of Champs sur Marne, near Paris, which had once belonged to his mother's family. He kept it until his death, after which his children sold it.

He devoted himself to writing and stayed away from the imperial regime. A man of wit, he was appreciated by Chateaubriand.

== Restoration ==
During the first Restoration, he was made a life peer by order of 4 June 1814 and promoted to maréchal de camp in March 1815.

In the Chamber of Peers, he sat on the right, while remaining aloof from the ultras.

In the spring of 1815, he accompanied the Duchesse d'Angoulême to Bordeaux and left the city with her, before joining Louis XVIII in Ghent.

During the Second Restoration, he was made a hereditary peer by order of 19 August 1815, then a hereditary duke-peer (without majorate) by order of 31 August 1817.3 He sat in the Chamber of Peers until his death.

In 1816, he was made an honorary knight of the Duchess of Berry.

He was mayor of Champs-sur-Marne from 1826 to 1830.

== Marriage and children ==
At the age of 20, Gaston de Lévis married Pauline Charpentier d'Ennery on 13 May 1784 at the church of Saint-Eustache in Paris. Aged 13, she was the only daughter of Victor-Thérèse Charpentier, count then marquis of Ennery, marshal of the King's camps and armies, governor of Martinique and then Saint Domingue, who died in 1776, and Rose Bénédicte d'Alesso d'Éragny. At that time, she inherited all her father's property, including the Château d'Ennery (Val-d'Oise). Gaston and his wife made the Château d'Ennery [archive] their favourite residence, carrying out numerous improvements and embellishments. She died in Paris on 2 November 1829. Gaston and Pauline de Lévis had two children:

- Adèle Charlotte Augustine de Lévis (1788-1848), married in 1809 to Aymard Théodore de Nicolaÿ, comte de Nicolaÿ, peer of France from 1815 to 1830 (1782-1871), from whom descendants;
- Gaston-François Christophe de Lévis-Ajac, 3rd Duke of Lévis, then Duke of Lévis-Ventadour (1794-1863), married in Paris in 1821 Marie Catherine Amanda d'Aubusson de la Feuillade (Château de Riberpré, 4 June 1798 - Paris, 28 March 1854), daughter of Pierre Raymond Hector d'Aubusson de La Feuillade and Agathe de la Barberie de Reffuveille, no children.

== Quotations ==
He is credited with the quotation "Boredom is an illness for which work is the remedy". The quotation often attributed to Voltaire, "Judge a man by his questions rather than by his answers" is a version of one maxim by Lévis: "Il est encore plus facile de juger de l'esprit d'un homme par ses questions que par ses réponses." (It is easier to judge the mind of a man by his questions rather than his answers) from Maximes et réflexions sur différents sujets de morale et de politique (Paris, 1808): Maxim xviii. His 1808 book is also the source of the expression "noblesse oblige" (nobility obliges; privilege entails responsibility).

In 1816 he was elected to seat 6 of the Académie Française.

== Works ==
1808 : Voyage de Kang-Hi, ou nouvelles lettres chinoises, 2 vol.
1808 : Maximes et réflexions sur différents sujets
1812 : Zénéyde, a continuation for an incomplete tale by Anthony Hamilton in Œuvres du comte Antoine Hamilton, 3rd volume, Paris, Renouard, 1812 read online
1812 : Les quatre Facardins [The Four Facardins], a continuation for an incomplete tale by Anthony Hamilton in Œuvres du comte Antoine Hamilton, 3rd volume, Paris, Renouard, 1812 read online
1814 : L'Angleterre au commencement du XIXe siècle
1813 : Souvenirs et portraits 1780-1789
1816 : Considérations morales sur les finances
1818 : Des emprunts
1819 : De l'autorité des chambres sur leurs membres
1824 : Considérations sur la situation financière de la France
1828 : La conspiration de 1821 ou les jumeaux de Chevreuse, 2 vol.
1829 : Lettre sur la méthode Jacotot
