= Paul Veyne =

French historian (1930–2022)

Paul Veyne (French: [pɔl vɛn]; 13 June 1930 – 29 September 2022) was a French historian and a specialist of Ancient Rome. A student of the prestigious École Normale Supérieure (ENS Ulm) in Paris and member of the École française de Rome in the Palazzo Farnese (1955–1957), he was honorary professor at the Collège de France.

== Biography ==
Veyne was born in Aix-en-Provence. From a background which he described as "uncultured", he took up archaeology and history by chance, at the age of eight, when he discovered a piece of an amphora on a Celtic site close to the village of Cavaillon. He developed a particular interest in Roman civilization since it was the best-known in the environment in which he grew up.

The family having moved to Lille, he assiduously studied the Roman collections of the archaeological museum there, where he received guidance from the curator. He maintains that his interest in the Greeks and Romans stems not from any humanist impulse or any specific admiration, but just from his chance discovery as a child.

Having come to Paris for his khâgne, he had a sudden moment of political awakening in front of the bas-relief that celebrates the liberation of the city at the bottom of the Boulevard St. Michel and joined the Communist Party of France. He left the party four years later, without ever having had a true political conviction.

On the other hand, the bad treatment of the Algerians at the hands of the colonials revolted him in equal measure to the atrocities of the Nazis. Once again, however, his shock was neither social nor political, but moral.

Paul Veyne studied at the École Normale Supérieure in Paris 1951–55. He was a member of the École française de Rome 1955–1957, whereupon he settled in Aix-en-Provence as a professor at the University of Provence. It was in his years in Aix that he published his provocative Comment on écrit l'histoire, an essay on the epistemology of history. At a time when the dominant trend in French historiography favoured quantitative methods, Veyne's essay unabashedly declared history to be a "true tale". Through his essay, he became an early representative of the interest in the narrative aspects of scientific history.

His monograph on evergetism from 1975 (Le pain et le cirque), however, demonstrated that Veyne's concept of narrative somewhat differed from its common use and that his differences with the hegemonic Annales school was smaller than what had seemed to be the case in 1970. The book is a comprehensive study of the practice of gift-giving, in the tradition of Marcel Mauss, more in line with the anthropologically influenced histoire des mentalités of the third Annalistes generation than with "old-fashioned" narrative history.

In 1975 Veyne entered the Collège de France thanks to the support of Raymond Aron, who had been abandoned by his former heir apparent Pierre Bourdieu. However, Veyne, by failing to cite the name of Aron in his inaugural lecture, aroused his displeasure, and according to Veyne he was persecuted by Aron ever since this perceived sign of his ingratitude. Veyne remained there from 1975 to 1999 as holder of the chair of Roman history.

In 1978 Veyne's epistemological essay was reissued in tandem with a new essay on Michel Foucault as a historian: "Foucault révolutionne l'histoire." In this essay Veyne moved away from the insistence on history as narrative and focused instead on how the work of Foucault constituted a major shift in historical thinking. The essence of the Foucauldian 'revolution' was, according to Veyne, a shift of attention from 'objects' to 'practices', to highlight the way the epistemological objects were brought into being, rather than the objects themselves. With this essay, Veyne established himself as an idiosyncratic and important interpreter of his colleague. The relationship between the historian of antiquities and the philosopher also influenced Foucault's turn towards antiquity in the second volume of the History of Sexuality, as well as his reading of liberalism in his public lectures (1978–79). In 2008 Veyne published a full-length book on Foucault, reworking some of the themes from his 1978 essay, and expanding it to an intellectual portrait.

Paul Veyne lived in Bédoin, in the Vaucluse. He died there on 29 September 2022, at the age of 92.

== Honours ==
- 1990: Knight of the Legion of Honour
- 1995: Officer of the National Order of Merit (France)
- 2016: Officer of the Legion of Honour
- 2016: Commander of the Ordre des Arts et des Lettres

== Awards ==
- 1972: Prize of the Académie française
- 2006: Chateaubriand Awards
- 2007: French Senate History Book Award
- 2007: Grand prix Gobert
- 2009: Prix Roger Caillois
- 2014: Prix Femina essai
- 2017: Prize of Bibliothèque nationale de France
- 2021: French Senate Medal

== Main publications ==
=== In French ===
- Comment on écrit l'histoire : essai d'épistémologie, Paris Le Seuil, 1970.
- Le pain et le cirque, Paris, Le Seuil, 1976.
- L'inventaire des différences, Paris, Le Seuil, 1976.
- Les Grecs ont-ils cru à leurs mythes ?, Paris, Le Seuil, 1983.
- L'élégie érotique romaine, Paris, Le Seuil, 1983.
- Histoire de la vie privée, vol. I, Paris, Le Seuil, 1987.
- René Char en ses poèmes, Paris, Gallimard, 1990.
- La société romaine, Paris, Le Seuil, 1991.
- Sénèque, Entretiens, Lettres à Lucilius, revised translation, introduction and notes, Paris, Laffont, 1993.
- Le quotidien et l'intéressant, conversations with Catherine Darbo-Peschanski, Paris, Hachette, 1995.
- Les mystères du gynécée, in collaboration with F. Frontisi-Ducroux and F. Lissarrague, Paris, Gallimard, 1998.
- Sexe et pouvoir à Rome, Paris, Tallandier, 2005.
- L'empire gréco-romain, Paris, Le Seuil, 2005.
- Quand notre monde est devenu chrétien , Paris, Albin Michel, 2007
- Foucault, sa pensée, sa personne, Paris, Albin Michel, 2008.
- Mon musée imaginaire, ou les chefs-d'œuvre de la peinture italienne, Paris, Albin Michel, Beaux livres, 2010.
- Et dans l'éternité je ne m'ennuierai pas, Paris, Albin Michel, 2014.
- Palmyre. L'irremplaçable trésor, Paris, Albin Michel, 2015
- La Villa des Mystères à Pompéi, Paris, Gallimard, coll. « Art et Artistes », 2016.
- Une insolite curiosité, Paris, Robert Laffont, coll. « Bouquins », 2020.

=== In English ===
- Writing History: Essay on Epistemology, Oxford, The Wesleyan Edition, 1984
- History of Private Life: From Pagan Rome to Byzantium, Harvard, Harvard University Press, 1987
- Did the Greeks Believe in Their Myths?: An Essay on the Constitutive Imagination, Chicago, University of Chicago Press, 1988
- Bread and Circuses: Historical Sociology and Political Pluralism, London, Penguin Books, 1992
- The Roman Empire, Harvard, The Belknap Press, 1997
- Foucault: His Thought, His Character, Cambridge, Polity Press, 2003
- When Our World Became Christian: 312 - 394, Cambridge, Polity Press, 2010
- Palmyra: An Irreplaceable Treasure, Chicago, University of Chicago Press, 2017
