= Boulanger =

Boulanger (pronounced [bulɑ̃ʒe]) is a typical French and Francophone surname, equivalent of the English Baker, the Italian Panettiere, etc.

It is shared by several notable persons:

- André Boulanger (1886–1958), French professor of literature and Latin scholar
- Daniel Boulanger (1922–2014), French novelist, playwright, poet and screenwriter
- Ernest Boulanger (composer) (1815–1900), French composer and conductor, father of Nadia and Lili
- Ernest Boulanger (politician) (1831–1907), French politician and economist
- Georges Ernest Boulanger (1837–1891), French general and politician
- Georges Boulanger (violinist) (1893–1958), Romanian violinist, conductor and composer
- Graciela Rodo Boulanger (born 1935), Bolivian painter
- Gustave Boulanger (1824–1888), French painter
- Lili Boulanger (1893–1918), French composer, Nadia's sister
- Louis Boulanger (1806–1867), French Romantic painter, pastellist, lithographer and poet
- Mike Boulanger (born 1949), American baseball coach
- Mousse Boulanger (1926–2023), Swiss poet and actress
- Nadia Boulanger (1887–1979), French composer, Lili's sister
- Nicolas Antoine Boulanger (1722–1759), French writer of the Age of Enlightenment
- Pierre Boulanger (born 1987), French actor
- Pierre-Jules Boulanger (1885–1950), French engineer and businessman
- Richard Boulanger (born 1956), American composer and professor

== See also ==
- Boulenger
- Boulangerite, mineral
- Bolinger
- Bollinger
