= André Boullanger =

French Augustine monk and preacher (1578–1657)

Father André Boullanger
- Title: Provincial

Personal life
- Born: 1578 Paris, France
- Died: 27 September 1657 (aged 78–79) Paris, France

Religious life
- Religion: Roman Catholic

André Boullanger (1578–1657), more commonly known as petit Père André ("little Father André"), was a French Roman Catholic monk and preacher of the reformed order of Augustines.

== Life ==
André Boullanger was born at Paris in 1578. He was the son of a President of the Parlement (High Court) of Paris. At an early age he entered the Augustinian Order and became a well-known preacher, being heard for over half a century in most of the great pulpits of France. He preached for fifty-five years and gained a wide reputation. His singularity consisted in a habit of interspersing his sermons with a few droll expressions, in order, as he said, to keep his hearers awake. He died at Paris on 27 September 1657.

== Works ==
Boulanger lived at a period when the jocose style of preaching, introduced by such men as Menot and Maillard, still lingered, and he made large use of the burlesque in his own preaching. It is indeed this habit of jesting that has preserved his name. Boileau refers to Boulanger when, speaking of trivial plays on words and witticisms, he writes:

L'avocat au palais en hérissa son style,
Et le docteur en chaire en sema l'Evangile.

Translation:

The style of the advocate in court bristles with them
and the doctor in the pulpit scatters them through the Gospel.

The 1913 Catholic Encyclopedia describes André's style of preaching as eloquent but sometimes exaggerated. Tallemant des Réaux said: "He was a good member of his order and had a large following of all sorts of people; some came to laugh, others came because he moved them." The critic Guéret, who had head the facetious monk, represents him, in a dialogue of the dead, as saying in his own defence against his accuser Cardinal du Perron: "Joker as you take him to be, he has not always made those laugh who heard him; he has said truths which have sent bishops back into their dioceses. He has found the art of stinging while laughing." The Regent Anne of Austria and the Prince of Condé enjoyed his sermons. Boulanger was several times provincial of his order and much occupied in other ways; consequently he was not able to attend to the printing of his works. Many of his manuscripts entered the convent of Queen Margaret, but the following funeral oration for Marie of Lorraine was published: Oraison Funebre de Marie' de Lorraine, Abbesse de Chelles (Paris, 1627). (Note: or: L'Oraison de Marie de Lorraine, abbesse de Chelles.)

== Sources ==
- Guéret, Gabriel (1671). La guerre des auteurs anciens et modernes. Paris: Theodore Girard. p. 152.
- Jacquinet, P. (1885). Des Prédicateurs du XVII^{e} siècle avant Bossuet. 2nd ed. Paris: V^{ve} Eugène Belin et Fils. pp. 304–306.
- McClintock, John; Strong, James, eds. (1885). "Boullanger, Andre". Cyclopædia of Biblical, Theological and Ecclesiastical Literature. Supplement 1. New York: Harper & Brothers. p. 580.
- Réaux, Gédéon Tallemant des (1834). Les historiettes de Tallemant des Réaux: mémoires pour servir à l'histoire du XVII^{e} siècle. Vol. 3. Paris: Alphonse Levavasseur. pp. 321–332.
