= Epidoseis =

Epidoseis (Ancient Greek: ἐπιδόσεις) was a form of non-compulsory, non-tax financial giving in ancient Greece.

An epidoseis was a voluntary contribution, either in money, arms, or ships, which was made by a citizen of Athens in order to meet the extraordinary demands of the state. When the expenses of the state were greater than its revenue, it was usual for the prytaneis to summon an assembly of the people -- ecclesia -- and, after explaining the necessities of the state, to call upon the citizens to contribute according to their means.

Those who were willing to contribute then rose and said what they would give; while those who were unwilling to give anything, remained silent or retired privately from the assembly. The names of those who had promised to contribute, together with the amount of their contributions, were written on tablets, which were placed before the statues of the Eponymi, where they remained until the amount was paid.

These voluntary contributions were frequently very large. Sometimes the more wealthy citizens voluntarily undertook a "trierarchy", or the expenses of equipping a trireme. We read that the freedman Pasion furnished 1000 shields, together with five triremes, which he equipped at his own expense. Chrysippus presented a talent to the state, when Alexander the Great moved against Thebes during the Battle of Thebes; Aristophanes, son of Nicophemus, gave 30,000 drachmae for an expedition against Cyprus; Charidemus and Diotimus, two commanders, made a free gift of 800 shields; and similar instances of liberality are mentioned by German classical scholar August Böckh, from whom the preceding examples have been taken.
