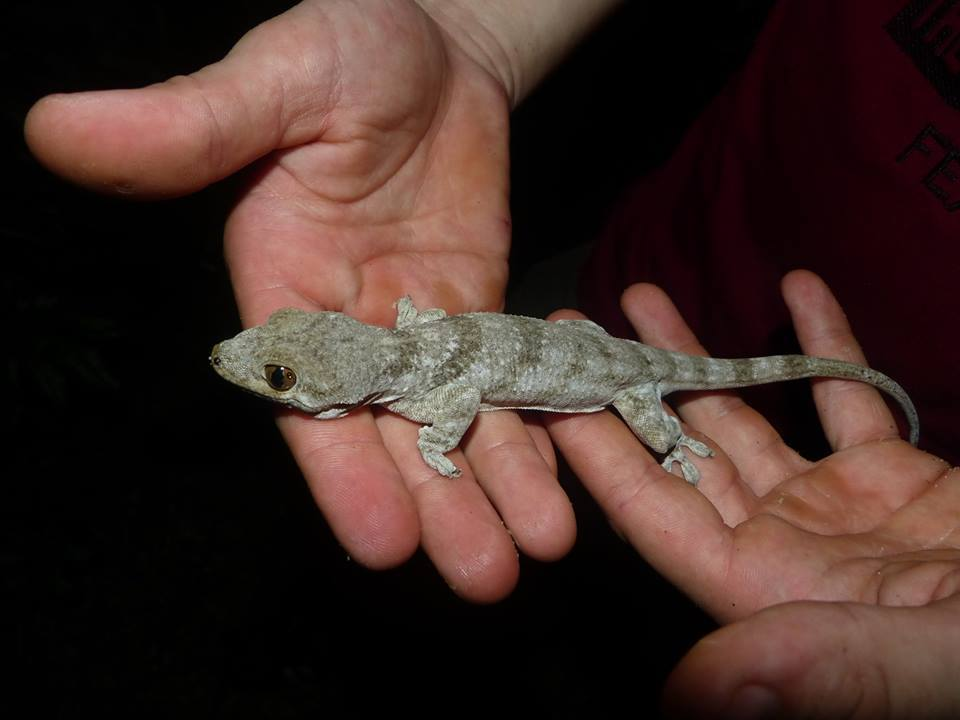

Conservation status
- Vulnerable (IUCN 3.1)

Scientific classification
- Kingdom: Animalia
- Phylum: Chordata
- Class: Reptilia
- Order: Squamata
- Suborder: Gekkota
- Family: Gekkonidae
- Genus: Blaesodactylus
- Species: B. boivini

Binomial name
- Blaesodactylus boivini (A.H.A. Duméril, 1856)
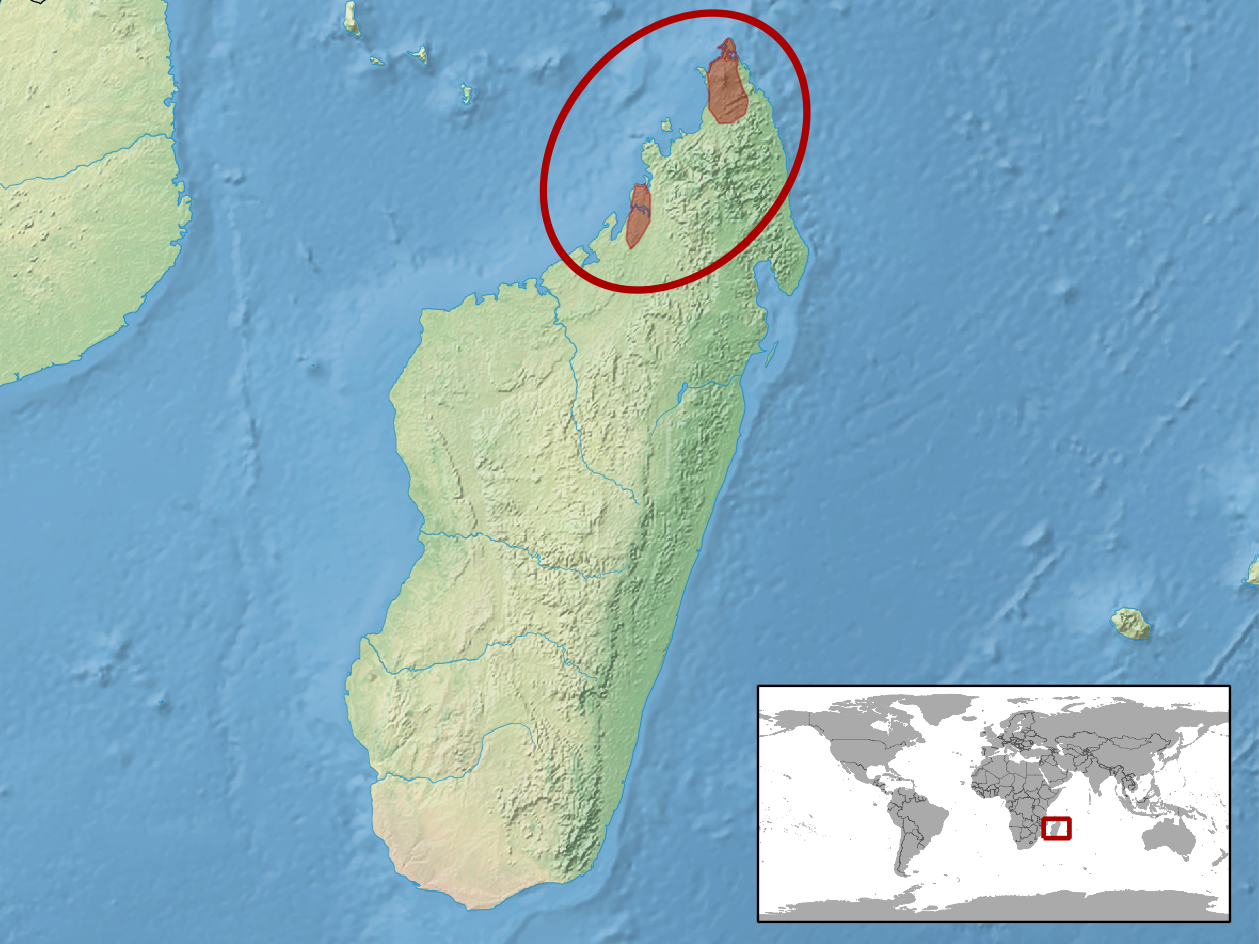

Synonyms
- Platydactylus boivini A.H.A. Duméril, 1856; Blaesodactylus boivini — Mocquard, 1895; Homopholis boivini — Kluge, 1993; Blaesodactylus boivini — Kluge & Nussbaum, 1995

= Blaesodactylus boivini =

Species of lizard

Blaesodactylus boivini is a species of gecko, a lizard in the family Gekkonidae. The species is endemic to Madagascar.

== Etymology ==
The specific name, boivini, is in honor of French botanist Louis Hyacinthe Boivin.

== Geographic range ==
B. boivini is found in northern Madagascar.

== Habitat ==
The preferred natural habitat of B. boivini is forest, at altitudes from sea level to 563 m (1,847 ft).

== Reproduction ==
B. boivini is oviparous.
