= Blaesodactylus ambonihazo =

Conservation status
- Data Deficient (IUCN 3.1)

Scientific classification
- Kingdom: Animalia
- Phylum: Chordata
- Class: Reptilia
- Order: Squamata
- Suborder: Gekkota
- Family: Gekkonidae
- Genus: Blaesodactylus
- Species: B. ambonihazo

Binomial name
- Blaesodactylus ambonihazo Bauer, Glaw, Gehring, & Vences, 2011
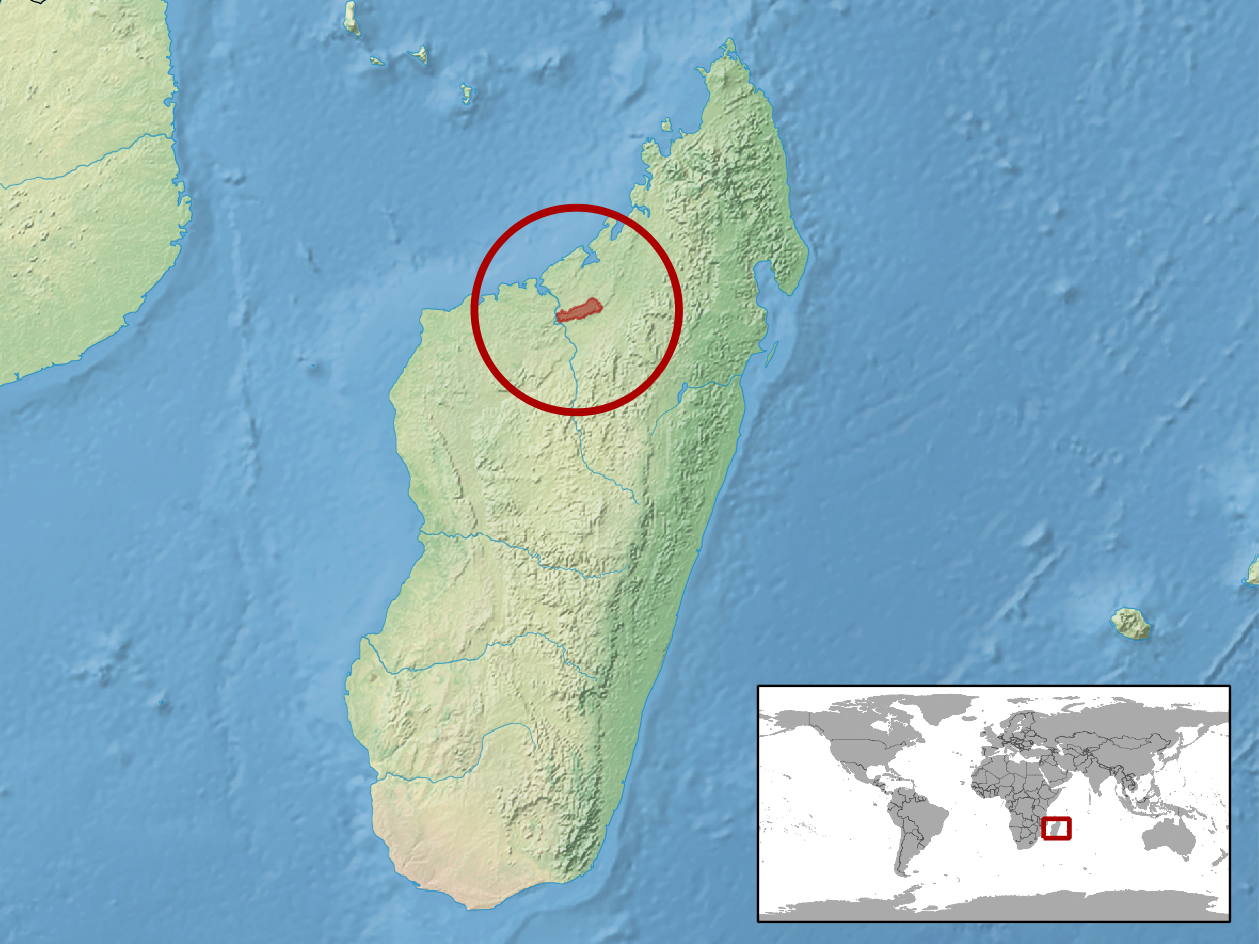

Species of lizard

Blaesodactylus ambonihazo is a species of gecko endemic to Madagascar.
