= Muller's velvet gecko =

Homopholis mulleri

Conservation status
- Near Threatened (IUCN 3.1)

Scientific classification
- Kingdom: Animalia
- Phylum: Chordata
- Class: Reptilia
- Order: Squamata
- Suborder: Gekkota
- Family: Gekkonidae
- Genus: Homopholis
- Species: H. mulleri

Binomial name
- Homopholis mulleri Visser, 1987

Synonyms
- Homopholis mulleri Visser, 1987; Platypholis mulleri — Kluge, 1993; Homopholis mulleri — Kluge & Nussbaum, 1995

Species of lizard

Muller's velvet gecko (Homopholis mulleri) is a species of lizard in the family Gekkonidae. The species is endemic to South Africa.

== Etymology ==
The specific name, mulleri, is in honor of South African amateur herpetologist Douglas Muller.

== Geographic distribution ==
Homopholis mulleri is found in the province of Limpopo, South Africa.

== Habitat ==
The preferred natural habitat of Homopholis mulleri is open veld, where it shelters in holes and under the loose bark of trees such as Sclerocarya birrea and Senegalia nigrescens.

== Description ==
Dorsally, Homopholis mulleri is light brown to dark gray, with darker and lighter markings. Ventrally, it is white.

Females may attain a snout-to-vent length (SVL) of 8.1 cm (3.2 in). Males are smaller, attaining 7.1 cm (2.8 in) SVL.

== Reproduction ==
Homopholis mulleri is oviparous.
