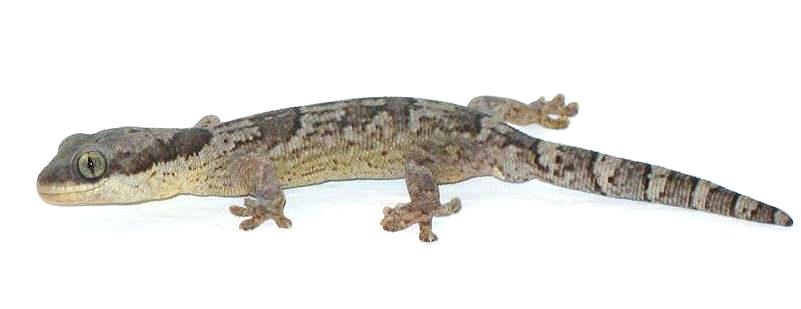

Conservation status
- Least Concern (IUCN 3.1)

Scientific classification
- Kingdom: Animalia
- Phylum: Chordata
- Class: Reptilia
- Order: Squamata
- Suborder: Gekkota
- Family: Gekkonidae
- Genus: Homopholis
- Species: H. fasciata

Binomial name
- Homopholis fasciata Boulenger, 1890

Synonyms
- Platypholis fasciata; Homopholis erlangeri

= Homopholis fasciata =

Species of lizard

Homopholis fasciata, a nocturnal vertebrate known as the banded velvet gecko or striped velvet gecko, is a small gecko that lives in East Africa.

== Description ==
Homopholis fasciata are small geckos with soft, velvet-like skin. They have short, rounded heads and long, thin non-tapering tails. Their body shape is stout with a bunt and toes that have both adhesive pads and claws. Their skin ranges from green, greys and browns with a chevron-like pattern down the back. They grow to 3½"–4½" and are known to bite. They are very common in both urban and rural areas and although they can bite they rarely ever do as their main defence is to play dead rather than to defend or attack. Although not known how long this gecko can play dead for it is not uncommon for them to be motionless for two to three days whilst they still feel under threat. The gecko is prey to snakes but in urban areas domestic cats attack and kill these lovely little reptiles that can be seen often scaling walls and running around gardens during the day. This gecko does not mind daylight but does hide in shaded places during midday when the sun is at its highest.

== Distribution and habitat ==
Homopholis fasciata occur in East Africa, in Somalia, Ethiopia, Kenya, and Tanzania. They inhabit wet or dry savannas containing large trees. They can be found hiding under the bark and in the crevasses of these trees. Mostly nocturnal but may also be found active during the day.

== In captivity ==
=== Captive environment ===
In captivity, they require many hiding spots and 80–90 °F heating by means of a heat mat. The optimal temperature should be 75° to 82 °F daytime with a 5° to 10 °F drop at night. A daytime hot spot is beneficial; using a 10 or 20 watt halogen light works well. These geckos requires moderate to high humidity, 60 to 80%, with a gradient between one side of the enclosure and the other. This can be accomplished well by keeping the side where the water dish is located a bit cooler and spraying that area down daily. As for lighting, use plant grow lights on a timer to simulate the tropics, 12 hours on, 12 hours off. Seasonal day length fluctuations are not needed but could help to stimulate breeding. A dim night light is required for viewing nocturnal activities. A 10-gallon will work for a pair but a taller tank would be better. Set it up as forest habitat with climbing branches, sturdy plants, hiding places and a warm area or basking spot.

=== Feeding ===
Small crickets are the main staple diet along with small mealworms and various other insects when available. Excess calcium causes their neck pouches to puff out.

=== Husbandry ===
In terms of mating, males have hemipenal bulges at the base of the tail. Males also have a pair of pre-anal pores/scales just above the cloacal opening that the females lack. Egg laying may occur during the winter in the Northern Hemisphere. 4 or 5 clutches of 2 eggs each may be laid during the breeding period. The hard-shelled eggs are laid under loose bark, in crevasses or buried in a slightly moist spot. They should be removed for incubation at around 82 °F.
