= Noblesse oblige =

Concept that nobility confers social responsibilities

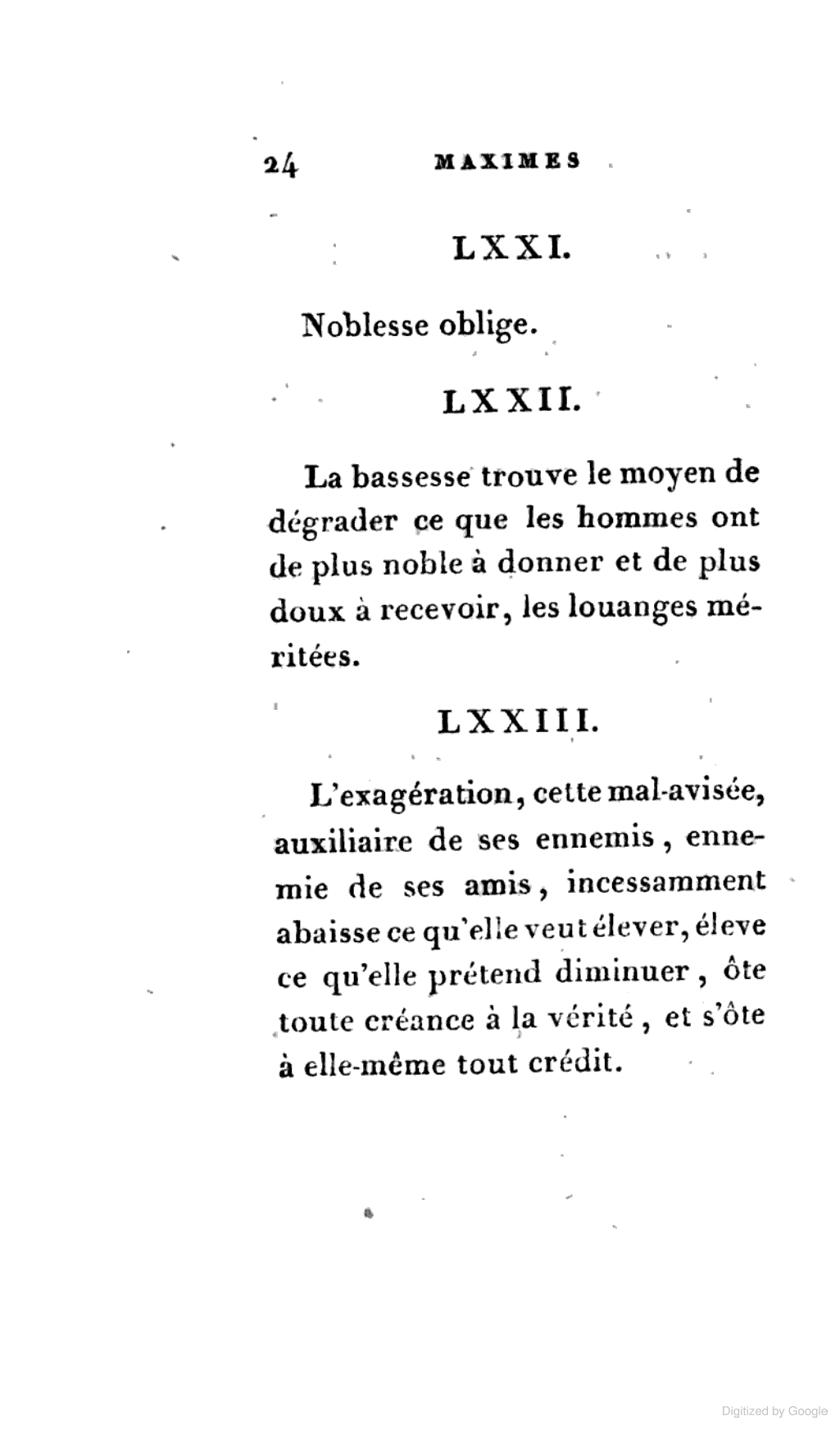
The page from Maxims (1808) by Pierre Marc Gaston de Lévis that originated the phrase.

Noblesse oblige (French: [nɔblɛs ɔbliʒ]; lit. 'nobility obliges') is a French expression that means that nobility extends beyond mere entitlement, requiring people who hold such status to fulfill social responsibilities; the term retains the same meaning in English. For example, a primary obligation of a nobleman could include generosity towards those around him. As those who lived on the nobles' land had obligations to the nobility, the nobility had obligations to their people, including protection at the least.

According to the Oxford English Dictionary, the term suggests "noble ancestry constrains to honourable behaviour; privilege entails responsibility." The Dictionnaire de l'Académie française defines it thus:

1. Whoever claims to be noble must conduct himself nobly.
2. (Figuratively) One must act in a fashion that conforms to one's position and privileges with which one has been born, bestowed and/or has earned.

OED and others cite the source of the phrase as Maxims (1808) by Pierre Marc Gaston de Lévis, Duke of Lévis.

== Meaning and variants ==
Noblesse oblige is generally used to imply that wealth, power, and prestige come with responsibilities. In ethical discussion, the term is sometimes used to summarize a moral economy wherein privilege must be balanced by duty towards those who lack such privilege or who cannot perform such duty. Recently, it has been used to refer to public responsibilities of the rich, famous and powerful, notably to provide good examples of behaviour or exceed minimal standards of decency. It has also been used to describe a person taking the blame for something in order to solve an issue or save someone else.

== History and examples ==
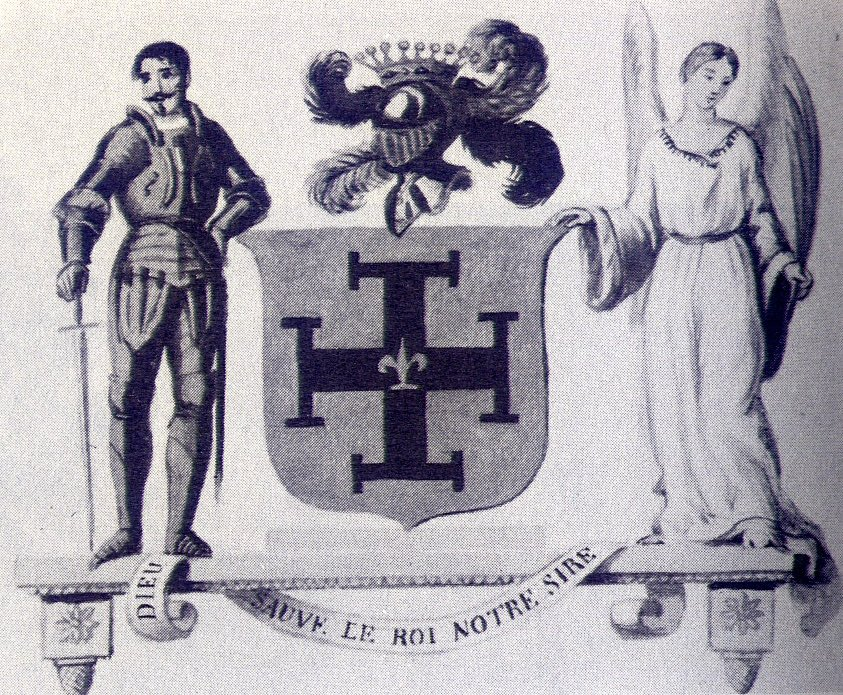
Figurative armories of "de Mortsauf" in Le lys dans la Vallée by Honoré de Balzac

An early instance of this concept in literature may be found in Homer's Iliad. In Book XII, the hero Sarpedon delivers a speech in which he urges his comrade Glaucus to fight with him in the front ranks of battle. In Pope's translation, Sarpedon exhorts Glaucus thus:

'Tis ours, the dignity they give to grace
The first in valour, as the first in place;
That when with wondering eyes our confidential bands
Behold our deeds transcending our commands,
Such, they may cry, deserve the sovereign state,
Whom those that envy dare not imitate!

In Luke 12:48, Jesus says: "Everyone to whom much was given, of him much will be required, and from him to whom they entrusted much, they will demand the more."

During the Hellenistic period, a similar practice of benevolence and benefaction in funding public institutions and distributing wealth, known as euergetism, used private, focused urbanization and investment to engineer a reciprocal relationship predicated on tradition and established societal norms. These customs bounded the civic elite to economic intervention through these social expectations and the populace to loyalty in subordinating them to dependents sustaining themselves through philanthropy.

On a larger scale, this mutual interdependence can be observed in the symbiotic relationship between a tributary state and its overlord: Alexander the Great formalized this policy in seeking to portray his conquests and subjugations as a form of liberation by directing funding into recently acquired polities.

Similarly, patron-client relationships in ancient Roman society and the mutual paternalistic obligations the patrician class maintained towards plebeians existed for a similar purpose: to reinforce traditional social hierarchies and imbue loyalty. Within the Roman colonies, a similar expectation existed surrounding the collective maintenance of the outpost by its Roman inhabitants.

In Le Lys dans la Vallée, written in 1835 and published in 1836, Honoré de Balzac recommends certain standards of behaviour to a young man, concluding: "Everything I have just told you can be summarized by an old word: noblesse oblige!" His advice included "others will respect you for detesting people who have done detestable things."

The phrase is carved into Bertram Goodhue's Los Angeles Public Library on a sculpture by Lee Lawrie as part of Hartley Burr Alexander's iconographic scheme for the building.

In the song "The Life I Lead" from the 1964 Disney film Mary Poppins, the character Mr. Banks (played by David Tomlinson) uses the phrase: "I'm the lord of my castle! The sovereign! The liege! I treat my subjects, servants, children, wife, with a firm but gentle hand—noblesse oblige."

== See also ==
- Chivalry
- Euergetism
- Golden Rule
- Honour
- High Tory
- "The Gospel of Wealth"
- Liturgy (ancient Greece)
- Mandate of Heaven
- Might makes right
- National Honor Society (USA)
- Paternalistic conservatism
- "The White Man's Burden"
- "With great power comes great responsibility"
