= André Boulanger =

French academic (1886–1958)

André Boulanger (26 July 1886, Chéroy – 9 September 1958, Montgeron) was a French professor of literature and Latin scholar who shared his activity between archaeology and the teaching profession.

He was a professor of Latin language and literature at Fribourg, Bordeaux, Strasbourg, and at the Sorbonne.

The subject of his thesis was Aelius Aristides and sophistry in the province of Asia in the second century AD. He was responsible for the creation of the neologism euergetism (from the Greek εὐεργετέω meaning "I do good things") for the practice of wealthy or high-status individuals distributing a part of their wealth to the community, rather than to individuals.
