= Bolinger =

Bolinger is a surname. Notable people with the surname include:

- Bo Bolinger (1932–2011), American football player
- Brian Bolinger, American football official
- Dwight Bolinger (1907–1992), American linguist
- Russ Bolinger (born 1954), American football player, actor, broadcaster, and scout
- Joshua Bolinger (born 1992), American scientist and musician

== See also ==
- Bollinger
- Boulanger
