= Ajac =

Commune in Occitanie, France

- Commune
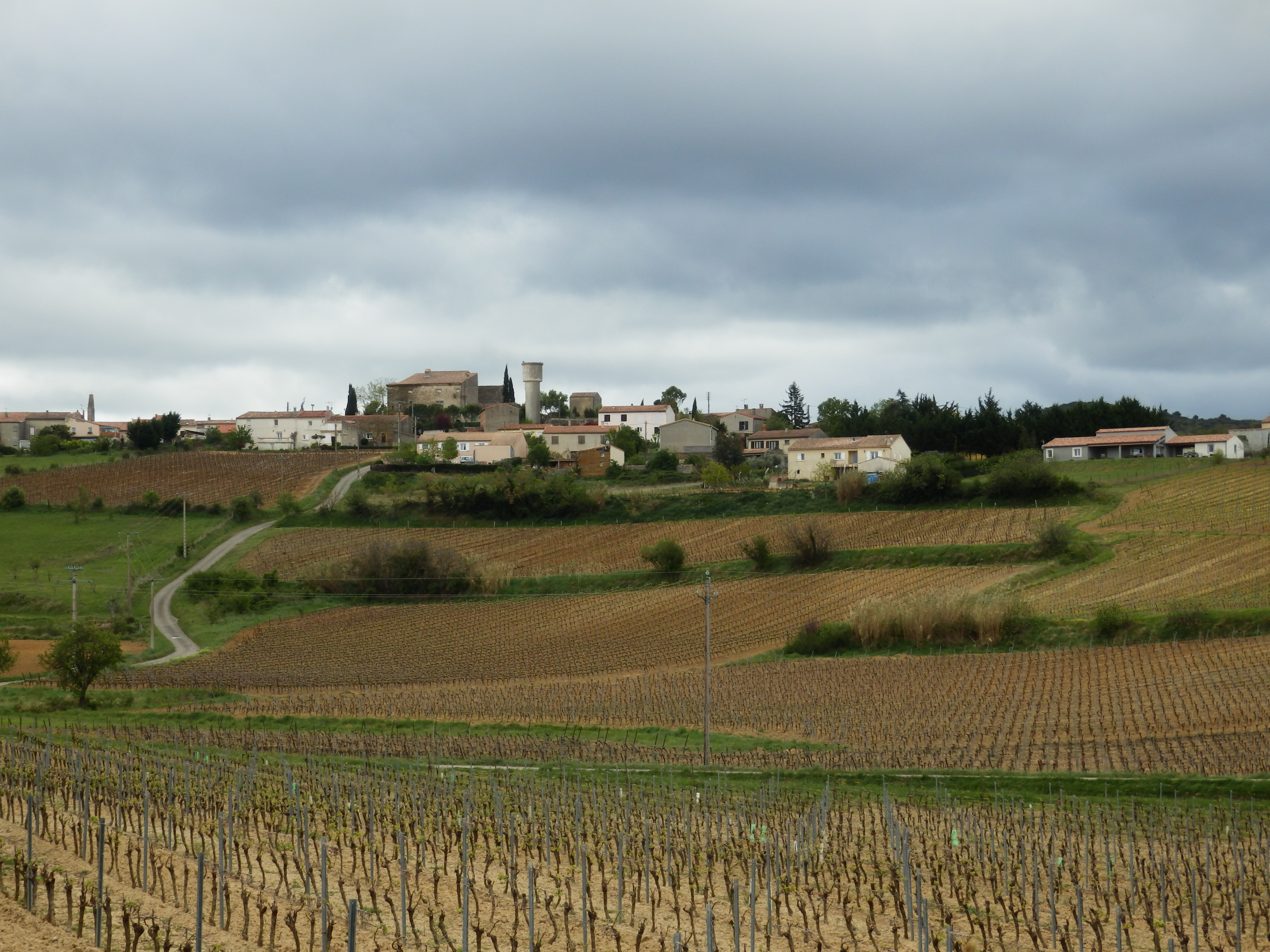
- A general view of Ajac

- Coat of arms
- Location of Ajac
- Location within France Location within Occitanie
- Coordinates: 43°02′55″N 2°08′17″E
- Country: France
- Region: Occitania
- Department: Aude
- Arrondissement: Limoux
- Canton: La Région Limouxine
- Intercommunality: Limouxin

Government
  - Mayor (2020–2026): Gérard Chaumond
- Area^{1}: 5.29 km^{2} (2.04 sq mi)
- Elevation: 240 m (790 ft)
- Highest elevation: 401 m (1,316 ft)
- Lowest elevation: 226 m (741 ft)
- Population (2023): 196
  - Density: 37.1/km^{2} (96.0/sq mi)
- Time zone: UTC+01:00 (CET)
  - Summer (DST): UTC+02:00 (CEST)
- INSEE/Postal code: 11003 /11300
- ^{1} French Land Register data, which excludes lakes, ponds, glaciers > 1 km^{2} (0.386 sq mi or 247 acres) and river estuaries.

Ajac (French pronunciation: [aʒak]) is a commune in the Aude department, part of the Occitanie region, southern France.

== Location ==
Ajac is 7 km from the local market town of Limoux, and 30 km from the historic city of Carcassonne. Falling within the ancient region of Languedoc, Ajac is part of the Pays Cathare, an area rich with Medieval abbeys and castles.

== Village Layout ==
Although not a Circulade like neighboring villages, Ajac is built upon a hill with the chateau at the top and center. The chateau was the ancestral home of the noble Montcalm and Lévis families, and birthplace of François Gaston de Lévis, Duc de Levis. Building of the chateau started in the 12th century, but has since had numerous alterations, most notably in the 18th century. It is now in private ownership.

The church of Ajac is of Romanesque origin, but rebuilt in the 18th century.

Sited within the foothills of the Eastern Pyrenees, the village is largely surrounded by agricultural land and vineyards. Both red and white wine grapes are grown locally, most notably for the production of Blanquette de Limoux, claimed by some to predate champagne.

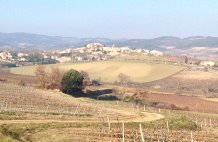
Village of Ajac

== History ==
The village of Ajac was given the name of the local count.

The local duke who was accused and hunted by the locals for accused treason against the king went into hiding. And the duke went into hiding. The duke was allowed to return on the condition that his authority not be passed on following his death. Therefore, Ajac remained independent until the French revolution and the establishment of the republic.

== Administration ==
The current mayor of Ajac is Gérard Chaumond, reelected in 2020.

== Population ==
Historical population
Year	Pop.	±% p.a.
1968	219	—
1975	226	+0.45%
1982	217	−0.58%
1990	209	−0.47%
1999	196	−0.71%
2007	244	+2.78%
2012	196	−4.29%
2017	187	−0.94%
2023	196	+0.79%
Source: INSEE

== Personalities ==
- François Gaston de Lévis

== See also ==
- Communes of the Aude department
