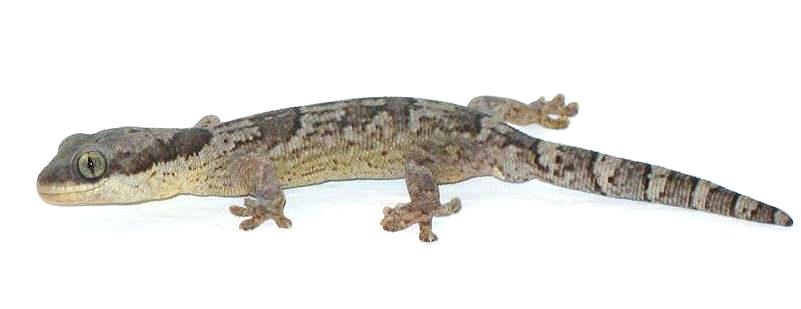
- Homopholis fasciata

Scientific classification
- Kingdom: Animalia
- Phylum: Chordata
- Class: Reptilia
- Order: Squamata
- Suborder: Gekkota
- Family: Gekkonidae
- Subfamily: Uroplatinae
- Genus: Homopholis; Boulenger, 1885

Diversity
- Four species (see text)

= Homopholis =

Genus of lizards

Homopholis is a genus of geckos in the family Gekkonidae. Species in the genus Homopholis are native to Sub-Saharan Africa. Their diet consists of small insects, and they are oviparous.

== Species ==
There are four species in the genus Homopholis.

- Homopholis arnoldi Loveridge, 1944
- Homopholis fasciata (Boulenger, 1890) – banded velvet gecko, striped velvet gecko
- Homopholis mulleri Visser, 1987 – Muller's velvet gecko
- Homopholis wahlbergii (A. Smith, 1849) – Wahlberg's velvet gecko

Nota bene: A binomial authority in parentheses indicates that the species was originally described in a genus other than Homopholis.

Nomenclatural note: The spelling walbergii was corrected to wahlbergii by Andrew Smith (1849) in an errata within an addenda slip (unpaginated).
