= François Gaston de Lévis =

French Royal Army officer (1719–1787)

- 1st Duke of Lévis
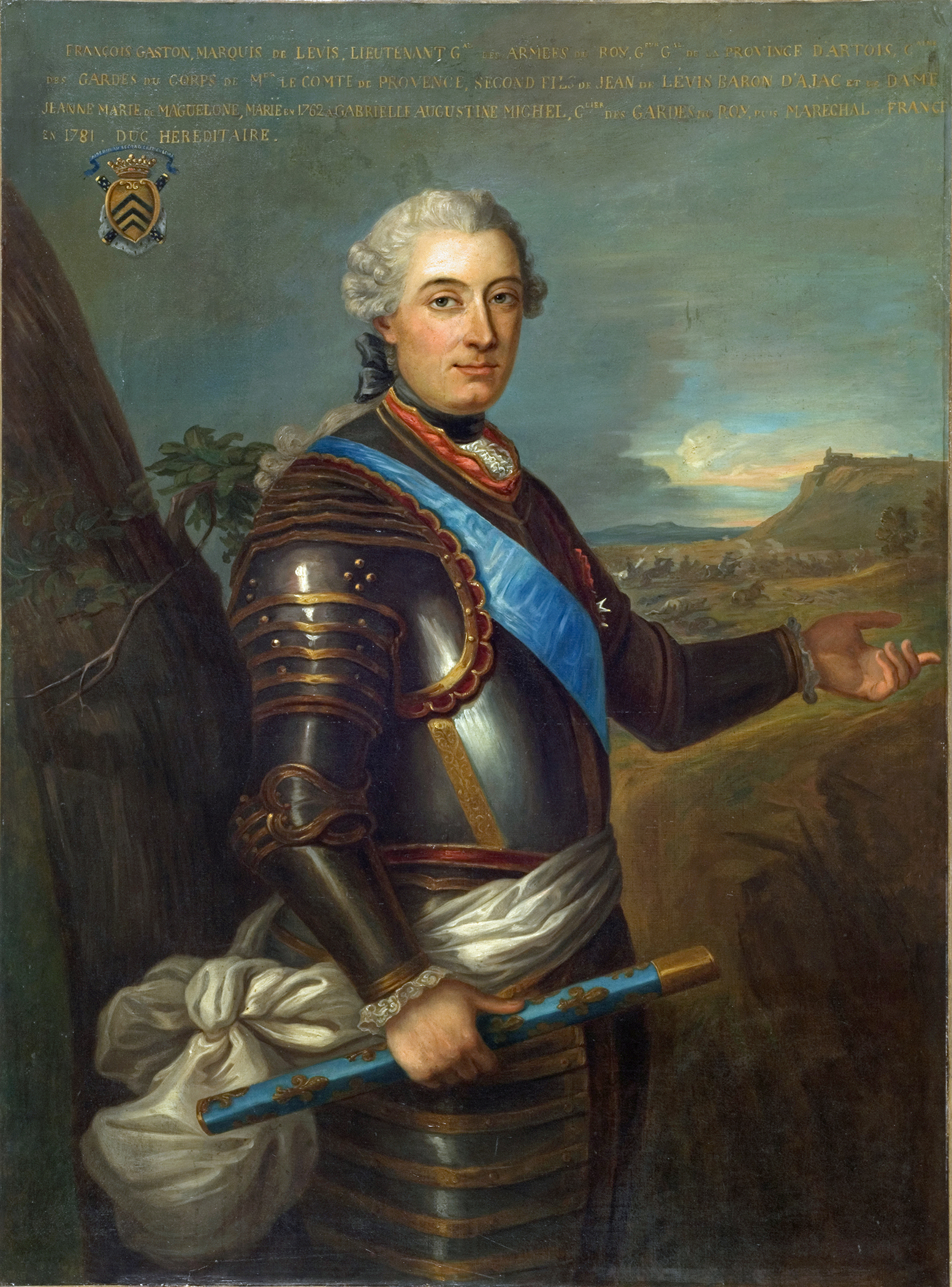
- Portrait of Lévis
- Born: 20 August 1719; Ajac, Languedoc, Kingdom of France
- Died: 26 November 1787 (aged 68); Arras, France
- Spouse: Gabrielle Augustine Michel
- Issue: Augustine Gabrielle Françoise de Lévis; Pierre-Marc-Gaston de Lévis, Duke of Lévis; Marie Gabrielle de Lévis; Henriette Françoise de Lévis
- Father: Jean de Lévis, Seigneur of Ajac
- Mother: Joan of Maguelonne
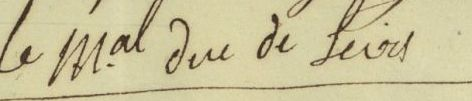
- Signature
- Occupation: Soldier
- Military career
- Allegiance: France
- Branch: French Royal Army
- Service years: 1735–1787
- Rank: Marshal of France
- Unit: Marine Regiment
- Commands: Commander-in-chief, New France
- Conflicts: War of the Polish Succession; War of the Austrian Succession; Siege of Prague; Battle of Dettingen; Seven Years' War; Battle of Fort William Henry; Battle of Carillon; Battle of Beauport; Battle of Sainte-Foy; Siege of Quebec; Montreal Campaign; Battle of Nauheim
- Awards: Knight of the Order of the Holy Spirit; Knight of the Royal and Military Order of Saint Louis; Knight of the Royal, Military, and Hospitaller Orders of Saint Lazarus of Jerusalem

François-Gaston de Lévis, 1st Duke of Lévis (20 August 1719 – 20 November 1787), styled as the Chevalier de Lévis until 1785, was a French Royal Army officer. He served with distinction in the War of the Polish Succession and the War of the Austrian Succession. During the Seven Years' War, he was second-in-command to Louis-Joseph de Montcalm in the defense of New France and then, after the surrender of New France in 1760, he served in Europe. After the war, he was appointed Governor of Artois, and in 1783 he was made a Marshal of France.

== North American military service ==
In 1756, the Marquis de Vaudreuil was informed that King Louis XV was sending the Marquis Louis-Joseph de Montcalm to take over French forces in North America, with Lévis as second in command. Vaudreuil wrote back that there was no need to send another general, as Vaudreuil disliked the tactics of most "municipal" French generals. When Montcalm arrived despite Vaudreuil's protest, the two men developed a dislike for each other.

Lévis led the vanguard of the French expedition to Fort William Henry in 1757, and laid siege to it until Montcalm's arrival.

During French planning for the 1758 campaign in the French and Indian War the disputes between Vaudreuil and Montcalm continued. Vaudreuil prevailed, and Montcalm was sent to Fort Carillon to defend it against an expected British attack. Lévis was initially slated to lead an expedition to the western forts, leading about 500 French metropolitan troops and a large seasoned French-Canadian militia. Vaudreuil, however, had second thoughts, and dispatched Lévis and his metropolitan troops to support Montcalm at Carillon. Lévis arrived at Carillon on the evening of July 7, as a British army led by James Abercrombie was arriving before the fort. In the ensuing Battle of Carillon, Abercrombie's troops were defeated, with Lévis leading the defense on the French right flank.

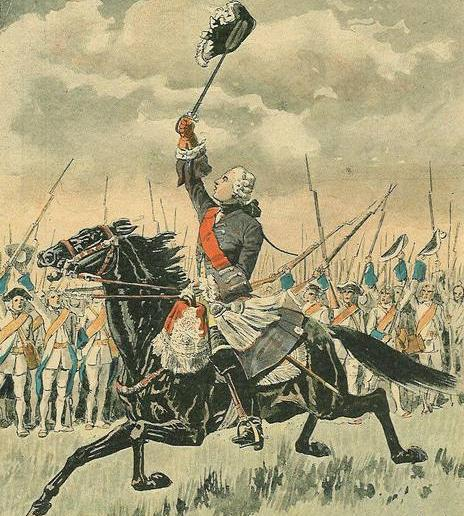
General Lévis encouraging his French army at the battle of Sainte-Foy

When the forces of James Murray arrived to begin the Siege of Quebec, Lévis participated in the early defenses, including the Battle of Beauport. He was then sent to organize the defense of Montreal, and so was not present when Quebec fell. Following Montcalm's death in the Battle of the Plains of Abraham, Lévis was appointed commander of French forces in North America. Wintering at Montreal, Lévis managed to rally his troops and train them for a spring offensive to recapture Quebec in 1760. Marching downstream with the first breaking of the ice, Lévis met the forces of James Murray at the Battle of Sainte-Foy, where Lévis' army won a victory in one of the bloodiest battles ever fought on Canadian soil. This forced Murray to retreat behind Quebec's walls and a siege began. The lack of artillery and siege equipment precluded any assault on the fortifications of Quebec and Lévis held back, awaiting reinforcements from Europe. With the arrival of a British squadron which then destroyed his support ships on the Saint Lawrence, Lévis was obliged to retreat to Montreal, where Vaudreuil eventually surrendered New France to Amherst's army, which had advanced down the Saint Lawrence River that summer, in early September.

His various letters for this period were later collected and published by Beauchemin in 1889; letters to him for this period were published by the Abbe Casgrain, a professor at Universite Laval, in 1895; Casgrain had already published in 1891 Les français au Canada : Montcalm et Lévis.

== Retirement ==
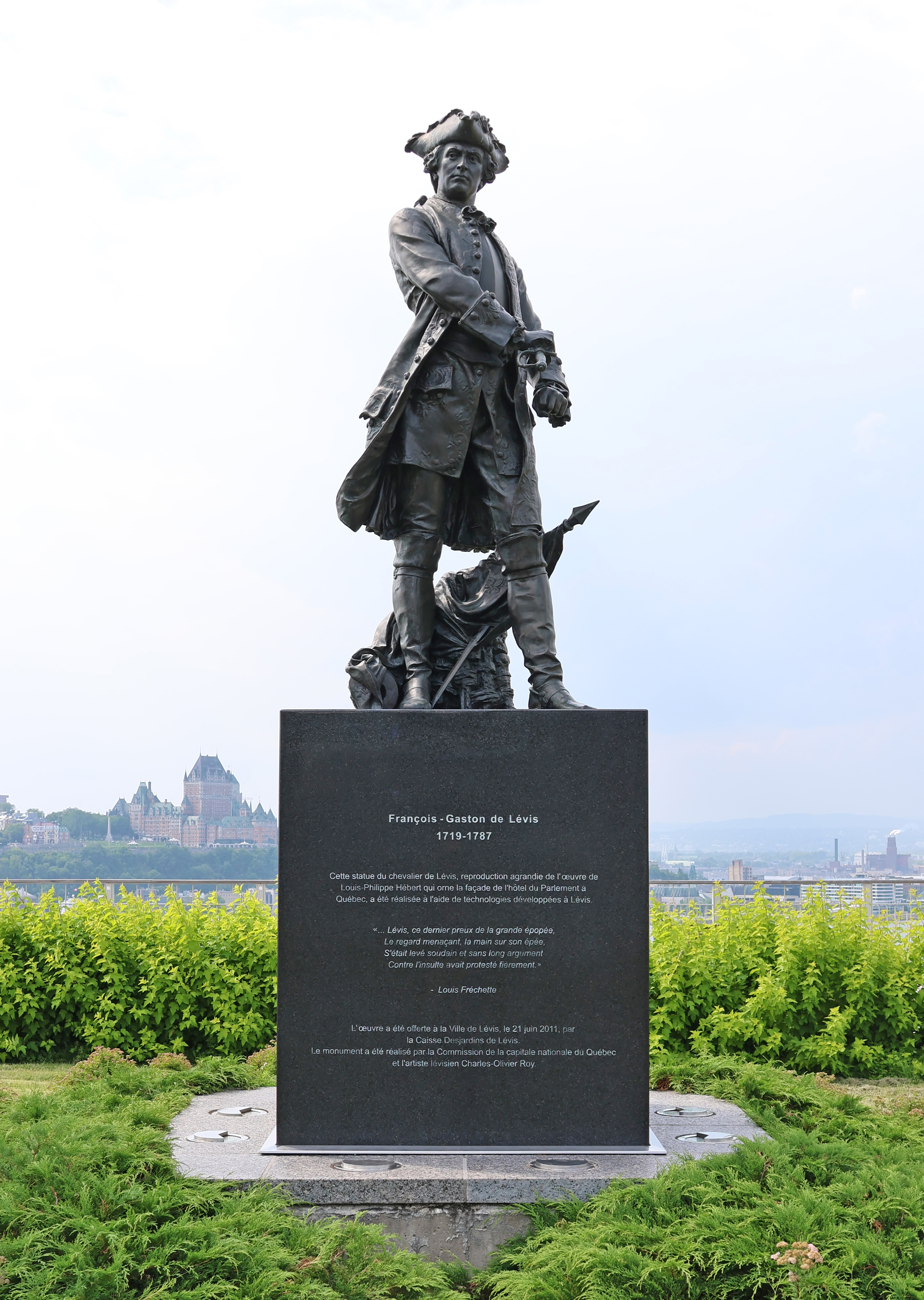
Statue of François Gaston de Lévis in Lévis

Lévis returned to France on parole, and was released for service in Europe by William Pitt. He served in the German campaigns of 1762, and retired from active military service when the war ended in 1763 with the Peace of Paris. He was appointed governor of Artois in 1765. He was promoted to Marshal of France in 1783, and was raised to the inheritable title Duc de Lévis in 1784.

He died in 1787 in Arras, France, and was succeeded as duke of Lévis by his son Pierre-Marc-Gaston, who escaped to England during the French Revolution. In 1794 his widow and two of his three daughters were sent to the guillotine during the French Revolution.

He left his name to Lévis, Quebec, across the river from Quebec City.
