= Panettiere =

Panettiere (Italian pronunciation: [panetˈtjɛːre]) is an Italian surname meaning "baker". Notable people with the surname include:

- Hayden Panettiere (1989–2026), American actress
- Jansen Panettiere (1994–2023), American actor, brother of Hayden
