= Oliver Maillard =

Breton Franciscan preacher

Oliver Maillard (b. at Juignac, (?), Brittany, about 1430; d. at Toulouse, 22 July 1502) was a Breton Franciscan preacher.

He was celebrated as forceful and popular, for his Lenten sermons in both churches and public places. His style of preaching was blunt, sometimes coarse, witty and satirical, influenced by the school of Bernardino of Siena. He criticized bankers for charging exorbitant interest, accused Louis XI of cruelty, and espoused the cause of Jeanne de Valois.

Maillard confirmed Charles VIII of France in his plan of restoring Roussillon and Cerdagne to Aragon. Pope Innocent VIII asked Maillard in 1488 to use his best endeavours with the French king for abolishing the Pragmatic Sanction.

== Life ==
He took the Franciscan habit with the Observants, apparently in the province of Aquitaine. He was there the vicar Provincial of the Observants, when on 2 June 1487, he was elected Vicar General of the Ultramontane Observants (i.e. those north of the Alps) at the general chapter of the Observants at Toulouse. After his first term of office (1487–90), he was twice re-elected (1493-6 and 1499-1502).

Retiring from office at the General Chapter of 15 May 1502, he went to Toulouse, where he died at the monastery of St. Mary of the Angela. As miracles soon were reported at his grave, the General Chapter of Barcelona in 1508 ordered that his remains should be translated to a chapel built specially for them, where for some time he enjoyed a certain amount of public veneration.

== Works ==
Of his works, nearly all of which are sermons, the most important are:

- "Sermones de adventu, quadragesimales et dominicales" (3 vols., Paris, 1497-8, 1506, 1522, etc.: Lyons, 1498, etc.);
- "Sermones de adventu, quadragesimales, dominicales" and "De peccati stipendio et gratiae praemio" (Paris, 1498-, 1515, etc.; Lyons, 1503), delivered at Paris in 1498;
- "Quadragesimale", delivered at Bruges in 1501 (Paris, s.d.); printed with the author's notes and the edition of his "Sermon fait l'an 1500 ... en la ville de Bruges" (2nd ed., Antwerp, s. d.);
- "Chanson piteuse ... chantée à Toulouse 1502" (2nd ed., Paris, 1826); "Histoire de la passion ... de nostre doulx sauveur" (Paris, 1493);
- "La conformité et correspondance tres dévote des ... mystères de la messe à la passion.", (Paris, 1552), reprinted as a literary monument (Paris, 1828);
- "L'instruction et consolacion de la vie contemplative", (Paris, s.d.), containing various treatises;
- "La confession de Frère Oliver Maillard" (Paris, s.d.; Paris, 1500), frequently edited.
