= Budinger =

Budinger is a German language locational surname, which originally meant a person from Büdingen in Germany. The name may refer to:

- Chase Budinger (born 1988), American basketball player
- Hugo Budinger (1927–2017), German field hockey player
- Sol Budinger (born 1999), English cricketer
- Victoria Mae "Miss Vicki" Budinger, first wife of entertainer Tiny Tim

== Other uses ==
- 103740 Budinger, a minor planet
