= Diotimus the Stoic =

Greek philosopher

Diotimus (Greek: Διότιμος) was a Stoic philosopher, who lived c. 100 BC.

He is said to have accused Epicurus of being depraved, and to have forged fifty letters, professing to have been written by Epicurus, to prove it. According to Athenaeus, who is evidently alluding to the same story in a passage where "Diotimus" apparently should be substituted for "Theotimus", he was convicted of the forgery, at the suit of Zeno the Epicurean, and put to death. We learn from Clement of Alexandria, that he considered happiness or well-being to consist, not in any one good, but in the perfect accumulation of blessings, which looks like a departure from strict Stoicism to the more sober view of Aristotle.
