= Philippides (comic poet) =

Philippides (Ancient Greek: Φιλιππίδης) was an Athenian poet of the Greek New Comedy. He was the son of Philokles of Kephale and was active during the 111th Olympiad (c. 336-333 BCE). Aulus Gellius records that he died at an advanced old age from the joy of an unexpected victory at a dramatic competition. He was a great personal friend (philos) of King Lysimachus (i.e. "successor" of Alexander the Great ) Philippides is reported as having had great influence with Lysimachus. In 285 BC Athens passed a decree to honor Philippides for his continuous requests to Lysimachus for aid to recover Piraeus and the forts. In 286/285 BC Philippides was elected agonothetes.

== Surviving titles and fragments ==
The Suda reports that Philippides produced 45 plays. Only the titles of 16 plays (along with associated fragments) have survived.

- Adoniazousai (Women Mourning for Adonis)
- Amphiaraos (Amphiaraus)
- Ananeosis (Renewal)
- Argyrioi Aphanismos (Disappearance of the Money)
- Auloi (Flutes)
- Basanizomene (Woman Being Tortured)
- Lakiadai (Laciadae)
- Mastropos (The Pimp)
- Olynthia (Woman from Olynthos)
- Sympleousai (Woman Sailing Together) or Synekpleousai (Women Sailing Forth Together)
- Philadelphoi (The Brother-Loving Men)
- Philathenaios (Lover of Athens)
- Philargyros (Lover of Money)
- Philarkhos (Philarchus)
- Phileuripides (The Euripides-Lover)
- Triodoi, or Rhopopoles
