= Boulenger =

Boulenger is a surname. Notable people with the surname include:

- Benjamin Boulenger (born 1990), French footballer
- Edward George Boulenger (1888–1946), British zoologist, director of aquarium at London Zoo
- George Albert Boulenger (1858–1937), Belgian-British zoologist and botanist, described over 2,000 species
- Hippolyte Boulenger (1837–1874), Belgian landscape painter
- Marcel Boulenger (1873–1932), French fencer

== See also ==
- Boulanger
